= Indian cricket team in Zimbabwe in 2016 =

International cricket tour

	Zimbabwe	India
- Dates: 11 June – 22 June 2016
Captains	Graeme Cremer	MS Dhoni

One Day International series
- Results: India won the 3-match series 3–0
Most runs	Vusi Sibanda (96)	KL Rahul (196)
Most wickets	Sikandar Raza (1); Tendai Chatara (1); Chamu Chibhabha (1)	Jasprit Bumrah (9)
- Player of the series: KL Rahul (Ind)

Twenty20 International series
- Results: India won the 3-match series 2–1
Most runs	Elton Chigumbura (78)	Mandeep Singh (87)
Most wickets	Donald Tiripano (3)	Barinder Sran (6)
- Player of the series: Barinder Sran (Ind)

The Indian cricket team toured Zimbabwe from 11 June to 22 June 2016, playing three One Day Internationals (ODIs) and three Twenty20 Internationals (T20Is). Two weeks prior to the series, Zimbabwe Cricket sacked Hamilton Masakadza as captain and replaced him with Graeme Cremer.

Makhaya Ntini, interim coach of the Zimbabwe side, was critical of India's inexperienced squad selected for the series saying "if you send us a team that is not your strongest team, we're going to put them under the carpet". India went on to win the ODI series 3–0, losing the fewest wickets for a team during a three-match series. India also won the T20I series 2–1.

== Squads ==
ODIs		T20Is	
Zimbabwe	India	Zimbabwe	India
Graeme Cremer (c); Richmond Mutumbami (wk); Tendai Chatara; Chamu Chibhabha; Elton Chigumbura; Tendai Chisoro; Craig Ervine; Neville Madziva; Malcolm Waller; Timycen Maruma; Hamilton Masakadza; Wellington Masakadza; Peter Moor; Tawanda Mupariwa; Taurai Muzarabani; Sikandar Raza; Vusi Sibanda; Donald Tiripano; Sean Williams	MS Dhoni (c, wk); Jasprit Bumrah; Yuzvendra Chahal; Rishi Dhawan; Faiz Fazal; Kedar Jadhav; Dhawal Kulkarni; Karun Nair; Manish Pandey; Axar Patel; KL Rahul; Ambati Rayudu; Mandeep Singh; Barinder Sran; Jaydev Unadkat; Jayant Yadav	Graeme Cremer (c); Richmond Mutumbami (wk); Sikandar Raza; Brian Chari; Tendai Chatara; Chamu Chibhabha; Elton Chigumbura; Neville Madziva; Timycen Maruma; Hamilton Masakadza; Wellington Masakadza; Peter Moor; Tapiwa Mufudza; Tinotenda Mutombodzi; Taurai Muzarabani; Vusi Sibanda; Donald Tiripano; Malcolm Waller	MS Dhoni (c, wk); Jasprit Bumrah; Yuzvendra Chahal; Rishi Dhawan; Faiz Fazal; Kedar Jadhav; Dhawal Kulkarni; Karun Nair; Manish Pandey; Axar Patel; KL Rahul; Ambati Rayudu; Mandeep Singh; Barinder Sran; Jaydev Unadkat; Jayant Yadav

== ODI series ==
=== 1st ODI ===
11 June 2016
09:00
Scorecard

Zimbabwe; 168 (49.5 overs)	v	India; 173/1 (42.3 overs)
Elton Chigumbura 41 (65); Jasprit Bumrah 4/28 (9.5 overs)		KL Rahul 100* (115); Tendai Chatara 1/20 (7 overs)

India won by 9 wickets
Harare Sports Club, Harare
Umpires: Ian Gould (Eng) and Russell Tiffin (Zim)
Player of the match: KL Rahul (Ind)

- India won the toss and elected to field.
- Yuzvendra Chahal, Karun Nair and KL Rahul (Ind) all made their ODI debuts.
- KL Rahul became the 11th player to score a century on debut in an ODI and the first for India.
- Elton Chigumbura (Zim) played in his 200th ODI, of which 197 have been for Zimbabwe and three for Africa XI.

=== 2nd ODI ===
13 June 2016
Scorecard

Zimbabwe; 126 (34.3 overs)	v	India; 129/2 (26.5 overs)
Vusi Sibanda 53 (69); Yuzvendra Chahal 3/25 (6 overs)		Ambati Rayudu 41 (44); Sikandar Raza 1/7 (1.5 overs)

India won by 8 wickets
Harare Sports Club, Harare
Umpires: Ian Gould (Eng) and Langton Rusere (Zim)
Player of the match: Yuzvendra Chahal (Ind)

- India won the toss and elected to field.

=== 3rd ODI ===
15 June 2016
Scorecard

Zimbabwe; 123 (42.2 overs)	v	India; 126/0 (21.5 overs)
Vusi Sibanda 38 (71); Jasprit Bumrah 4/22 (10 overs)		KL Rahul 63* (70)

India won by 10 wickets
Harare Sports Club, Harare
Umpires: Ian Gould (Eng) and Jeremiah Matibiri (Zim)
Player of the match: KL Rahul (Ind)

- Zimbabwe won the toss and elected to bat.
- Faiz Fazal (Ind) made his ODI debut.
- MS Dhoni (Ind) took his 350th dismissal in an ODI.

== T20I series ==
=== 1st T20I ===
18 June 2016
Scorecard

Zimbabwe; 170/6 (20 overs)	v	India; 168/6 (20 overs)
Elton Chigumbura 55* (26); Jasprit Bumrah 2/25 (4 overs)		Manish Pandey 48 (35); Chamu Chibhabha 2/13 (2 overs)

Zimbabwe won by 2 runs
Harare Sports Club, Harare
Umpires: Jeremiah Matibiri (Zim) and Russell Tiffin (Zim)
Player of the match: Elton Chigumbura (Zim)

- India won the toss and elected to field.
- Yuzvendra Chahal, Rishi Dhawan, KL Rahul, Mandeep Singh and Jaydev Unadkat (Ind) all made their T20I debuts.
- Zimbabwe's total of 170 is their highest in T20Is against India.
- KL Rahul became the first player for India to be dismissed off the first ball of their innings in a T20I match.

=== 2nd T20I ===
20 June 2016
Scorecard

Zimbabwe; 99/9 (20 overs)	v	India; 103/0 (13.1 overs)
Peter Moor 31 (32); Barinder Sran 4/10 (4 overs)		Mandeep Singh 52* (40)

India won by 10 wickets
Harare Sports Club, Harare
Umpires: Langton Rusere (Zim) and Russell Tiffin (Zim)
Player of the match: Barinder Sran (Ind)

- Zimbabwe won the toss and elected to bat.
- Dhawal Kulkarni and Barinder Sran (Ind) both made their T20I debuts.
- This was India's first 10-wicket win in a T20I.
- Barinder Sran (Ind) took the second-best figures for a bowler on debut in a T20I.

=== 3rd T20I ===
22 June 2016
Scorecard

India; 138/6 (20 overs)	v	Zimbabwe; 135/6 (20 overs)
Kedar Jadhav 58 (42); Donald Tiripano 3/20 (4 overs)		Vusi Sibanda 28 (23); Dhawal Kulkarni 2/23 (4 overs)

India won by 3 runs
Harare Sports Club, Harare
Umpires: Jeremiah Matibiri (Zim) and Russell Tiffin (Zim)
Player of the match: Kedar Jadhav (Ind)

- Zimbabwe won the toss and elected to field.
- MS Dhoni (Ind) stood in his 324th international match as captain, equaling the record held by Ricky Ponting (Aus).
- Hamilton Masakadza became the first player for Zimbabwe to play in 50 T20I matches.
