= List of India national cricket captains =

Test Captain of India national cricket team (Men's & Women's)
- Deputy: TBA

Captain of India national cricket team
- Official Flag of India

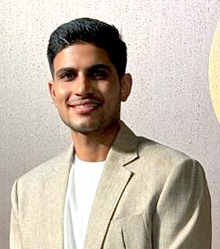
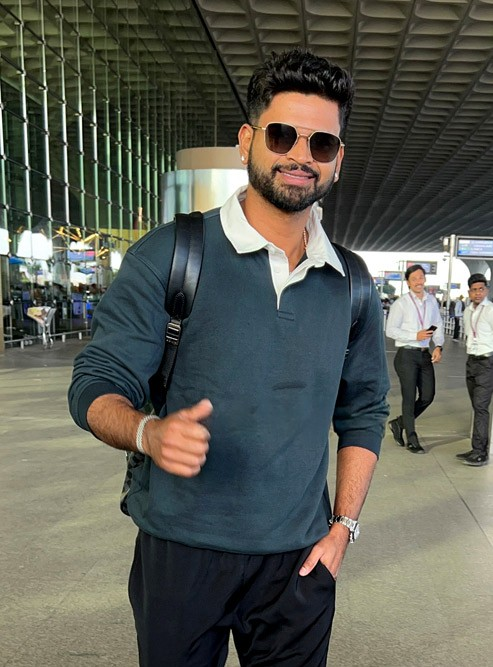
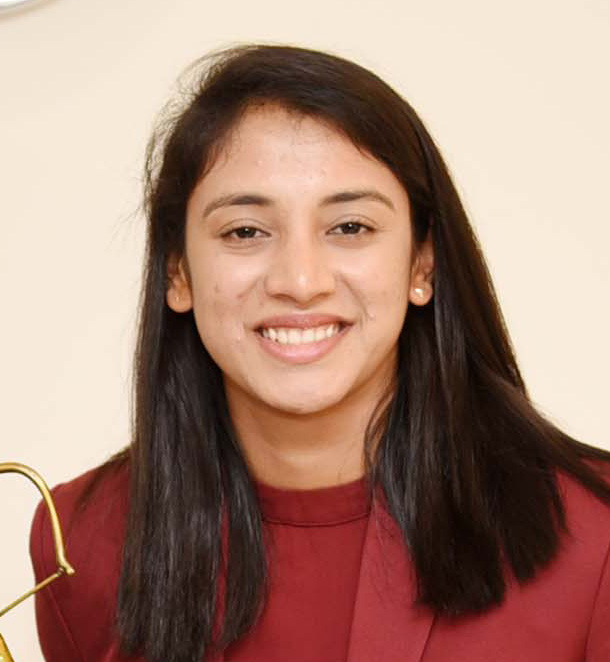
- Shubman Gill Shreyas Iyer Smriti Mandhana Incumbent; Top: Shubman Gill (Men's team : Test and ODI); Middle: Shreyas Iyer (Men's Team: T20I); Bottom: Smriti Mandhana (Women's team - All formats) since men's Team Test : 2025, ODI: 2025; T20I : 2023 women's Team All Formats; 2019 Respectively
- Board of Control for Cricket in India
- Type: Captain
- Status: Captain of the India National Cricket Team
- Member of: India national cricket team (Men's); India women's national cricket team
- Reports to: Board of Control for Cricket in India
- Appointer: Board of Control for Cricket in India
- Term length: Not Specified
- Inaugural holder: Men's National Captains: C. K. Nayudu (Test); Ajit Wadekar (ODI); Virender Sehwag (T20I); Women's National Captains: Shantha Rangaswamy (Test); Diana Edulji (ODI); Mithali Raj (T20I)
- Formation: June 1932 (94 years ago)
- Deputy: Vice Captain of Indian Cricket Team

This is the list of captains of Indian cricket team who have led the team in at least one international cricket match. A captain is the appointed leader of the team, having several additional roles and responsibilities over and above those of the other players. As in other sports, the captain is usually experienced and has good communication skills and is likely to be one of the most regular members of the team, as the captain is responsible for the team selection. Before the starting of the game in cricket, the captains toss which decides which team will bat first. During the match the captain decides the team's batting order, who will bowl each over, and where each fielder will be positioned.

Cricket was introduced to the Indian subcontinent by the English in the 17th and 18th centuries. Board of Control for Cricket in India (BCCI) is the national governing body of cricket in India. The BCCI was established on 1 December 1928 at Madras and joined the Imperial Cricket Conference in 1926 which later became the International Cricket Council. The captains of the national teams are appointed by BCCI and the India national cricket team selectors appointed by BCCI choose the other players for the national teams.

On 25 June 1932, India became the sixth nation to play test cricket and the men's cricket team was led by C. K. Nayudu against England at Lord's. Nayudu led India in the first international cricket match held in India on 15 December 1933 when Gymkhana Ground in Bombay hosted the only match during England's tour of India. Vijay Hazare led India to its first win in fifth test of home series against England on 10 February 1952 at M. A. Chidambaram Stadium in Madras. Ajit Wadekar led India in its first ever ODI on 13 July 1974 at Leeds against England. On 1 December 2006, Virender Sehwag captained India in its first T20 International against South Africa at Johannesberg.

Shantha Rangaswamy led the women's team in their first women's test match against West Indies at M. Chinnaswamy Stadium at Bangalore on 31 October 1976. Diana Edulji led India in its first WODI during the 1978 Women's Cricket World Cup against England on 1 January 1978 at Eden Gardens in Calcutta. Mithali Raj captained India in the first WT20I on 5 August 2006 against England at Derby.

Krishnamachari Srikkanth was the captain for the first youth test for India U-19 team against Pakistan U-19 which began on 20 January 1979 at Wankhede Stadium in Bombay while Ravi Shastri captained India U-19 in the first youth ODI in 1981 against England U-19.

Shubman Gill is the current captain of the men's team in Test & ODI, Shreyas Iyer is the captain of the men's team in T20Is, and Smriti Mandhana is current captain of women's team in all Formats.

== Men's ==
=== Test ===
This is a list of cricketers who have captained the Indian men's cricket team for at least one Test match. A dagger (†) indicates that the player captained at least one Test in the series as a stand-in for the appointed captain or was appointed by the home authority for a proportion in a series.

38 players have captained India in men's test matches, of which Virat Kohli is the most successful with 40 wins.

Indian Test match captains
Number	Image	Name	Season	Opposition	Location	Played	Won	Lost	Drawn/Tied	Win %
1		C. K. Nayudu	1932	England	England	1	0	1	0	
1		C. K. Nayudu	1933–34	England	India	3	0	2	1	
1		C. K. Nayudu	Total			4	0	3	1	0.00
2		Maharajkumar of Vizianagram	1936	England	England	3	0	2	1	
2		Maharajkumar of Vizianagram	Total			3	0	2	1	0.00
3		Iftikhar Ali Khan Pataudi	1946	England	England	3	0	1	2	
3		Iftikhar Ali Khan Pataudi	Total			3	0	1	2	0.00
4	Lala Amarnath at Lord's 1936	Lala Amarnath	1947–48	Australia	Australia	5	0	4	1	
4	Lala Amarnath at Lord's 1936	Lala Amarnath	1948–49	West Indies	India	5	0	1	4	
4	Lala Amarnath at Lord's 1936	Lala Amarnath	1952–53	Pakistan	India	5	3	1	2	
4	Lala Amarnath at Lord's 1936	Lala Amarnath	Total			15	3	6	7	20
5		Vijay Hazare	1951–52	England	India	5	1	1	3	
5		Vijay Hazare	1952	England	England	4	0	3	1	
5		Vijay Hazare	1952–53	West Indies	West Indies	5	0	1	4	
5		Vijay Hazare	Total			14	1	5	8	7.14
6		Vinoo Mankad	1954–55	Pakistan	Pakistan	5	0	0	5	
6		Vinoo Mankad	1958–59†	West Indies	India	1	0	1	0	
6		Vinoo Mankad	Total			6	0	1	5	0.00
7		Ghulam Ahmed	1955–56†	New Zealand	India	1	0	0	1	
7		Ghulam Ahmed	1958–59	West Indies	India	2	0	2	0	
7		Ghulam Ahmed	Total			3	0	2	1	0.00
8		Polly Umrigar	1955–56	New Zealand	India	4	2	0	2	
8		Polly Umrigar	1956–57	Australia	India	3	0	2	1	
8		Polly Umrigar	1958–59†	West Indies	India	1	0	0	1	
8		Polly Umrigar	Total			8	2	2	4	25.00
9		Hemu Adhikari	1958–59†	West Indies	India	1	0	0	1	
9		Hemu Adhikari	Total			1	0	0	1	0.00
10		Datta Gaekwad	1959	England	England	4	0	4	0	
10		Datta Gaekwad	Total			4	0	4	0	0.00
11		Pankaj Roy	1959†	England	England	1	0	1	0	
11		Pankaj Roy	Total			1	0	1	0	0.00
12		Gulabrai Ramchand	1959–60	Australia	India	5	1	2	2	
12		Gulabrai Ramchand	Total			5	1	2	2	20.00
13		Nari Contractor	1960–61	Pakistan	India	5	0	0	5	
13		Nari Contractor	1961–62	England	India	5	2	0	3	
13		Nari Contractor	1961–62†	West Indies	West Indies	2	0	2	0	
13		Nari Contractor	Total			12	2	2	8	16.67
14		Mansoor Ali Khan Pataudi	1961–62	West Indies	West Indies	3	0	3	0	
14		Mansoor Ali Khan Pataudi	1963–64	England	India	5	0	0	5	
14		Mansoor Ali Khan Pataudi	1964–65	Australia	India	3	1	1	1	
14		Mansoor Ali Khan Pataudi	1964–65	New Zealand	India	4	1	0	3	
14		Mansoor Ali Khan Pataudi	1966–67	West Indies	India	3	0	2	1	
14		Mansoor Ali Khan Pataudi	1967	England	England	3	0	3	0	
14		Mansoor Ali Khan Pataudi	1967–68	Australia	Australia	3	0	3	0	
14		Mansoor Ali Khan Pataudi	1967–68	New Zealand	New Zealand	4	3	1	0	
14		Mansoor Ali Khan Pataudi	1969–70	New Zealand	India	3	1	1	1	
14		Mansoor Ali Khan Pataudi	1969–70	Australia	India	5	1	3	1	
14		Mansoor Ali Khan Pataudi	1974–75	West Indies	India	4	2	2	0	
14		Mansoor Ali Khan Pataudi	Total			40	9	19	12	22.50
15		Chandu Borde	1967–68†	Australia	Australia	1	0	1	0	
15		Chandu Borde	Total			1	0	1	0	0.00
16		Ajit Wadekar	1970–71	West Indies	West Indies	5	1	0	4	
16		Ajit Wadekar	1971	England	England	3	1	0	2	
16		Ajit Wadekar	1972–73	England	India	5	2	1	2	
16		Ajit Wadekar	1974	England	England	3	0	3	0	
16		Ajit Wadekar	Total			16	4	4	8	25.00
17		Srinivasaraghavan Venkataraghavan	1974–75†	West Indies	India	1	0	1	0	
17		Srinivasaraghavan Venkataraghavan	1979	England	England	4	0	1	3	
17		Srinivasaraghavan Venkataraghavan	Total			5	0	2	3	0.00
18	Sunny Gavaskar Sahara	Sunil Gavaskar	1975–76†	New Zealand	New Zealand	1	1	0	0	
18	Sunny Gavaskar Sahara	Sunil Gavaskar	1978–79	West Indies	India	6	1	0	5	
18	Sunny Gavaskar Sahara	Sunil Gavaskar	1979–80	Australia	India	6	2	0	4	
18	Sunny Gavaskar Sahara	Sunil Gavaskar	1979–80	Pakistan	India	5	2	0	3	
18	Sunny Gavaskar Sahara	Sunil Gavaskar	1980–81	Australia	Australia	3	1	1	1	
18	Sunny Gavaskar Sahara	Sunil Gavaskar	1980–81	New Zealand	New Zealand	3	0	1	2	
18	Sunny Gavaskar Sahara	Sunil Gavaskar	1981–82	England	India	6	1	0	5	
18	Sunny Gavaskar Sahara	Sunil Gavaskar	1982	England	England	3	0	1	2	
18	Sunny Gavaskar Sahara	Sunil Gavaskar	1982–83	Sri Lanka	India	1	0	0	1	
18	Sunny Gavaskar Sahara	Sunil Gavaskar	1982–83	Pakistan	Pakistan	6	0	3	3	
18	Sunny Gavaskar Sahara	Sunil Gavaskar	1984–85	Pakistan	Pakistan	2	0	0	2	
18	Sunny Gavaskar Sahara	Sunil Gavaskar	1984–85	England	India	5	1	2	2	
18	Sunny Gavaskar Sahara	Sunil Gavaskar	Total			47	9	8	30	19.14
19		Bishan Singh Bedi	1975–76	New Zealand	New Zealand	2	0	1	1	
19		Bishan Singh Bedi	1975–76	West Indies	West Indies	4	1	2	1	
19		Bishan Singh Bedi	1976–77	New Zealand	India	3	2	0	1	
19		Bishan Singh Bedi	1976–77	England	India	5	1	3	1	
19		Bishan Singh Bedi	1977–78	Australia	Australia	5	2	3	0	
19		Bishan Singh Bedi	1978–79	Pakistan	Pakistan	3	0	2	1	
19		Bishan Singh Bedi	Total			22	6	11	5	27.27
20		Gundappa Viswanath	1979–80†	Pakistan	India	1	0	0	1	
20		Gundappa Viswanath	1979–80	England	India	1	0	1	0	
20		Gundappa Viswanath	Total			2	0	1	1	0.00
21	Kapil dev cropped	Kapil Dev	1982–83	West Indies	West Indies	5	0	2	3	
21	Kapil dev cropped	Kapil Dev	1983–84	Pakistan	India	3	0	0	3	
21	Kapil dev cropped	Kapil Dev	1983–84	West Indies	India	6	0	3	3	
21	Kapil dev cropped	Kapil Dev	1985	Sri Lanka	Sri Lanka	3	0	1	2	
21	Kapil dev cropped	Kapil Dev	1985–86	Australia	Australia	3	0	0	3	
21	Kapil dev cropped	Kapil Dev	1986	England	England	3	2	0	1	
21	Kapil dev cropped	Kapil Dev	1986–87	Australia	India	3	0	0	2	
21	Kapil dev cropped	Kapil Dev	1986–87	Sri Lanka	India	3	2	0	1	
21	Kapil dev cropped	Kapil Dev	1986–87	Pakistan	India	5	0	1	4	
21	Kapil dev cropped	Kapil Dev	Total			34	4	7	23	11.76
22		Dilip Vengsarkar	1987–88	West Indies	India	3	0	1	2	
22		Dilip Vengsarkar	1988–89	New Zealand	India	3	2	1	0	
22		Dilip Vengsarkar	1988–89	West Indies	West Indies	4	0	3	1	
22		Dilip Vengsarkar	Total			10	2	5	3	20.00
23		Ravi Shastri	1987–88†	West Indies	India	1	1	0	0	
23		Ravi Shastri	Total			1	1	0	0	100.00
24		Krishnamachari Srikkanth	1989–90	Pakistan	Pakistan	4	0	0	4	
24		Krishnamachari Srikkanth	Total			4	0	0	4	0.00
25		Mohammad Azharuddin	1989–90	New Zealand	New Zealand	3	0	1	2	
25		Mohammad Azharuddin	1990	England	England	3	0	1	2	
25		Mohammad Azharuddin	1990–91	Sri Lanka	India	1	1	0	0	
25		Mohammad Azharuddin	1991–92	Australia	Australia	5	0	4	1	
25		Mohammad Azharuddin	1992–93	Zimbabwe	Zimbabwe	1	0	0	1	
25		Mohammad Azharuddin	1992–93	South Africa	South Africa	4	0	1	3	
25		Mohammad Azharuddin	1992–93	England	India	3	3	0	0	
25		Mohammad Azharuddin	1992–93	Zimbabwe	India	1	1	0	0	
25		Mohammad Azharuddin	1993	Sri Lanka	Sri Lanka	3	1	0	2	
25		Mohammad Azharuddin	1993–94	Sri Lanka	India	3	3	0	0	
25		Mohammad Azharuddin	1993–94	New Zealand	New Zealand	1	0	0	1	
25		Mohammad Azharuddin	1994–95	West Indies	India	3	1	1	1	
25		Mohammad Azharuddin	1995–96	New Zealand	India	3	1	0	2	
25		Mohammad Azharuddin	1996	England	England	3	0	1	2	
25		Mohammad Azharuddin	1997–98	Australia	India	3	2	1	0	
25		Mohammad Azharuddin	1998–99	Zimbabwe	Zimbabwe	1	0	1	0	
25		Mohammad Azharuddin	1998–99	New Zealand	New Zealand	2	0	1	1	
25		Mohammad Azharuddin	1998–99	Pakistan	India	2	1	1	0	
25		Mohammad Azharuddin	1998–99	Pakistan	India	1	0	1	0	
25		Mohammad Azharuddin	1998–99	Sri Lanka	Sri Lanka	1	0	0	1	
25		Mohammad Azharuddin	Total			47	14	14	19	29.79
26	Sachin Tendulkar	Sachin Tendulkar	1996–97	Australia	India	1	1	0	0	
26	Sachin Tendulkar	Sachin Tendulkar	1996–97	South Africa	India	3	2	1	0	
26	Sachin Tendulkar	Sachin Tendulkar	1996–97	South Africa	South Africa	3	0	2	1	
26	Sachin Tendulkar	Sachin Tendulkar	1996–97	West Indies	West Indies	5	0	1	4	
26	Sachin Tendulkar	Sachin Tendulkar	1997	Sri Lanka	Sri Lanka	2	0	0	2	
26	Sachin Tendulkar	Sachin Tendulkar	1997–98	Sri Lanka	India	3	0	0	3	
26	Sachin Tendulkar	Sachin Tendulkar	1999–2000	New Zealand	India	3	1	0	2	
26	Sachin Tendulkar	Sachin Tendulkar	1999–2000	Australia	Australia	3	0	3	0	
26	Sachin Tendulkar	Sachin Tendulkar	1999–2000	South Africa	India	2	0	2	0	
26	Sachin Tendulkar	Sachin Tendulkar	Total			25	4	9	12	16.00
27	Sourav Ganguly crop	Sourav Ganguly	2000–01	Bangladesh	Bangladesh	1	1	0	0	
27	Sourav Ganguly crop	Sourav Ganguly	2000–01	Zimbabwe	India	2	1	0	1	
27	Sourav Ganguly crop	Sourav Ganguly	2000–01	Australia	India	3	2	1	0	
27	Sourav Ganguly crop	Sourav Ganguly	2001	Zimbabwe	Zimbabwe	2	1	1	0	
27	Sourav Ganguly crop	Sourav Ganguly	2001	Sri Lanka	Sri Lanka	3	1	2	0	
27	Sourav Ganguly crop	Sourav Ganguly	2001–02	South Africa	South Africa	2	0	1	1	
27	Sourav Ganguly crop	Sourav Ganguly	2001–02	England	India	3	1	0	2	
27	Sourav Ganguly crop	Sourav Ganguly	2001–02	Zimbabwe	India	2	2	0	0	
27	Sourav Ganguly crop	Sourav Ganguly	2001–02	West Indies	West Indies	5	1	2	2	
27	Sourav Ganguly crop	Sourav Ganguly	2002	England	England	4	1	1	2	
27	Sourav Ganguly crop	Sourav Ganguly	2002–03	West Indies	India	3	2	0	1	
27	Sourav Ganguly crop	Sourav Ganguly	2002–03	New Zealand	New Zealand	2	0	2	0	
27	Sourav Ganguly crop	Sourav Ganguly	2003–04	New Zealand	India	1	0	0	1	
27	Sourav Ganguly crop	Sourav Ganguly	2003–04	Australia	Australia	4	1	1	2	
27	Sourav Ganguly crop	Sourav Ganguly	2003–04	Pakistan	Pakistan	1	1	0	0	
27	Sourav Ganguly crop	Sourav Ganguly	2004–05	Australia	India	2	0	1	1	
27	Sourav Ganguly crop	Sourav Ganguly	2004–05	South Africa	India	2	1	0	1	
27	Sourav Ganguly crop	Sourav Ganguly	2004–05	Bangladesh	Bangladesh	2	2	0	0	
27	Sourav Ganguly crop	Sourav Ganguly	2004–05	Pakistan	India	3	1	1	1	
27	Sourav Ganguly crop	Sourav Ganguly	2005–06	Zimbabwe	Zimbabwe	2	2	0	0	
27	Sourav Ganguly crop	Sourav Ganguly	Total			49	21	13	15	42.86
28	Rahul Dravid	Rahul Dravid	2003†	New Zealand	India	1	0	0	1	
28	Rahul Dravid	Rahul Dravid	2004†	Pakistan	Pakistan	2	1	1	0	
28	Rahul Dravid	Rahul Dravid	2004†	Australia	India	2	1	1	0	
28	Rahul Dravid	Rahul Dravid	2005–06	Sri Lanka	India	2	1	0	1	
28	Rahul Dravid	Rahul Dravid	2006	Pakistan	Pakistan	3	0	1	2	
28	Rahul Dravid	Rahul Dravid	2006	England	India	3	1	1	1	
28	Rahul Dravid	Rahul Dravid	2006	West Indies	West Indies	4	1	0	3	
28	Rahul Dravid	Rahul Dravid	2006–07	South Africa	South Africa	3	1	2	0	
28	Rahul Dravid	Rahul Dravid	2007	Bangladesh	Bangladesh	2	1	0	1	
28	Rahul Dravid	Rahul Dravid	2007	England	England	3	1	0	2	
28	Rahul Dravid	Rahul Dravid	Total			25	8	6	11	32.00
29	Virender Sehwag	Virender Sehwag	2005–06†	Sri Lanka	India	1	1	0	0	
29	Virender Sehwag	Virender Sehwag	2009†	New Zealand	New Zealand	1	0	0	1	
29	Virender Sehwag	Virender Sehwag	2010†	Bangladesh	Bangladesh	1	1	0	0	
29	Virender Sehwag	Virender Sehwag	2011–12†	Australia	Australia	1	0	1	0	
29	Virender Sehwag	Virender Sehwag	Total			4	2	1	1	50.00
30	Anil Kumble	Anil Kumble	2007	Pakistan	India	3	1	0	2	
30	Anil Kumble	Anil Kumble	2007–08	Australia	Australia	4	1	2	1	
30	Anil Kumble	Anil Kumble	2008	South Africa	India	2	0	1	1	
30	Anil Kumble	Anil Kumble	2008	Sri Lanka	Sri Lanka	3	1	2	0	
30	Anil Kumble	Anil Kumble	2008	Australia	India	2	0	0	2	
30	Anil Kumble	Anil Kumble	Total			14	3	5	6	21.42
31		Mahendra Singh Dhoni	2008†	South Africa	India	1	1	0	0	
31		Mahendra Singh Dhoni	2008†	Australia	India	2	2	0	0	
31		Mahendra Singh Dhoni	2008	England	India	2	1	0	1	
31		Mahendra Singh Dhoni	2009	New Zealand	New Zealand	2	1	0	1	
31		Mahendra Singh Dhoni	2009	Sri Lanka	India	3	2	0	1	
31		Mahendra Singh Dhoni	2010	Bangladesh	Bangladesh	1	1	0	0	
31		Mahendra Singh Dhoni	2010	South Africa	India	2	1	1	0	
31		Mahendra Singh Dhoni	2010	Sri Lanka	Sri Lanka	3	1	1	1	
31		Mahendra Singh Dhoni	2010	Australia	India	2	2	0	0	
31		Mahendra Singh Dhoni	2010	New Zealand	India	3	1	0	2	
31		Mahendra Singh Dhoni	2010-11	South Africa	South Africa	3	1	1	1	
31		Mahendra Singh Dhoni	2011	West Indies	West Indies	3	1	0	2	
31		Mahendra Singh Dhoni	2011	England	England	4	0	4	0	
31		Mahendra Singh Dhoni	2011	West Indies	India	3	2	0	1	
31		Mahendra Singh Dhoni	2011–12	Australia	Australia	3	0	3	0	
31		Mahendra Singh Dhoni	2012	New Zealand	India	2	2	0	0	
31		Mahendra Singh Dhoni	2012	England	India	4	1	2	1	
31		Mahendra Singh Dhoni	2013	Australia	India	4	4	0	0	
31		Mahendra Singh Dhoni	2013	West Indies	India	2	2	0	0	
31		Mahendra Singh Dhoni	2013-14	South Africa	South Africa	2	0	1	1	
31		Mahendra Singh Dhoni	2014	New Zealand	New Zealand	2	0	1	1	
31		Mahendra Singh Dhoni	2014	England	England	5	1	3	1	
31		Mahendra Singh Dhoni	2014-15	Australia	Australia	2	0	1	1	
31		Mahendra Singh Dhoni	Total			60	27	18	15	45.00
32		Virat Kohli	2014–15†	Australia	Australia	2	0	1	1	
32		Virat Kohli	2015	Bangladesh	Bangladesh	1	0	0	1	
32		Virat Kohli	2015	Sri Lanka	Sri Lanka	3	2	1	0	
32		Virat Kohli	2015	South Africa	India	4	3	0	1	
32		Virat Kohli	2016	West Indies	West Indies	4	2	0	2	
32		Virat Kohli	2016	New Zealand	India	3	3	0	0	
32		Virat Kohli	2016	England	India	5	4	0	1	
32		Virat Kohli	2017	Bangladesh	India	1	1	0	0	
32		Virat Kohli	2017	Australia	India	3	1	1	1	
32		Virat Kohli	2017	Sri Lanka	Sri Lanka	3	3	0	0	
32		Virat Kohli	2017	Sri Lanka	India	3	1	0	2	
32		Virat Kohli	2018	South Africa	South Africa	3	1	2	0	
32		Virat Kohli	2018	England	England	5	1	4	0	
32		Virat Kohli	2018	West Indies	India	2	2	0	0	
32		Virat Kohli	2018–19	Australia	Australia	4	2	1	1	
32		Virat Kohli	2019	West Indies	West Indies	2	2	0	0	
32		Virat Kohli	2019	South Africa	India	3	3	0	0	
32		Virat Kohli	2019	Bangladesh	India	2	2	0	0	
32		Virat Kohli	2020	New Zealand	New Zealand	2	0	2	0	
32		Virat Kohli	2020–21	Australia	Australia	1	0	1	0	
32		Virat Kohli	2021	England	India	4	3	1	0	
32		Virat Kohli	2021	New Zealand	England	1	0	1	0	
32		Virat Kohli	2021	England	England	4	2	1	1	
32		Virat Kohli	2021	New Zealand	India	1	1	0	0	
32		Virat Kohli	2021–22	South Africa	South Africa	2	1	1	0	
32		Virat Kohli	Total			68	40	17	11	58.82
33		Ajinkya Rahane	2017†	Australia	India	1	1	0	0	
33		Ajinkya Rahane	2018	Afghanistan	India	1	1	0	0	
33		Ajinkya Rahane	2020–21†	Australia	Australia	3	2	0	1	
33		Ajinkya Rahane	2021†	New Zealand	India	1	0	0	1	
33		Ajinkya Rahane	Total			6	4	0	2	66.67
34		KL Rahul	2022†	South Africa	South Africa	1	0	1	0	
34		KL Rahul	2022	Bangladesh	Bangladesh	2	2	0	0	
34		KL Rahul	Total			3	2	1	0	66.67
35		Rohit Sharma	2022	Sri Lanka	India	2	2	0	0	
35		Rohit Sharma	2023	Australia	India	4	2	1	1	
35		Rohit Sharma	2023	Australia	England	1	0	1	0	
35		Rohit Sharma	2023	West Indies	West Indies	2	1	0	1	
35		Rohit Sharma	2023-24	South Africa	South Africa	2	1	1	0	
35		Rohit Sharma	2024	England	India	5	4	1	0	
35		Rohit Sharma	2024	Bangladesh	India	2	2	0	0	
35		Rohit Sharma	2024	New Zealand	India	3	0	3	0	
35		Rohit Sharma	2024-25	Australia	Australia	3	0	2	1	
35		Rohit Sharma	Total			24	12	9	3	50.00
36		Jasprit Bumrah	2022†	England	England	1	0	1	0	
36		Jasprit Bumrah	2024-25†	Australia	Australia	2	1	1	0	
36		Jasprit Bumrah	Total			3	1	2	0	33.33
37		Shubman Gill	2025	England	England	5	2	2	1	
37		Shubman Gill	2025	West Indies	India	2	2	0	0	
37		Shubman Gill	2025	South Africa	India	1	0	1	0	
37		Shubman Gill	2026	Afghanistan	India	1	1	0	0	
37		Shubman Gill	2026	Sri Lanka	Sri Lanka	2	1	0	1	
37		Shubman Gill	Total			11	6	3	2	54.55
38		Rishabh Pant	2025†	South Africa	India	1	0	1	0	
38		Rishabh Pant	Total			1	0	1	0	0.00
Total						599	186	188	225	31.05

Last updated: 8 June 2026

=== ODI ===
This is a list of cricketers who have captained the Indian men's cricket team for at least one ODI. 27 players have captained the Indian men's team in ODIs of which MS Dhoni is the most successful captain of men's cricket team with 110 wins. Kapil Dev captained India to win in the 1983 Cricket World Cup, the first ever ICC trophy and later, India won the 2011 Cricket World Cup under the captaincy of Dhoni.

Indian ODI Captains
Number	Image	Name	Span	Matches	Won	Lost	Tied	No result	Win %
1		Ajit Wadekar	1974	2	0	2	0	0	0.00
2		Srinivasaraghavan Venkataraghavan	1975–79	7	1	6	0	0	14.28
3		Bishen Singh Bedi	1975–78	4	1	3	0	0	25.00
4		Sunil Gavaskar	1980–85	37	14	21	0	2	37.83
5		Gundappa Viswanath	1980	1	0	1	0	0	0.00
6		Kapil Dev	1982–92	74	39	33	0	2	52.70
7		Syed Kirmani	1983	1	0	1	0	0	0.00
8		Mohinder Amarnath	1984	1	0	0	0	1	0.00
9		Ravi Shastri	1986–91	11	4	7	0	0	36.36
10		Dilip Vengsarkar	1987–88	18	8	10	0	0	44.44
11		Krishnamachari Srikkanth	1989	13	4	8	0	1	30.76
12		Mohammad Azharuddin	1989–99	174	90	76	2	6	51.72
13		Sachin Tendulkar	1996–99	73	23	43	1	6	31.50
14		Ajay Jadeja	1998–99	13	8	5	0	0	61.53
15		Sourav Ganguly	1999–2005	146	76	65	0	5	52.05
16		Rahul Dravid	2000–07	79	42	33	0	4	53.16
17		Anil Kumble	2002	1	1	0	0	0	100.00
18		Virender Sehwag	2003–2011	12	7	5	0	0	58.33
19		Mahendra Singh Dhoni	2007–18	200	110	74	5	11	55.00
20		Suresh Raina	2010-2014	12	6	5	0	1	50.50
21		Gautam Gambhir	2010–11	6	6	0	0	0	100.00
22		Virat Kohli	2013–21	95	65	27	1	2	68.42
23		Ajinkya Rahane	2015	3	3	0	0	0	100.00
24		Rohit Sharma	2017–2025	56	42	12	1	1	75.00
25		Shikhar Dhawan	2021–22	12	7	3	0	2	58.33
26		KL Rahul	2022–25	15	10	5	0	0	66.67
27		Hardik Pandya	2023	3	2	1	0	0	66.67
28		Shubman Gill	2025-26	15	8	7	0	0	53.33
Total				1084	577	453	10	44	55.96

Last updated: 1 October 2026

=== T20I ===
This is a list of cricketers who have captained the Indian men's cricket team for at least one Twenty 20 International. 14 players have captained India in men's T20Is, of which Rohit Sharma is the most successful with 49 wins. India won the 2007 World T20, the inaugural T20 World Cup under the captaincy of Dhoni., later India win the 2024 T20 World Cup under the captaincy of Rohit Sharma. And again in India win 2026 T20 World Cup under the captaincy of Suryakumar Yadav.

Indian T20I Captains
Number	Image	Name	Year	Played	Won	Lost	Tied	No result	Win %
1		Virender Sehwag	2006	1	1	0	0	0	100.00
2		Mahendra Singh Dhoni	2007–2016	72	41	28	1	2	56.94
3		Suresh Raina	2010–2011	3	3	0	0	0	100.00
4		Ajinkya Rahane	2015	2	1	1	0	0	50.00
5		Virat Kohli	2017–2021	50	30	16	2	2	66.67
6		Rohit Sharma	2017–2024	62	49	12	1	0	79.03
7		Shikhar Dhawan	2021	3	1	2	0	0	33.33
8		Rishabh Pant	2022	5	2	2	0	1	50.00
9		Hardik Pandya	2022-2023	16	10	5	1	0	65.52
10		KL Rahul	2022	1	1	0	0	0	100.00
11		Jasprit Bumrah	2023	2	2	0	0	0	100.00
12		Ruturaj Gaikwad	2023	3	2	0	0	1	66.67
13		Suryakumar Yadav	2023-2026	52	42	8	2	2	82.00
14		Shubman Gill	2024	5	4	1	0	0	80.00
15		Shreyas Iyer	2026-present	27	15	10	0	2	60.00
Total				304	202	85	7	10	68.70

Last updated: 25 October 2026

=== Captains in Men's ICC tournaments ===
Indian Captains in ICC Tournaments
Tournament	Name	Captain's hometown	Format	Played	Won	Lost	Tied/NR	Stand	Winning rate
1975 Cricket World Cup	Srinivasaraghavan Venkataraghavan	Chennai	60 overs	3	1	2	0	Group Stage	33.3%
1979 Cricket World Cup	Srinivasaraghavan Venkataraghavan	Chennai	60 overs	3	0	3	0	Group Stage	0%
1983 Cricket World Cup	Kapil Dev	Chandigarh	60 overs	8	6	2	0	Champions	75%
1987 Cricket World Cup	Kapil Dev	Chandigarh	50 overs	7	5	2	0	Semi Finals	72%
1992 Cricket World Cup	Mohammad Azharuddin	Hyderabad	50 overs	8	2	5	1	Group Stage	25%
1996 Cricket World Cup	Mohammad Azharuddin	Hyderabad	50 overs	7	4	3	0	Semi Finals	57%
1998 ICC KnockOut Trophy	Mohammad Azharuddin	Hyderabad	50 overs	2	1	1	0	Semi Finals	50%
1999 Cricket World Cup	Mohammad Azharuddin	Hyderabad	50 overs	8	4	4	0	Super Six	50%
2000 ICC KnockOut Trophy	Sourav Ganguly	Kolkata	50 overs	4	3	1	0	Runners-up	75%
2002 ICC Champions Trophy	Sourav Ganguly	Kolkata	50 overs	4	3	0	1	Co-Champions	75%
2003 Cricket World Cup	Sourav Ganguly	Kolkata	50 overs	11	9	2	0	Runners-Up	82%
2004 ICC Champions Trophy	Sourav Ganguly	Kolkata	50 overs	2	1	1	0	Group Stage	50%
2006 ICC Champions Trophy	Rahul Dravid	Bangalore	50 overs	3	1	2	0	Group Stage	33.3%
2007 Cricket World Cup	Rahul Dravid	Bangalore	50 overs	3	1	2	0	Group Stage	33.3%
2007 World Twenty20	MS Dhoni	Ranchi	20 overs	7	5	1	1	Champions	71%
2009 World Twenty20	MS Dhoni	Ranchi	20 overs	5	2	3	0	Super 8	40%
2009 ICC Champions Trophy	MS Dhoni	Ranchi	50 overs	3	1	1	1	Group Stage	33.33%
2010 World Twenty20	MS Dhoni	Ranchi	20 overs	5	2	3	0	Super 8	40%
2011 Cricket World Cup	MS Dhoni	Ranchi	50 overs	9	7	1	1	Champions	77.7%
2012 World Twenty20	MS Dhoni	Ranchi	20 overs	5	4	1	0	Super 8	80%
2013 ICC Champions Trophy	MS Dhoni	Ranchi	50 overs	5	5	0	0	Champions	100%
2014 World Twenty20	MS Dhoni	Ranchi	20 overs	6	5	1	0	Runners-Up	83.3%
2015 Cricket World Cup	MS Dhoni	Ranchi	50 overs	8	7	1	0	Semi Finals	87.7%
2016 World Twenty20	MS Dhoni	Ranchi	20 overs	5	3	2	0	Semi Finals	60%
2017 ICC Champions Trophy	Virat Kohli	New Delhi	50 overs	5	3	2	0	Runners-Up	60%
2019 Cricket World Cup	Virat Kohli	New Delhi	50 overs	10	7	2	1	Semi Finals	70%
2021 World Test Championship final	Virat Kohli	New Delhi	Unlimited	1	0	1	0	Runners-Up	0
2021 World Twenty20	Virat Kohli	New Delhi	20 overs	5	3	2	0	Super-12	60%
2022 Men's T20 World Cup	Rohit Sharma	Mumbai	20 overs	6	4	2	0	Semi Finals	66.6%
2023 World Test Championship final	Rohit Sharma	Mumbai	Unlimited	1	0	1	0	Runners-Up	0
2023 Cricket World Cup	Rohit Sharma	Mumbai	50 overs	11	10	1	0	Runners-Up	91%
2024 Men's T20 World Cup	Rohit Sharma	Mumbai	20 overs	9	8	0	1	Champions	88.88%
2025 ICC Champions Trophy	Rohit Sharma	Mumbai	50 overs	5	5	0	0	Champions	100%
2026 Men's T20 World Cup	Suryakumar Yadav	Mumbai	20 overs	9	8	1	0	Champions	88.88%

== Women's ==
=== WTest ===
This is a list of cricketers who have captained the Indian women's cricket team for at least one women's Test match. Harmanpreet Kaur is the most successful test captains of Indian women's cricket team with four wins.

Last updated: 4 October 2026

Number	Image	Name	Span	Matches	Won	Lost	Drawn	Win %
1		Shantha Rangaswamy	1976-84	12	1	2	9	8.33
2		Nilima Jogalekar	1984-85	1	1	0	0	100.00
3		Diana Edulji	1985-86	4	0	0	4	0.00
4		Shubhangi Kulkarni	1986-91	3	0	1	2	0.00
5		Sandhya Agarwal	1991	1	0	1	0	0.00
6		Purnima Rau	1995	3	0	1	2	0.00
7		Pramila Bhatt	1995	1	0	0	1	0.00
8		Chanderkanta Kaul	1999	1	0	0	1	0.00
9		Anjum Chopra	2002	3	1	0	2	33.33
10		Mamatha Maben	2003	1	0	0	1	0.00
11		Mithali Raj	2005-21	8	3	1	4	37.50
12		Harmanpreet Kaur	2023-present	5	4	1	0	80.00
Total				43	10	7	27	23.26

=== WODI ===
This is a list of cricketers who have captained the Indian women's cricket team for at least one women's one-day international. Mithali Raj is the most successful WODI captain of Indian women's cricket team with 89 wins.

Last updated: 2 November 2025

Number	Image	Name	Span	Matches	Won	Lost	Tie	No Result	Win %
1		Diana Edulji	1978-93	18	7	11	0	0	38.88
2		Shantha Rangaswamy	1982-84	16	4	12	0	0	25.00
3		Shubhangi Kulkarni	1986	1	0	1	0	0	0.00
4		Purnima Rau	1995	8	5	3	0	0	62.50
5		Pramila Bhatt	1995-97	7	5	1	1	0	71.42
6		Chanderkanta Kaul	1999	4	3	1	0	0	75.00
7		Anju Jain	2000	8	5	3	0	0	62.50
8		Anjum Chopra	2002-12	28	10	17	0	1	35.71
9		Mamatha Maben	2003-04	19	14	5	0	0	73.68
10		Mithali Raj	2004-22	155	89	63	0	3	57.41
11		Jhulan Goswami	2008-11	25	12	13	0	0	48.00
12		Rumeli Dhar	2008	1	0	1	0	0	0.00
13		Harmanpreet Kaur	2013 – 2026	48	30	16	1	1	62.50
14		Smriti Mandhana	2024-Present	4	4	0	0	0	100.00
Total				342	188	147	2	5	56.08

=== WT20I ===
This is a list of cricketers who have captained the Indian women's cricket team for at least one Twenty 20 International. Harmanpreet Kaur is the most successful WT20I captain of Indian women's cricket team with 65 wins.

Last updated: 30 December 2025

Number	Image	Name	Span	Matches	Won	Lost	Tied	No result	Win %
1		Mithali Raj	2006–16	32	17	15	0	0	53.12
2		Jhulan Goswami	2008–15	18	8	10	0	0	44.44
3		Anjum Chopra	2012	10	3	7	0	0	30.00
4		Harmanpreet Kaur	2012–2026	132	78	48	1	5	59.09
5		Smriti Mandhana	2019–Present	17	10	6	0	1	58.82
Total				209	116	86	1	6	57.63

== Youth cricket ==
=== Youth test ===
This is a list of cricketers whose have captained the Indian Men's Under-19 cricket team for at least one under-19 Test match. Four men, Srikkanth, Shastri, Dravid and Kohli have gone on to captain the senior side.

Last updated:2019

S.No.	Name	Span	Matches	Won	Lost	Drawn
1	Krishnamachari Srikkanth	1978	2	0	0	2
2	Vedraj Chauhan	1978	3	0	0	3
3	Ravi Shastri	1981	3	0	0	3
4	Saba Karim	1984	2	0	1	1
5	Anju Mudkavi	1984	1	0	0	1
6	Amikar Dayal	1986	3	0	2	1
7	Myluahanan Senthilnathan	1987	1	0	1	0
8	Janardhanan Ramdas	1988	4	1	0	3
9	Ranjib Biswal	1989	4	1	0	3
10	Rahul Dravid	1991	2	1	0	1
11	Manoj Joglekar	1992	3	1	1	1
12	Sridharan Sriram	1993	3	1	1	1
13	Amit Sharma	1994	3	1	0	2
14	Kiran Powar	1994	3	0	2	1
15	Sanjay Raul	1995	3	1	1	1
16	Ajit Agarkar	1996	1	1	0	0
17	Jyoti Yadav	1996	2	1	0	1
18	Reetinder Singh Sodhi	1998	1	0	0	1
19	Ajay Ratra	2003	3	1	0	2
20	Manvinder Bisla	2002	1	0	0	1
21	Yaleeka Gnaneswara Rao	2002	2	0	1	1
22	Ambati Rayudu	2004/5	3	3	0	0
23	Tanmay Srivastava	2006-07	5	2	0	3
24	Piyush Chawla	2006-07	5	3	1	1
25	Virat Kohli	2008	2	1	0	1
26	Ashok Menaria	2009	2	1	1	0
27	Vijay Zol	2014	2	0	0	2
28	Jonty Sidhu	2017	2	0	0	2
29	Himanshu Rana	2017	2	2	0	0
30	Anuj Rawat	2018	2	2	0	0
31	Suraj Ahuja	2019	2	2	0	0
Total			77	26	12	39

=== Youth ODI ===
This is a list of cricketers who have captained the Indian men's U-19 cricket team for at least one youth ODI.

Last updated:December 2023

S.No.	Name	Span	Matches	Won	Lost	Tied	No Result	Win %
1	Ravi Shastri	1981	1	0	1	0	0	0.00
2	Saba Karim	1985	3	0	3	0	0	0.00
3	Anju Mudkavi	1985	1	0	1	0	0	0.00
4	Amikar Dayal	1986	3	1	2	0	0	33.33
5	M. Senthilnathan	1988	8	5	3	0	0	62.50
6	Arjan Kripal Singh	1988	1	0	1	0	0	0.00
7	Ranjib Biswal	1989-90	5	4	1	0	0	80.00
8	Rahul Dravid	1992	3	2	1	0	0	66.66
9	Manoj Joglekar	1993	3	3	0	0	0	100.00
10	Amit Sharma	1994	5	2	3	0	0	40.00
11	Kiran Powar	1995	3	1	2	0	0	33.33
12	Sanjay Raul	1996	3	3	0	0	0	100.00
13	Jyoti Yadav	1997-98	3	1	2	0	0	33.33
14	Amit Pagnis	1997	6	4	2	0	0	66.66
15	Reetinder Singh Sodhi	1999	3	3	0	0	0	100.00
16	Mohammad Kaif	1999-00	9	8	0	0	1	100.00
17	Ajay Ratra	2001	3	2	1	0	0	66.66
18	Parthiv Patel	2002	7	4	3	0	0	57.14
19	Yalaka Gnaneswara Rao	2002	3	3	0	0	0	100.00
20	Ambati Rayudu	2003-04	10	8	2	0	0	80.00
21	Dinesh Karthik	2004	1	0	1	0	0	0.00
22	Manoj Tiwary	2005	5	4	1	0	0	80.00
23	Ravikant Shukla	2005-06	17	15	2	0	0	88.23
24	Tanmay Srivastava	2006-07	7	7	0	0	0	100.00
25	Piyush Chawla	2006-07	12	11	1	0	0	91.66
26	Ravindra Jadeja	2007	1	1	0	0	0	100.00
27	Virat Kohli	2008	11	11	0	0	0	100.00
28	Ashok Menaria	2009-10	12	8	4	0	0	66.66
29	Unmukt Chand	2011-12	21	15	5	1	0	73.80
30	Vijay Zol	2013-14	22	18	3	0	1	85.71
31	Sanju Samson	2014	1	1	0	0	0	100.00
32	Ricky Bhui	2015	4	4	0	0	0	100.00
33	Virat Singh	2015	1	1	0	0	0	100.00
34	Rishabh Pant	2015	1	1	0	0	0	100.00
35	Ishan Kishan	2015	8	7	1	0	0	87.50
36	Abhishek Sharma	2016	5	3	1	1	0	70.00
37	Himanshu Rana	2017	3	2	1	0	0	66.66
38	Prithvi Shaw	2018	11	11	0	0	0	100.00
39	Aryan Juyal	2018	5	3	2	0	0	60.00
40	Pawan Shah	2018	1	1	0	0	0	100.00
41	Prab Simran Singh	2018	2	2	0	0	0	100.00
42	Priyam Garg	2019	20	16	4	0	0	80.00
43	Dhruv Jurel	2019	5	4	1	0	0	80.00
44	Shubhang Hedge	2019	4	1	2	0	1	33.33
45	Yash Dhull	2021-22	8	7	1	0	0	87.50
46	Nishant Sindhu	2022	2	2	0	0	0	100.00
47	Uday Saharan	2023	3	1	2	0	0	33.33
Total			276	211	60	2	3	76.44

== See also ==
- List of India national cricket coaches
