= Indian cricket team in Zimbabwe in 2015 =

International cricket tour

	Zimbabwe	India
- Dates: 10 July 2015 – 19 July 2015
Captains	Elton Chigumbura; Sikandar Raza (2nd T20I)	Ajinkya Rahane

One Day International series
- Results: India won the 3-match series 3–0
Most runs	Chamu Chibhabha (157)	Ambati Rayudu (165)
Most wickets	Neville Madziva (6)	Stuart Binny (6)
- Player of the series: Ambati Rayudu (Ind)

Twenty20 International series
- Results: 2-match series drawn 1–1
Most runs	Chamu Chibhabha (90)	Robin Uthappa (81)
Most wickets	Graeme Cremer (4) and Chris Mpofu (4)	Axar Patel (4)
- Player of the series: Chamu Chibhabha (Zim)

The Indian cricket team toured Zimbabwe from 10 to 19 July 2015. The tour consisted of three One Day International matches and two Twenty20 Internationals. All the matches were played in Harare. India won the ODI series 3–0 and the T20I series was drawn 1–1. Zimbabwe's win in the second T20I match was their first Twenty20 win over India.

In June Zimbabwe Cricket stated that the tour could be postponed to the next year, if broadcasting issues were not resolved. Sources close to the Board of Control for Cricket in India (BCCI) suggested that the tour would go ahead with India fielding a second-strength side, with the selection committee meeting in Delhi on 29 June to pick the squads. Indian team director Ravi Shastri missed the tour due to professional commitments that were agreed before the BCCI extended his contract. The Indian squad was announced on 29 June as planned.

== Squads ==
ODIs		T20Is	
Zimbabwe	India	Zimbabwe	India
Elton Chigumbura (c); Chamu Chibhabha; Graeme Cremer; Craig Ervine; Luke Jongwe; Roy Kaia; Tafadzwa Kamungozi; Neville Madziva; Hamilton Masakadza; Chris Mpofu; Richmond Mutumbami; Tinashe Panyangara; Sikandar Raza; Vusi Sibanda; Donald Tiripano; Prosper Utseya; Brian Vitori; Malcolm Waller; Sean Williams	Ajinkya Rahane (c); Stuart Binny; Kedar Jadhav; Dhawal Kulkarni; Bhuvneshwar Kumar; Manish Pandey; Axar Patel; ~~Ambati Rayudu~~; Sanju Samson; ~~Karn Sharma~~; Mohit Sharma; Sandeep Sharma; Harbhajan Singh; Manoj Tiwary; Robin Uthappa; Murali Vijay	Elton Chigumbura (c); Chamu Chibhabha; Graeme Cremer; Craig Ervine; Luke Jongwe; Roy Kaia; Tafadzwa Kamungozi; Neville Madziva; Hamilton Masakadza; Chris Mpofu; Richmond Mutumbami; Taurai Muzarabani; Tinashe Panyangara; Sikandar Raza; Vusi Sibanda; Donald Tiripano; Prosper Utseya; Brian Vitori; Malcolm Waller; Sean Williams	Ajinkya Rahane (c); Stuart Binny; Kedar Jadhav; Dhawal Kulkarni; Bhuvneshwar Kumar; Manish Pandey; Axar Patel; ~~Ambati Rayudu~~; Sanju Samson; ~~Karn Sharma~~; Mohit Sharma; Sandeep Sharma; Harbhajan Singh; Manoj Tiwary; Robin Uthappa; Murali Vijay

On 6 July Indian bowler Karn Sharma was ruled out of the tour after fracturing a finger in his left hand. There was no replacement for him. This left the Indian team with only two spin options of Harbhajan Singh and Axar Patel. Indian batsman Ambati Rayudu was ruled out of the tour after the second ODI due to a quadriceps injury. He was replaced by Sanju Samson.

== ODI series ==
=== 1st ODI ===
10 July 2015
09:00
Scorecard

India; 255/6 (50 overs)	v	Zimbabwe; 251/7 (50 overs)
Ambati Rayudu 124* (133); Chamu Chibhabha 2/25 (10 overs)		Elton Chigumbura 104* (101); Axar Patel 2/41 (10 overs)

India won by 4 runs
Harare Sports Club, Harare
Umpires: Simon Fry (Aus) and Russell Tiffin (Zim)
Player of the match: Ambati Rayudu (Ind)

- Zimbabwe won the toss and elected to field.
- Ajinkya Rahane (Ind) captained India for the first time in ODIs.
- Ambati Rayudu and Stuart Binny's partnership of 160 was the highest sixth-wicket partnership for India in ODIs.

=== 2nd ODI ===
12 July 2015
09:00
Scorecard

India; 271/8 (50 overs)	v	Zimbabwe; 209 (49 overs)
Murali Vijay 72 (95); Neville Madziva 4/49 (10 overs)		Chamu Chibhabha 72 (100); Bhuvneshwar Kumar 4/33 (10 overs)

India won by 62 runs
Harare Sports Club, Harare
Umpires: Simon Fry (Aus) and Jeremiah Matibiri (Zim)
Player of the match: Murali Vijay (Ind)

- Zimbabwe won the toss and elected to field.

=== 3rd ODI ===
14 July 2015
09:00
Scorecard

India; 276/5 (50 overs)	v	Zimbabwe; 193 (42.4 overs)
Kedar Jadhav 105* (87); Neville Madziva 2/59 (9 overs)		Chamu Chibhabha 82(109); Stuart Binny 3/55 (10 overs)

India won by 83 runs
Harare Sports Club, Harare
Umpires: Simon Fry (Aus) and Jeremiah Matibiri (Zim)
Player of the match: Kedar Jadhav (Ind)

- Zimbabwe won the toss and elected to field.
- Manish Pandey (Ind) made his ODI debut.
- Kedar Jadhav (Ind) scored his first century in ODIs.

== T20I series ==
=== 1st T20I ===
17 July 2015
13:00
Scorecard

India; 178/5 (20 overs)	v	Zimbabwe; 124/7 (20 overs)
Robin Uthappa 39* (35); Christopher Mpofu 3/33 (4 overs)		Hamilton Masakadza 28 (24); Axar Patel 3/17 (4 overs)

India won by 54 runs
Harare Sports Club, Harare
Umpires: Jeremiah Matibiri (Zim) and Russell Tiffin (Zim)
Player of the match: Axar Patel (Ind)

- India won the toss and elected to bat.
- Ajinkya Rahane (Ind) captained India for the first time in T20Is.
- Stuart Binny, Kedar Jadhav, Manish Pandey, Axar Patel & Sandeep Sharma (Ind) and Neville Madziva & Taurai Muzarabani (Zim) made their T20I debuts.

=== 2nd T20I ===
19 July 2015
13:00
Scorecard

Zimbabwe; 145/7 (20 overs)	v	India; 135/9 (20 overs)
Chamu Chibhabha 67 (51); Bhuvneshwar Kumar 2/26 (4 overs)		Robin Uthappa 42 (25); Graeme Cremer 3/18 (4 overs)

Zimbabwe won by 10 runs
Harare Sports Club, Harare
Umpires: Langton Rusere (Zim) and Russell Tiffin (Zim)
Player of the match: Chamu Chibhabha (Zim)

- Zimbabwe won the toss and elected to bat.
- Sanju Samson (Ind) made his T20I debut.
- Sikandar Raza stood as captain for Zimbabwe for this match as Elton Chigumbura was injured.
- This was Zimbabwe's first win in a T20I at the Harare Sports Club in ten attempts.
