= Joglekar =

Joglekar is an Indian name. It may refer to:

- Archana Joglekar, Indian actress
- Gautam Joglekar, Indian actor
- Manoj Joglekar (born 1973), Indian cricketer
- Padmaja Phenany Joglekar, Hindustani Classical singer
- Vasant Joglekar, Indian film director
