= Irish cricket team in Zimbabwe in 2015–16 =

International cricket tour

	Zimbabwe	Ireland
- Dates: 9 – 20 October 2015
Captains	Elton Chigumbura	William Porterfield

One Day International series
- Results: Zimbabwe won the 3-match series 2–1
Most runs	Craig Ervine (161)	Gary Wilson (154)
Most wickets	Wellington Masakadza (4)	Tim Murtagh (6)
- Player of the series: Sikandar Raza (Zim)

The Irish cricket team toured Zimbabwe between 9 and 20 October 2015. The tour consisted of three One Day International (ODI) matches and a four-day game. Zimbabwe won the three-match ODI series 2–1 and the tour match was drawn.

== Squads ==
Zimbabwe	Ireland
Elton Chigumbura (c); Brian Chari; Chamu Chibhabha; Craig Ervine; Luke Jongwe; Neville Madziva; Wellington Masakadza; Taurai Muzarabani; Richmond Mutumbami; Taurai Muzarabani; John Nyumbu; Tinashe Panyangara; Sikandar Raza; Malcolm Waller; Sean Williams	William Porterfield (c); Andrew Balbirnie; George Dockrell; Ed Joyce; John Mooney; Tim Murtagh; Andrew McBrine; Kevin O'Brien; Niall O'Brien; Stuart Poynter; Max Sorensen; Paul Stirling; Stuart Thompson; Gary Wilson; Craig Young

== ODI series ==
=== 1st ODI ===
9 October 2015
Scorecard

Ireland; 219/8 (50 overs)	v	Zimbabwe; 222/8 (49 overs)
Gary Wilson 70* (88); John Nyumbu 2/35 (10 overs)		Sikandar Raza 60* (72); George Dockrell 2/29 (10 overs)

Zimbabwe won by 2 wickets
Harare Sports Club, Harare
Umpires: Johan Cloete (SA) and Russell Tiffin (Zim)
Player of the match: Sikandar Raza (Zim)

- Zimbabwe won the toss and elected to field.
- Wellington Masakadza (Zim) made his ODI debut.

=== 2nd ODI ===
11 October 2015
Scorecard

Ireland; 268/7 (50 overs)	v	Zimbabwe; 270/5 (48.3 overs)
Paul Stirling 72 (77); Sikandar Raza 3/49 (10 overs)		Craig Ervine 101* (122); Kevin O'Brien 2/46 (10 overs)

Zimbabwe won by 5 wickets
Harare Sports Club, Harare
Umpires: Johan Cloete (SA) and Jeremiah Matibiri (Zim)
Player of the match: Craig Ervine (Zim)

- Zimbabwe won the toss and elected to field.

=== 3rd ODI ===
13 October 2015
Scorecard

Zimbabwe; 187 (49.2 overs)	v	Ireland; 189/8 (46.5 overs)
Sean Williams 51 (69); Tim Murtagh 4/32 (10 overs)		Paul Stirling 50 (92); Wellington Masakadza 2/31 (8 overs)

Ireland won by 2 wickets
Harare Sports Club, Harare
Umpires: Johan Cloete (SA) and Russell Tiffin (Zim)
Player of the match: Tim Murtagh (Ire)

- Ireland won the toss and elected to field.
- Taurai Muzarabani (Zim) made his ODI debut.

== Tour match ==
=== First-class: Zimbabwe A vs Ireland ===
17 – 20 October
Scorecard

Zimbabwe A	v	Ireland
392 (102.3 overs); Malcolm Waller 138 (183); John Mooney 4/74 (21 overs)		353 (95.4 overs); Stuart Poynter 125 (166); Trevor Garwe 4/61 (19.4 overs)
346/6d (71 overs); Malcolm Waller 118 (166); Kevin O'Brien 2/34 (10 overs)		271/5 (81.5 overs); John Mooney 65 (106); Brian Vitori 2/51 (16 overs)

Match drawn
Harare Sports Club, Harare
Umpires: Iknow Chabi (Zim) and Owen Chirombe (Zim)

- Zimbabwe A won the toss and elected to bat.
