= Stuart Binny =

Indian cricketer

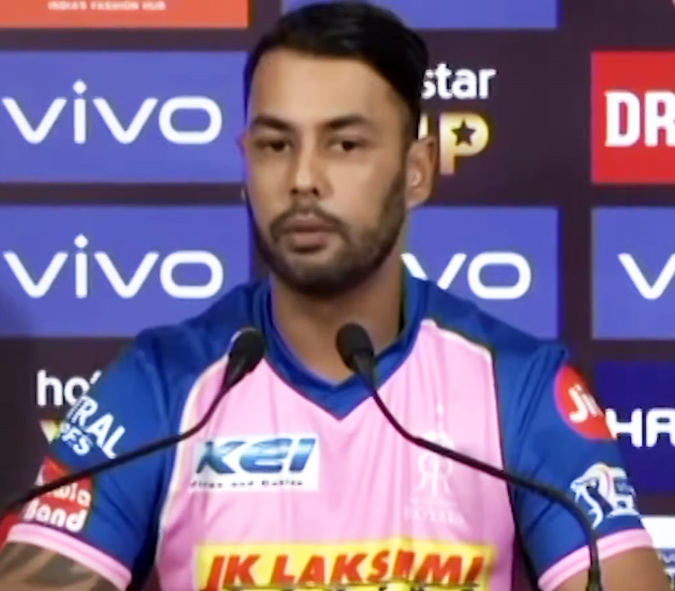
- Stuart Binny in 2019

Personal information
- Full name: Stuart Terence Roger Binny
- Born: 3 June 1984 (age 42); Bangalore, Karnataka, India
- Batting: Right-handed
- Bowling: Right-arm medium-fast
- Role: All-rounder
- Relatives: Roger Binny (father); Mayanti Langer (m. 2012) (wife)

International information
- National side: India (2014–2016)
- Test debut (cap 281): 9 July 2014 v England
- Last Test: 14 November 2015 v South Africa
- ODI debut (cap 200): 28 January 2014 v New Zealand
- Last ODI: 11 October 2015 v South Africa
- ODI shirt no.: 84
- T20I debut (cap 50): 17 July 2015 v Zimbabwe
- Last T20I: 27 August 2016 v West Indies
- T20I shirt no.: 84

Domestic team information
- Years: Team
- 2003/04–2018/19: Karnataka
- 2007–2009: Hyderabad Heroes
- 2010: Mumbai Indians
- 2011–2015: Rajasthan Royals (squad no. 84)
- 2016–2017: Royal Challengers Bangalore (squad no. 84)
- 2017: Belagavi Panthers
- 2018–2019: Rajasthan Royals (squad no. 84)
- 2019/20–2021: Nagaland

Career statistics
| Competition | Test | ODI | T20I | FC |
|---|---|---|---|---|
| Matches | 6 | 14 | 3 | 95 |
| Runs scored | 194 | 230 | 35 | 4,796 |
| Batting average | 21.55 | 28.75 | 17.50 | 34.25 |
| 100s/50s | 0/1 | 0/1 | 0/0 | 11/22 |
| Top score | 78 | 77 | 24 | 189 |
| Balls bowled | 450 | 490 | 30 | 9,394 |
| Wickets | 3 | 20 | 1 | 148 |
| Bowling average | 86.00 | 21.95 | 54.00 | 32.36 |
| 5 wickets in innings | 0 | 1 | 0 | 3 |
| 10 wickets in match | 0 | 0 | 0 | 1 |
| Best bowling | 2/24 | 6/4 | 1/14 | 5/49 |
| Catches/stumpings | 4/– | 3/– | 0/– | 34/– |
Medal record
Men's Cricket
Representing India
ICC T20 World Cup
| Runner-up | 2014 Bangladesh |
- Source: ESPNcricinfo, 30 August 2021

Stuart Terence Roger Binny (born 3 June 1984) is an Indian former international cricketer, who played One Day Internationals, Twenty20 Internationals, and Tests. He played for various teams like Rajasthan Royals, Mumbai Indians and Royal Challengers Bangalore in the Indian Premier League. On 30 August 2021, Binny announced his retirement from all formats of cricket.

Binny was the Indian record holder for best bowling spell in an ODI, as he claimed 6 wickets for 4 runs against Bangladesh in 2014, until his record was broken by Mohammad Shami, against New Zealand in 2023 ICC Men's Cricket World Cup, when Shami claimed 7 wickets for 57 runs with a figure of 9.5-0-57-7.

== Early and personal life ==
He is the son of former Indian Test cricketer Roger Binny. He was born in Bangalore and attended middle school in The Frank Anthony Public School, Bangalore. He attended high school in The St. Joseph's Indian High School where his father Roger Binny was the school cricket coach for that period. He also took coaching in IACA under coach Imtiaz Ahmed.

Stuart Binny married Mayanti Langer in 2012. He played for Rajasthan Royals in the Indian Premier League 2018 edition. In 2019, Binny detailed the highs and lows of his cricketing career in the Hindustan Times article, Almost Famous: A life in cricket.

== Domestic career ==
He made his Karnataka debut in the 2003/04 season but could not maintain a regular place in the first-class line-up. He considers himself a limited-overs specialist and when the Indian Cricket League began in 2007, he signed up and made a name for himself as one of the tournament's premier all-rounders. After two fulfilling seasons, he accepted the BCCI's amnesty offer and quit the ICL.

In IPL 2010, he was bought by IPL franchise Mumbai Indians. In IPL 2011, Binny was bought by the Rajasthan Royals. During the IPL 2016 auctions, he was bagged by Royal Challengers Bangalore for a price of 2 crore INR.

Binny, afterward, started to perform well in domestic competitions. He amassed 283 runs in Shimoga, taking his tournament tally to 686 runs at an average of 76.22, making him the third-highest run-getter in the league stage.

Most of his runs have come in fire-fighting causes, yet they have been scored at a strike-rate of 83.55, and have included 14 sixes the most by a single player in the season. He took 20 wickets at 20.10 during the 2011–12 Ranji Trophy season including 10 wickets in the match against Odisha. In the IPL, Binny hit 32 not out off 13 balls against Pune Warriors India to help Royals get to their target of 179 with a ball and five wickets to spare and thus keep their 100% record in Jaipur intact.

Binny's unbeaten 41 against Chennai Super Kings where he partnered Shane Watson at the end, put Royals in the playoffs. In their next match against Mumbai Indians, he turned the floundering innings around with an unbeaten 37 threatening Mumbai Indians after they had reduced Royals to 28 for 4.

In September 2019, Binny moved from Karnataka to Nagaland cricket team for the 2019–20 Ranji Trophy. He was released by the Rajasthan Royals ahead of the 2020 IPL auction.

He was played in the Legends League Cricket in the first season for Gujarat Giants and the second season for Urbanrisers Hyderabad.

== International career ==
Stuart Binny was picked for India's ODI team for the tour of New Zealand 2014. He played his first One day International match on 28 January 2014 where he bowled an over in which he gave 8 runs and didn't bat in the match. He also played in the Arise Asia Cup 2014 and scored a duck. On 17 June 2014 against Bangladesh Binny secured six wickets conceding only four runs surpassing Anil Kumble to have the best bowling record for any Indian bowler. He also scored alone 25* in the 3rd match vs Bangladesh, before the match being called off due to rain. He made his Test Debut in the 1st Test against England in tour of England 2014 and scored 1 run in his debut innings and 78 runs in the second innings. He was picked in 15-man squad for Cricket World Cup 2015 in Australia and New Zealand. He did not play a single match in the tournament.

Binny was later selected for the 2nd and 3rd test matches in Sri Lanka in August 2015, this came as a surprise pick after the Indians lost to Sri Lanka in the first test. He was swapped with Harbhajan Singh, he took 3 wickets for 2 innings and scored 15 and 8 in the first and second innings.

He made his Twenty20 International debut for India against Zimbabwe on 17 July 2015.
