= Indian cricket team in Bangladesh in 2014 =

India in Bangladesh in 2014
	Bangladesh	India
- Dates: 15 June – 19 June 2014
Captains	Mushfiqur Rahim	Suresh Raina

One Day International series
- Results: India won the 3-match series 2–0
Most runs	Mushfiqur Rahim (70)	Robin Uthappa (69)
Most wickets	Taskin Ahmed (7)	Stuart Binny (6)
- Player of the series: Stuart Binny (Ind)

The Indian national cricket team toured Bangladesh from 15 to 19 June 2014 to play a three-match One Day International (ODI) series against the Bangladesh national cricket team. India won the ODI series 2–0, with one match being abandoned due to rain.

== Squads ==
Bangladesh	India
Mushfiqur Rahim (c & wk); Tamim Iqbal; Anamul Haque; Mominul Haque; Shamsur Rahman; Shakib Al Hasan; Nasir Hossain; Mithun Ali (wk); Mahmudullah; Ziaur Rahman; Sohag Gazi; Abdur Razzak; Mashrafe Mortaza; Taskin Ahmed; Al-Amin Hossain	Suresh Raina (c); Robin Uthappa; Ajinkya Rahane; Cheteshwar Pujara; Ambati Rayudu; Manoj Tiwary; Kedar Jadhav; Wriddhiman Saha (wk); Stuart Binny; Parvez Rasool; Akshar Patel; Amit Mishra; Vinay Kumar; Umesh Yadav; Mohit Sharma

== ODI series ==
=== 1st ODI ===
15 June 2014
13:00 (local time) (D/N)
Scorecard

Bangladesh; 272/9 (50 overs)	v	India; 153/3 (24.5 overs)
Mushfiqur Rahim 59 (63); Umesh Yadav 3/48 (9 overs)		Ajinkya Rahane 64 (70); Shakib Al Hasan 2/27 (6 overs)

India won by 7 wickets (D/L method)
Sher-e-Bangla Stadium, Mirpur
Umpires: Kumar Dharmasena (SL) and Enamul Haque (Ban)
Player of the match: Ajinkya Rahane (Ind)

- Bangladesh won the toss and elected to bat first.
• India being set a revised target 150 runs due to rain.

=== 2nd ODI ===
17 June 2014
13:00 (local time) (D/N)
Scorecard

India; 105 (25.3 overs)	v	Bangladesh; 58 (17.4 overs)
Suresh Raina 27 (23); Taskin Ahmed 5/28 (8 overs)		Mithun Ali 26 (39); Stuart Binny 6/4 (4.4 overs)

India won by 47 runs (D/L method)
Sher-e-Bangla Stadium, Mirpur
Umpires: Kumar Dharmasena (SL) and Sharfuddoula (Ban)
Player of the match: Stuart Binny (Ind)

- Bangladesh won the toss and elected to field.
- Rain after 5.2 overs of the Indian innings reduced the game to 41 overs per side, with Bangladesh set a target of 106 runs to win on the Duckworth–Lewis method.
- Mithun Ali and Taskin Ahmed (both Ban) made their ODI debuts.
- Stuart Binny's figures of 6/4 were the best bowling figures by an Indian in ODIs till it was broken by Mohammed Shami's 7/57 in the 2023 World Cup semi-final vs New Zealand.
- Bangladesh's total of 58 was the lowest total by any team against India in ODIs.
- India's total of 105 was the lowest total to be successfully defended in an ODI after being bowled out.

=== 3rd ODI ===
19 June 2014
13:00 (local time) (D/N)
Scorecard

India; 119/9 (34.2 overs)	v	Bangladesh
Cheteshwar Pujara 27 (63); Shakib Al Hasan 3/27 (7.2 overs)

No result
Sher-e-Bangla Stadium, Mirpur
Umpires: Kumar Dharmasena (SL) and Enamul Haque (Ban)

- India won the toss and elected to bat.
- Rain after 12.3 overs of the Indian innings reduced the game to 40 overs per side. Rain after 34.2 overs of the Indian innings forced the game to be abandoned.
- Cheteshwar Pujara (Ind) played in his last ODI.

== Broadcasters ==
Country	TV broadcaster(s)
Bangladesh	Gazi Television
Canada	Willow
India	Star Sports 1 (English feed); Star Sports 3 (Hindi feed); Star Sports HD 1 (HD Version)
Middle East	OSN Sports Cricket HD
Pakistan	GEO Super
South Africa	SuperSport
United States	Willow
