= Arvind Pujara =

Indian cricketer (born 1950)

Personal information
- Full name: Arvind Shivlal Pujara
- Born: 21 December 1950 (age 75); Rajkot, Saurashtra, India
- Role: Batsman; Occasional wicket-keeper
- Relatives: Cheteshwar Pujara (son); Bipin Pujara (brother); Shivlal Pujara (father)

Domestic team information
- Years: Team
- 1976–1980: Saurashtra

Career statistics
Competition	First-class
Matches	6
Runs scored	172
Batting average	14.33
100s/50s	0/1
Top score	60
Catches/stumpings	1/1
- Source: ESPNcricinfo, 25 March 2014

Arvind Shivlal Pujara (born 21 December 1950) is a former Indian cricketer who played first-class cricket for Saurashtra from 1976 to 1980. He is the father and coach of the Indian Test batsman Cheteshwar Pujara.

== Career ==
An opening batsman and occasional wicket-keeper, Pujara's best performance in his six matches came in the Ranji Trophy match against Gujarat in 1978–79, when he made 27 and 60, Saurashtra's top score in the match.

== Personal life ==
Arvind and his wife Reena recognised Cheteshwar's ability in early childhood. Lacking the money to provide coaching for him, Arvind, who worked for the railways as a clerk, bowled to him daily before and after work, using the railways ground near their home in Rajkot. Over two decades he also coached several other local boys for no charge, several of whom have since played for Saurashtra. He runs an academy for cricketers at Rajkot. Arvind's younger brother Bipin Pujara also played for Saurashtra.
