= Mayanti Langer =

Indian sports journalist and anchor

- Born: 8 February 1985 (age 41); New Delhi, India
- Occupations: TV anchor; Television presenter
- Years active: 2007–present
- Employer: Star Sports
- Spouse: Stuart Binny (m. 2012)
- Parents: Lt. Gen. Sanjiv Langer (Retd.); Preminda Langer
- Relatives: Roger Binny (Father-in-law)

Mayanti Langer (born 8 February 1985) is an Indian sports journalist, anchor and broadcaster working with Star India on cricket matches.

She has hosted many tournaments like Football Cafe on Zee Sports, 2010 FIFA World Cup broadcast on ESPN, 2010 Commonwealth Games, 2011 Cricket World Cup, 2014 Indian Super League, 2015 ICC Cricket World Cup, 2018 Indian Premier League, 2019 Indian Premier League and 2019 Cricket World Cup.

== Media career ==
Her interest in football grew when she was a student in the United States. She was in her college football team and was a guest anchor for a broadcast of FIFA beach football.

With the success of the broadcast, she was offered a spot as host and associate producer for Football Cafe on Zee Sports. Langer would go on to work for various football shows on the Zee network providing commentary and conduct interviews during pre-match, half-time and post-match shows. She was also the anchor on Zee Sports for the Nehru Cup football tournament held in New Delhi at the Ambedkar Stadium and worked as an anchor for Zee Sports' coverage of the Indian Cricket League.

She was a host in the 2010 FIFA World Cup broadcast in India, on ESPN which included pre-match, half-match and post-match analysis. She headed a team of expert panelists alongside John Dykes. Mayanti also hosted the 2010 Commonwealth Games held at Delhi with Charu Sharma, the 2011 Cricket World Cup, the 2014 Indian Super League, the 2015 ICC Cricket World Cup and the 2018 Indian Premier League.

== Personal life ==
She is the daughter of Indian army officer Lt. Gen. Sanjiv Langer and Preminda Langer. Mayanti married Indian cricketer Stuart Binny in 2012.
