= Toyam Hyderabad =

Cricket franchise

Urbanrisers Hyderabad
- League: Legends League Cricket

Personnel
- Captain: Suresh Raina
- Coach: Nikhil Chopra
- Owner: Urbanrise & Pavan Reddy JC

Team information
- City: Hyderabad, India
- Founded: 2023; 3 years ago
- Official website: Official website

Toyam Hyderabad formerly known as Urbanrisers Hyderabad(2023) are a professional cricket franchise team that competes in the Legends League Cricket in India. Franchise was founded in 2023 and is owned by the Urbanrise & Pavan Reddy JC. Team led by current captain Suresh Raina and head coach is Nikhil Chopra.

In the very first season of 2023, they performed brilliantly and made it to the finals and were the runner-up.

== Current squad ==
- Suresh Raina (c)
- Martin Guptil
- Dwayne Smith
- Peter Trego
- Chamara Kapugedera
- Stuart Binny
- Asghar Afghan
- Tino Best
- Amit Paunikar
- Mohnish Mishra
- Christopher Mpofu
- Pawan Suyal
- Jerome Taylor
- Sudeep Tyagi
- Yogesh Nagar
- Shivakant Shukla
- Pragyan Ojha
- Devendra Bishoo
- Tirumalasetti Suman
- Shadab Jakati
- Gurkeerat Mann
- Rikki Clarke
