= South African cricket team in India in 2007–08 =

	South Africa	India
- Dates: 20 March 2008 – 15 April 2008
Captains	Graeme Smith	Anil Kumble; Mahendra Singh Dhoni (3rd Test)

Test series
- Result: 3-match series drawn 1–1
Most runs	Neil McKenzie (341)	Virender Sehwag (372)
Most wickets	Dale Steyn (15)	Harbhajan Singh (19)
- Player of the series: Harbhajan Singh (IND)

The South African cricket team toured India between 26 March and 13 April 2008, playing 3 Tests against India. The series was tied 1–1.

== Squads ==
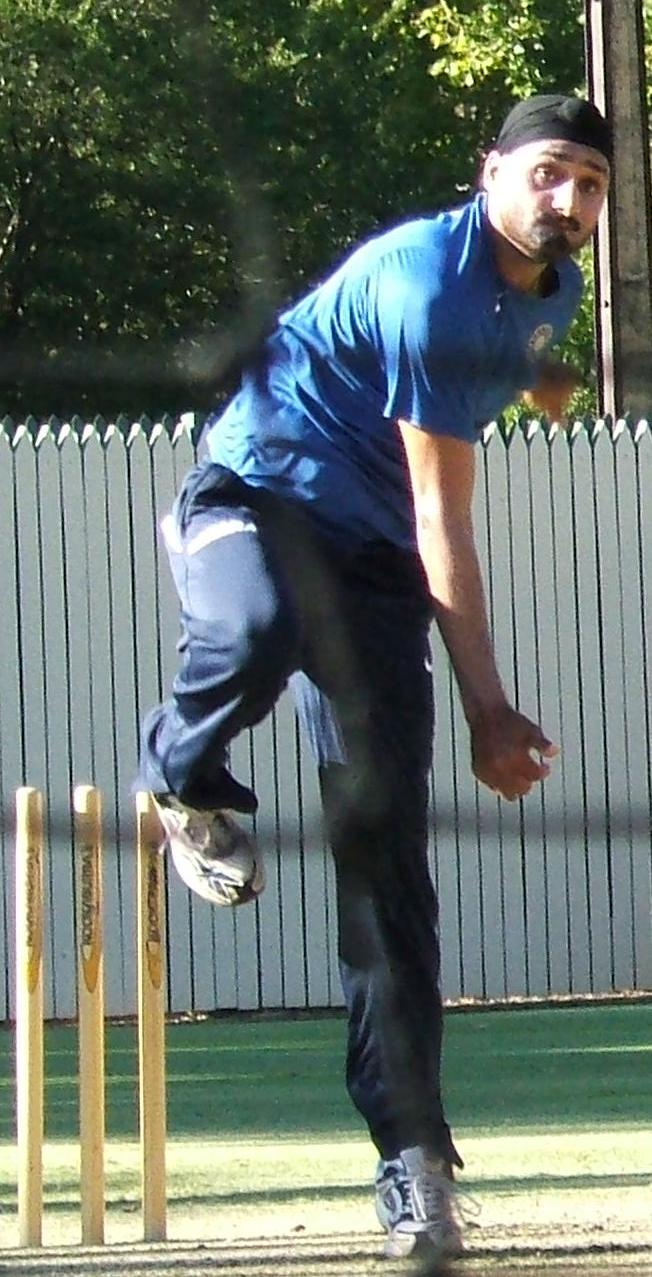
Harbhajan, pictured here bowling in the nets, was the man of the series.

Test Squads
India	South Africa
Anil Kumble (c)	Graeme Smith (c)
Mahendra Singh Dhoni (wk)	Mark Boucher (wk)
Wasim Jaffer	Ashwell Prince
Virender Sehwag	Hashim Amla
Rahul Dravid	AB de Villiers
Sachin Tendulkar	Jean-Paul Duminy
Saurav Ganguly	Paul Harris
V V S Laxman	Jacques Kallis
Yuvraj Singh	Charl Langeveldt
Irfan Pathan	Neil McKenzie
Harbhajan Singh	Morné Morkel
Murali Kartik	Makhaya Ntini
Rudra Pratap Singh	Robin Peterson
S. Sreesanth	Dale Steyn

== Test series ==
=== 1st Test ===
26 March – 30 March
Scorecard

South Africa	v	India
540 (152.5 overs); Hashim Amla 159 (262); Harbhajan Singh 6/164 (44.5 overs)		627 (155.1 overs); Virender Sehwag 319 (304); Dale Steyn 4/103 (32 overs)
331/5(dec) (109 overs); Neil McKenzie 155* (339); Harbhajan Singh 3/101 (34 overs)

Match Drawn
M. A. Chidambaram Stadium, Chennai
Umpires: Asad Rauf and Tony Hill
Player of the match: Virender Sehwag (IND)

- Virender Sehwag's 309* on day three was the second time an Indian has scored a triple century. Sehwag also scored the first one.
- Sehwag became the first Indian batsman to score two triple centuries in tests.
- Sehwag also scored the fastest triple century in terms of deliveries (278).
- Sehwag is the third batsman after Brian Lara and Don Bradman to score two triple centuries.
- Sehwag scored 257 runs on day three, making him the first batsman to score more than 250 runs in a day in a test match in over 50 years. There are only three other batsman that bettered this: Don Bradman twice (309) and (271), Wally Hammond (295), and Denis Compton (273).
- Sehwag is also the first batsman to be involved in two double century stands, 213 for the first wicket and a 268 run partnership for the second wicket. This also the first time that a double century stand has occurred for the first and second wicket in an innings.
- Each of Sehwag's last ten centuries have been greater than 150.
- In the 14 innings when Sehwag has scored a century, his strike rate has been 77.79. Among batsmen with at least ten Test hundreds, only Adam Gilchrist has a faster strike-rate in centuries (99.64).

=== 2nd Test ===
3 – 7 April
Scorecard

India	v	South Africa
76 (20 overs); Irfan Pathan 21* (17); Dale Steyn 5/23 (8 overs)		494/7(dec) (141.2 overs); AB de Villiers 217* (333); Harbhajan Singh 4/135 (40 overs)
328 (94.2 overs); Sourav Ganguly 87 (149); Makhaya Ntini 3/44 (16.2 overs)

South Africa won by an innings & 90 runs
Sardar Patel Stadium, Motera, Ahmedabad
Umpires: Billy Doctrove (WIN) and Tony Hill (NZL)
Player of the match: AB de Villiers (SA)

=== 3rd Test ===
11 – 15 April
Scorecard

South Africa	v	India
265 (87.3 overs); Graeme Smith 69 (134); Harbhajan Singh 3/52 (31 overs)		325 (99.4 overs); Sourav Ganguly 87 (119); Morné Morkel 3/57 (13 overs)
121 (55.5 overs); Graeme Smith 35 (90); Harbhajan Singh 4/44 (23 overs)		64/2 (13.1 overs); Virender Sehwag 22 (12); Morné Morkel 1/8 (5 overs)

India won by 8 wickets
Green Park Stadium, Kanpur
Umpires: Asad Rauf (PAK) and Billy Doctrove (WIN)
Player of the match: Sourav Ganguly (IND)

- MS Dhoni (Ind) captained India for the first time in Tests.
