= 2014 Zimbabwe Tri-Series =

Zimbabwe Triangular Series
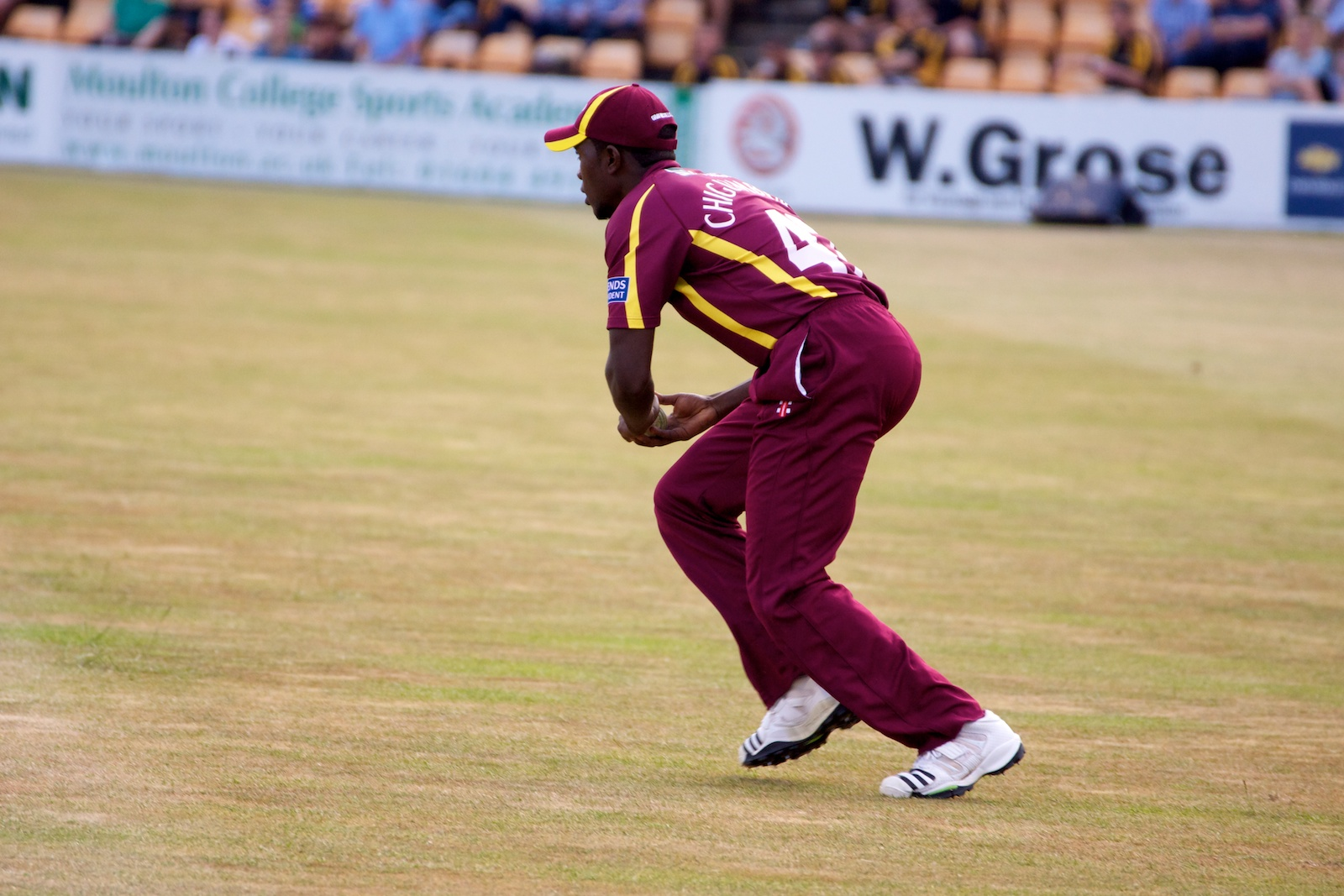
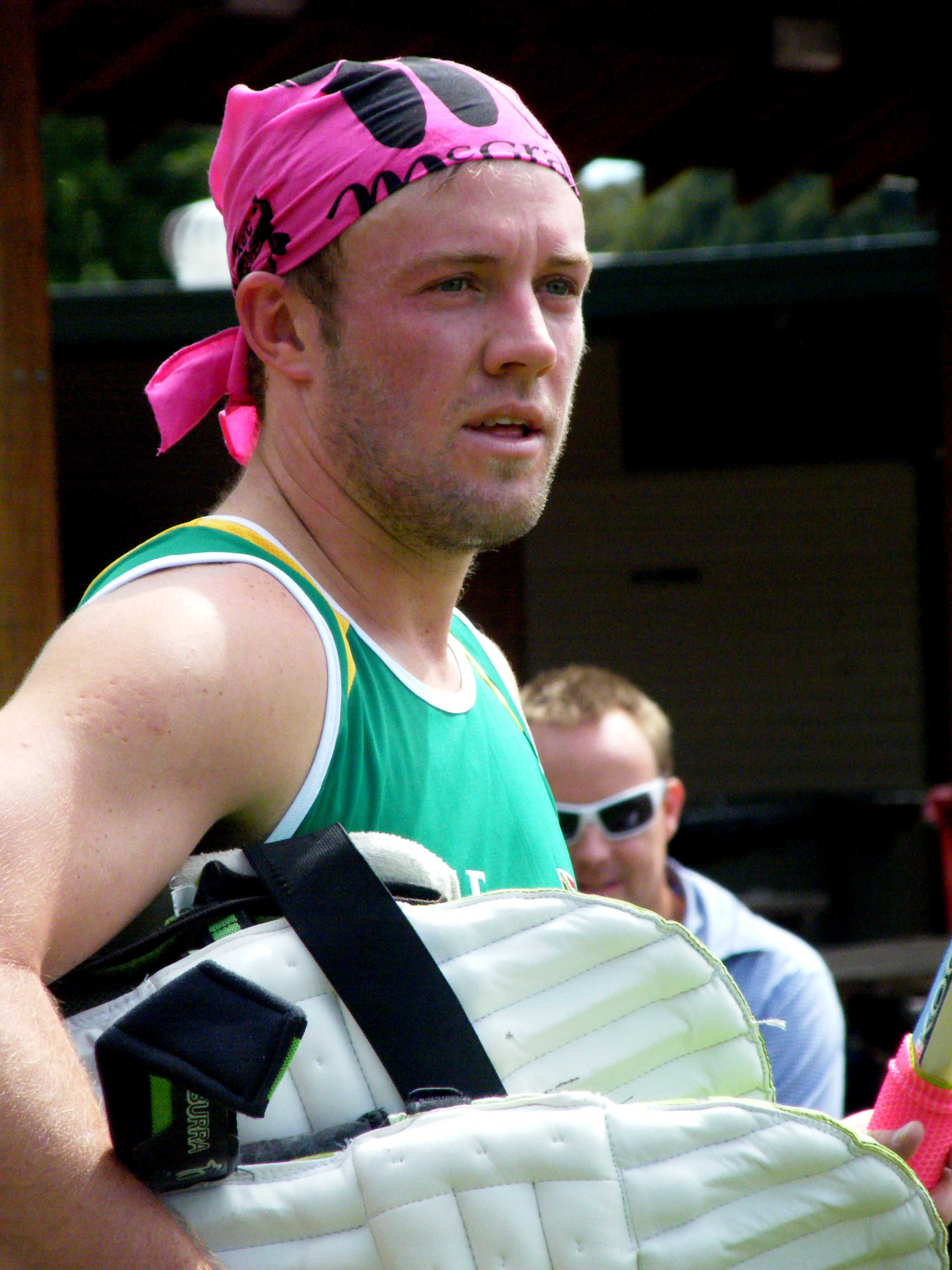
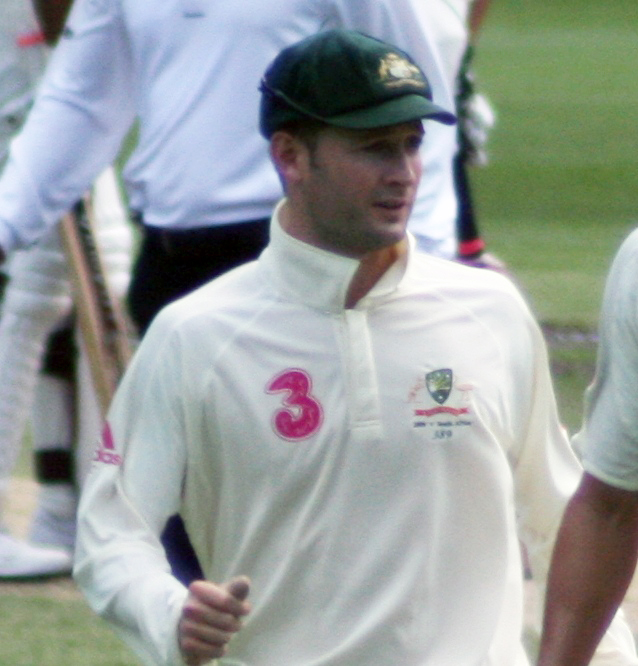
- Elton Chigumbura (Zim) • AB de Villiers (RSA) • M. Clarke (Aus) Captains of the teams participating in the series
- Date: 25 August 2014 – 6 September 2014
- Location: Zimbabwe
- Result: South Africa won the series
- Player of the series: (South Africa) Faf du Plessis
Teams
Zimbabwe	South Africa	Australia
Captains
Elton Chigumbura	AB de Villiers	Michael Clarke
Most runs
Hamilton Masakadza (180)	Faf du Plessis (464)	Aaron Finch (250)
Most wickets
Prosper Utseya (7)	Dale Steyn (10)	Nathan Lyon (7)

The 2014 Zimbabwe Tri-Series was a One Day International cricket tournament held in August and September in Zimbabwe. It was a tri-nation series featuring Zimbabwe, South Africa and Australia. South Africa won the series after defeating Australia in the final.

== Squads ==
Zimbabwe	South Africa	Australia
Elton Chigumbura (c); Tendai Chatara; Luke Jongwe; Tafadzwa Kamungozi; Neville Madziva; Timycen Maruma; Hamilton Masakadza; Shingi Masakadza; Tino Mawoyo; Natsai M'shangwe; Cuthbert Musoko; Richmond Mutumbami; John Nyumbu; Tinashe Panyangara; Vusi Sibanda; Sikandar Raza; Brendan Taylor; Donald Tiripano; Prosper Utseya; Brian Vitori; Malcolm Waller; Sean Williams	AB de Villiers (c); Hashim Amla (vc); Kyle Abbott; Quinton de Kock (wk); JP Duminy; Faf du Plessis; Imran Tahir; Ryan McLaren; David Miller; Morne Morkel; Wayne Parnell; Aaron Phangiso; Rilee Rossouw; Mthokozisi Shezi; Dale Steyn	Michael Clarke (c); George Bailey (vc); Ben Cutting; James Faulkner; Aaron Finch; Brad Haddin (wk); Phillip Hughes; Mitchell Johnson; Nathan Lyon; Mitchell Marsh; Glenn Maxwell; Kane Richardson; Steve Smith; Mitchell Starc; Shane Watson

== Group stage points table ==
Pos	Team	Pld	W	L	T	NR	BP	Pts	NRR
1	South Africa	4	3	1	0	0	2	14	0.404
2	Australia	4	2	2	0	0	2	10	1.160
3	Zimbabwe	4	1	3	0	0	0	4	−1.563

Points System:

In the event of teams finishing on equal points, the right to play in the final match or series was determined as follows:

- The team with the highest number of wins
- If still equal, the team with the highest number of wins over the other team(s) who are equal on points and have the same number of wins
- If still equal, the team with the highest number of bonus points
- If still equal, the team with the highest net run rate

In a match declared as no result, run rate is not applicable.

Won (W): 2
Lost (L): 0
No Result (NR): 1
Tie (T): 1

- Net run rate (NRR): Runs per over scored less runs per over conceded, adjusting team batting first to overs of team batting second in rain rule matches, adjusting to team's full allocation if all out, and ignoring no result matches.

== Group stage matches ==
=== 1st match ===
25 August
Scorecard

Australia; 350/6 (50 overs)	v	Zimbabwe; 152 (29.3 overs)
Glenn Maxwell 93 (46); Tendai Chatara 2/77 (9 overs)		Hamilton Masakadza 70 (91); Steve Smith 3/16 (4.3 overs)

Australia won by 198 runs
Harare Sports Club, Harare
Umpires: Ian Gould (Eng) and Russell Tiffin (Zim)
Player of the match: Mitchell Marsh (Aus)

- Zimbabwe won the toss and elected to field.
- Points: Australia 5, Zimbabwe 0

=== 2nd match ===
27 August
Scorecard

Australia; 327/7 (50 overs)	v	South Africa; 328/3 (46.4 overs)
Aaron Finch 102 (116); Imran Tahir 2/45 (10 overs)		AB de Villiers 136* (106); Mitchell Starc 2/62 (8 overs)

South Africa won by 7 wickets
Harare Sports Club, Harare
Umpires: Ian Gould (Eng) and Russell Tiffin (Zim)
Player of the match: AB de Villiers (RSA)

- South Africa won the toss and elected to field.
- Points: South Africa 4, Australia 0

=== 3rd match ===
29 August
Scorecard

South Africa; 231 (49.5 overs)	v	Zimbabwe; 170 (38.3 overs)
Quinton de Kock 76 (76); Prosper Utseya 5/36 (10 overs)		Sean Williams 46 (57); Ryan McLaren 3/24 (7 overs)

South Africa won by 61 runs
Harare Sports Club, Harare
Umpires: Ian Gould (Eng) and Jeremiah Matibiri (Zim)
Player of the match: Prosper Utseya (Zim)

- Zimbabwe won the toss and elected to field.
- Points: South Africa 5 Zimbabwe 0
- Prosper Utseya (Zim) took a hat-trick.

=== 4th match ===
31 August 2014
Scorecard

Australia; 209/9 (50 overs)	v	Zimbabwe; 211/7 (48 overs)
Michael Clarke 68* (102); Sean Williams 2/21 (10 overs)		Elton Chigumbura 52* (68); Nathan Lyon 4/44 (10 overs)

Zimbabwe won by 3 wickets
Harare Sports Club, Harare
Umpires: Owen Chirombe (ZIM) and Aleem Dar (Pak)
Player of the match: Elton Chigumbura (Zim)

- Australia won toss and elected to bat.
- Points: Zimbabwe 4, Australia 0
- Zimbabwe's victory over Australia was their first ODI win against them in 31 years.
- With this defeat, Australia lost their ICC ODI Championship number-one ranking to India.

=== 5th match ===
2 September
Scorecard

Australia; 282/7 (50 overs)	v	South Africa; 220 (44 overs)
Mitchell Marsh 82* (51); Aaron Phangiso 2/39 (10 overs)		Faf du Plessis 126 (109); Glenn Maxwell 2/22 (4 overs)

Australia won by 62 runs
Harare Sports Club, Harare
Umpires: Aleem Dar (Pak) and Russell Tiffin (Zim)
Player of the match: Mitchell Marsh (Aus)

- South Africa won the toss and elected to field.
- Points: Australia 5 South Africa 0

=== 6th match ===
4 September
Scorecard

South Africa; 271/6 (50 overs)	v	Zimbabwe; 208 (47.2 overs)
Faf du Plessis 121 (140); Neville Madziva 2/53 (6 overs)		Brendan Taylor 79 (96); JP Duminy 3/35 (8.2 overs)

South Africa won by 63 runs
Harare Sports Club, Harare
Umpires: Aleem Dar (Pak) and Jeremiah Matibiri (Zim)
Player of the match: Faf du Plessis (SA)

- Zimbabwe won the toss and elected to field.
- Points South Africa 5 Zimbabwe 0

== Final ==
6 September
Scorecard

Australia; 217/9 (50 overs)	v	South Africa; 221/4 (40.5 overs)
Aaron Finch 54 (87); Dale Steyn 4/34 (10 overs)		Faf du Plessis 96 (99); Steve Smith 1/9 (2 overs)

South Africa won by 6 wickets
Harare Sports Club, Harare
Umpires: Aleem Dar (Pak) and Russell Tiffin (Zim)
Player of the match: Dale Steyn (SA)

- South Africa won the toss and elected to field.
- South Africa won the tri-series

== Statistics ==
=== Most Runs ===
The top five run scorers (total runs) are included in this table.

Player	Team	Runs	Inns	Avg	S/R	HS	100s	50s
Faf du Plessis	South Africa	464	5	92.80	92.51	126	3	1
Aaron Finch	Australia	250	5	50.00	75.75	102	1	2
Mitchell Marsh	Australia	250	5	55.50	96.51	89	0	2
AB de Villiers	South Africa	215	5	107.50	116.84	126*	1	1
Hashim Amla	South Africa	172	5	34.40	73.50	66	0	2

=== Most Wickets ===
The top five wicket takers (total wickets) are listed in this table.

Player	Team	Wkts	Mts	Ave	S/R	Econ	BBI
Dale Steyn	South Africa	10	5	21.20	27.3	4.65	4/34
Nathan Lyon	Australia	7	4	25.71	31.7	4.86	4/44
Prosper Utseya	Zimbabwe	7	4	25.71	34.2	4.50	5/36
Ryan McLaren	South Africa	6	4	24.00	24.0	6.00	3/24
John Nyumbu	Zimbabwe	6	4	31.50	36.0	5.25	3/24
