= Barinder Sran =

Indian cricketer (born 1992)

Personal information
- Full name: Barinder Balbirsingh Sran
- Born: 10 December 1992 (age 33); Sirsa, Haryana, India
- Nickname: Barry
- Height: 6 ft 3 in (1.91 m)
- Batting: Left-handed
- Bowling: Left-arm fast-medium
- Role: Bowler

International information
- National side: India (2016)
- ODI debut (cap 207): 12 January 2016 v Australia
- Last ODI: 15 June 2016 v Zimbabwe
- ODI shirt no.: 51
- T20I debut (cap 66): 20 June 2016 v Zimbabwe
- Last T20I: 22 June 2016 v Zimbabwe

Domestic team information
- Years: Team
- 2011–2021: Punjab
- 2015: Rajasthan Royals
- 2016–2017: Sunrisers Hyderabad
- 2018: Kings XI Punjab
- 2019: Mumbai Indians
- 2019: Chandigarh

Career statistics
Competition	ODI	T20I	FC	LA
Matches	6	2	18	31
Runs scored	–	–	227	147
Batting average	–	–	17.46	16.33
100s/50s	–	–	0/0	0/0
Top score	–	–	33	38
Balls bowled	302	48	2,999	1,436
Wickets	7	6	47	45
Bowling average	38.42	6.83	37.87	32.64
5 wickets in innings	0	0	2	0
10 wickets in match	0	0	0	0
Best bowling	3/56	4/10	6/61	4/22
Catches/stumpings	1/–	0/–	2/–	5/–
- Source: ESPNcricinfo, 30 August 2024

Barinder Sran (born 10 December 1992) is a former Indian international cricketer. He is a left-arm medium-fast bowler who played for Punjab and Chandigarh in domestic cricket. He was a member of the Rajasthan Royals squad in the 2015 Indian Premier League. His last appearance in the IPL was in 2019 where he was picked by Mumbai Indians. He made his One Day International debut for India against Australia on 12 January 2016. He made his Twenty20 International (T20I) debut against Zimbabwe at Harare Sports Club on 20 June 2016 and took 4/10, which are the best bowling figures by an Indian debutant in T20I cricket. On 29 August 2024, Sran announced his retirement from international and domestic cricket.

== Domestic career ==
After switching from boxing to cricket at the age of 17, Sran attended trials for Kings XI Punjab but was not selected. He received cricket training at an academy in Chandigarh, and then took part in the Gatorade Speedster, winning the North India leg. He won the Under-19 leg of Speedster, following which he was sent to Dubai to train at the ICC academy.

He made his debut for Punjab in 2011–12, taking part in T20s and Ranji Trophy. Injuries kept him out of action for a few seasons. In 2014, he attended trials conducted by Mumbai Indians and Rajasthan Royals and was bought by the latter at the 2015 IPL players auction. He played only one match for the Royals that year.

In a Ranji Trophy match in 2015, he took 6/61 and helped his team Punjab win by innings margin against Railways.

In January 2018, he was bought by the Kings XI Punjab in the 2018 IPL auction. In December 2018, he was bought by the Mumbai Indians in the player auction for the 2019 Indian Premier League. He was released by the Mumbai Indians ahead of the 2020 IPL auction.

== International career ==
Having played only eight List A matches, Sran was picked in the Indian ODI squad for the Australian tour in January 2016. He made his debut in the first ODI at Perth and took 3 for 56, dismissing Aaron Finch, David Warner and Steve Smith. He was then picked in the Indian ODI and T20 squad for the Indian cricket team's tour to Zimbabwe.
