= Cheteshwar Pujara =

Indian cricketer (born 1988)

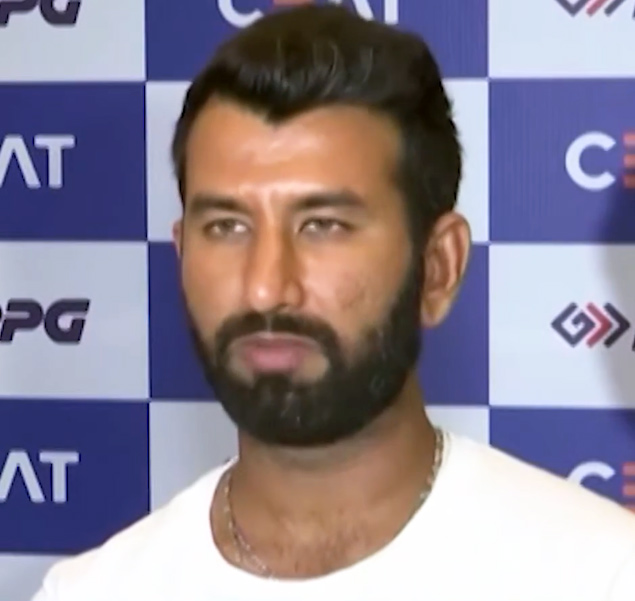
- Pujara in 2019

Personal information
- Full name: Cheteshwar Arvind Pujara
- Born: 25 January 1988 (age 38); Rajkot, Gujarat, India
- Batting: Right-handed
- Bowling: Right arm leg break
- Role: Top-order batter
- Relatives: Arvind Pujara (father), Bipin Pujara (uncle)

International information
- National side: India (2010–2023)
- Test debut (cap 266): 9 October 2010 v Australia
- Last Test: 7 June 2023 v Australia
- ODI debut (cap 198): 1 August 2013 v Zimbabwe
- Last ODI: 19 June 2014 v Bangladesh
- ODI shirt no.: 16

Domestic team information
- Years: Team
- 2005–2025: Saurashtra
- 2010: Kolkata Knight Riders
- 2011–2013: Royal Challengers Bangalore
- 2014: Kings XI Punjab
- 2014: Derbyshire
- 2015: Yorkshire
- 2017: Nottinghamshire
- 2018: Yorkshire
- 2021: Chennai Super Kings
- 2022–2024: Sussex

Career statistics
Competition	Test	ODI	FC	LA
Matches	103	5	278	130
Runs scored	7,195	51	21,301	5,759
Batting average	43.60	10.20	51.82	57.01
100s/50s	19/35	0/0	66/81	16/34
Top score	206*	27	352	174
Balls bowled	12	–	263	6
Wickets	0	–	6	0
Bowling average	–	–	27.66	–
5 wickets in innings	–	–	0	–
10 wickets in match	–	–	0	–
Best bowling	–	–	2/4	–
Catches/stumpings	66/–	0/–	160/0	47/–
Medal record
Men's Cricket
Representing India
ICC World Test Championship
Runner-up	2019–2021
Runner-up	2021–2023
ICC Under-19 Cricket World Cup
Runner-up	2006 Sri Lanka
- Source: CricketArchive, 25 March 2025

Cheteshwar Arvind Pujara (born 25 January 1988) is a former Indian cricketer who represented the Indian national team for over thirteen years. Pujara played for Saurashtra in Indian domestic cricket and for Sussex Cricket club in English County Championship. A specialist in first-class cricket throughout his career, Pujara was known for his disciplined and patient batting style which made him an integral part of the Indian Test team for over a decade. He played in over 100 Test matches for India.

Pujara made his first-class debut for Saurashtra in December 2005 and made his Test debut at Bangalore in October 2010. He also played 5 ODI matches for India.

He was a part of the India A team which toured England in the 2010 summer and was the highest scorer of the tour. In October 2011, the BCCI awarded him a D grade national contract. Known to have a sound technique and the temperament required to play long innings, he was one of the contenders for a spot in the Indian middle order after the retirement of Rahul Dravid and VVS Laxman. and was a part of the IPL 2021 winning team Chennai Super Kings.

His Test comeback came against New Zealand in August 2012, scoring a century. He made his first double hundred against England at Ahmedabad in November 2012 and followed up with another double hundred against Australia in March 2013, both the times steering India to victory and becoming man of the match.

In the 2012 NKP Salve Challenger Trophy, he was the highest scorer with two centuries and one half-century. He became one of the fastest batsmen to reach 1000 runs in Test cricket in just 11 matches and his 18th Test Innings. He won the Emerging Cricketer of the Year 2013.

In February 2017, during the one-off Test match against Bangladesh, he set a new record for the most runs by a batsman in an Indian first-class season, with 1,605 runs. The previous record was 1,604 runs set by Chandu Borde in 1964–65. In November 2017, he scored his twelfth double-century in first-class cricket, the most by an Indian batsman, breaking the previous record set by Vijay Merchant.

He was awarded a Grade B contract by the BCCI in March 2022. However, following a string of poor performances Pujara was dropped from the Indian National Team after a poor showing at the World Test Championship Final in 2023.

In June 2025 Pujara joined the BBC Test Match Special commentary team as a colour commentator/analyst for the first test of the series between England and India at Headingley.

Cheteshwar Pujara announced his retirement from all forms of cricket on 24 August 2025.

== Early and personal life ==
Cheteshwar Pujara was born in Rajkot, Gujarat on 25 January 1988 in a Hindu family. His father Arvind and his uncle Bipin were Ranji Trophy players for Saurashtra. His father and his mother, Reema Pujara, recognized his talents early and Cheteshwar practised with his father. He first started playing with the leather ball at the age of 13. His mother died in 2005 when he was 17 due to cancer. Cheteshwar Pujara completed his BBA from J. J. Kundalia College.

He married Puja Pabari in Rajkot on 13 February 2013. On 22 February 2018, the couple became parents of a baby girl, Aditi.

== Youth career ==
Pujara made his Under-19 Test debut for India against England in 2005. Opening the innings, he scored 211 runs to help India win by an innings and 137 runs. He was also picked in the Indian squad for the 2006 Under-19 Cricket World Cup. He was the leading run-scorer of the Under-19 World Cup where he scored 349 runs from 6 innings, including three fifties and a century, at an average of 117. He was the Man of the Tournament in the 2006 Under-19 Cricket World Cup.

He scored 97 runs against the West Indies in the quarterfinals before scoring 129 runs not out against England in the semifinals, helping India win by a huge margin of 234 runs. However, he was dismissed for a duck in the final, against Pakistan, which India eventually lost.

== Domestic career ==
He scored 10 and 203 not out from just 221 balls against Madhya Pradesh at the Saurashtra Cricket Association Stadium at Rajkot to ensure a 203-run victory which qualified Saurashtra for the 2012–13 Ranji Trophy quarter-finals. In his next match, the quarter-final at Saurashtra University in Rajkot against Karnataka, he scored 37 and 352 (dismissed by off spinner K. Gowtham in both innings) to ensure that Saurashtra progressed to the semifinal. Though he was called to the India ODI squad after this success, he was not selected in the first XI.

In 2013, at the age of only 25, Pujara became only the ninth batsman to score three career first-class triple-centuries. His scores were: 302* for Saurashtra against Orissa in 2008/09, 352 for Saurashtra against Karnataka in 2012/13, and 306* for India A against West Indies A in 2013/14. He also holds a record of scoring three triple centuries within a span of one month, although only the last of these was in a first-class match.

Pujara played for the Kolkata Knight Riders in the first three seasons of the IPL. In the 2011 players' auction, he was bought by the Royal Challengers Bangalore (RCB). He started for RCB for the fourth season of the IPL before injuring his knee in a match against Kochi Tuskers Kerala. The injury kept him out of action for nearly a year before he returned to domestic cricket at the end of 2011.

In the 2013–14 Ranji Trophy, he played a lone hand against Bengal at Eden Gardens in November as he scored 102, though his team was bowled out for a meagre 225 in response to Bengal's 303. In the next match against Tamil Nadu at Chennai, he scored a mammoth 269, and struck a 353-run partnership with Jaydev Shah (195) to post a score of 581/6 in response to Tamil Nadu's 565.

In 2014 IPL, Pujara began the season as Virender Sehwag's opening partner and was left out after the first six matches in which he made 125 runs at an average of just 25 at a strike rate of 100.80. After having not been picked by any franchise for the 2015 IPL season, he signed for Yorkshire.

Pujara was the leading run-scorer for Saurashtra in the 2017–18 edition of the Ranji Trophy, making 437 runs in four matches. Joining the team for the quarter-final in the next edition, he helped his team chase down a target of 372 runs against Uttar Pradesh, the highest ever in Ranji Trophy history, making 67 not out in the fourth innings. In the semi-final, marked by a couple of umpiring errors that went his way, Pujara made an unbeaten 131 in the fourth innings, helping his team proceed to their third final in six years. In the opening round of the Syed Mushtaq Ali Trophy that season, he scored his maiden T20 century and became the first batsman for Saurashtra to score a century in a T20 match.

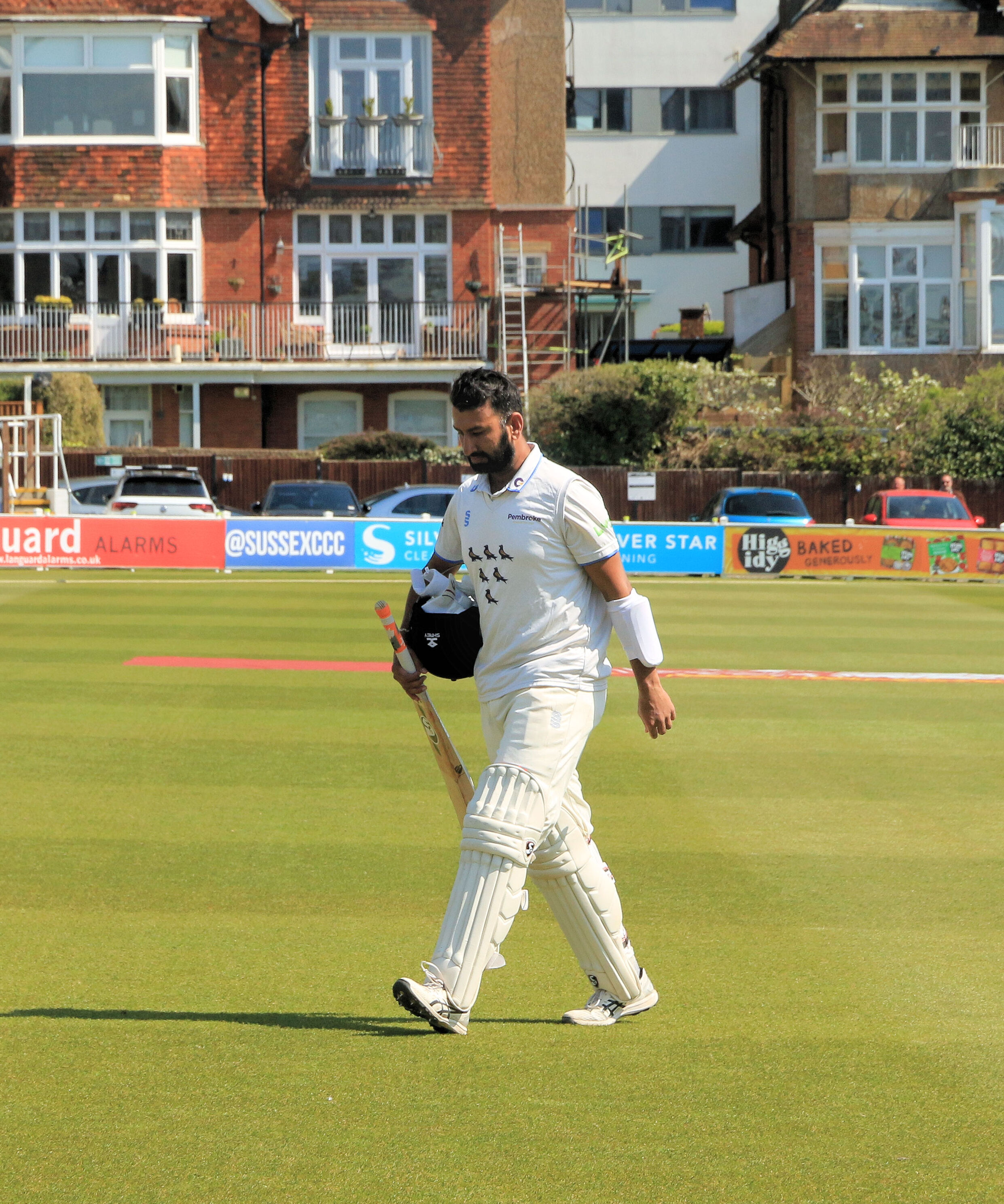
Pujara playing for Sussex in 2023.

In January 2020, in the 2019–20 Ranji Trophy, Pujara scored his 50th century in first-class cricket.

In February 2021, Pujara was bought by the Chennai Super Kings for 50 lakhs in the IPL auction ahead of the 2021 Indian Premier League. He however did not get a chance to play in any match.

In April 2022, in the 2022 County Championship in England, Pujara and Tom Haines became the first batters to score double centuries in the same innings of a first-class match while following-on.

In July 2022, Pujara scored a century in his first game as Sussex captain against Middlesex in the 2022 County Championship in England. This was his fifth century in this county season.

== International career ==
=== Test debut ===
Pujara was selected for the Indian squad for the 2 match home Test series against Australia in 2010, replacing Yuvraj Singh. He made his debut in the second Test of the series on 9 October 2010 at Bangalore after both Gautam Gambhir and VVS Laxman were down with injuries sustained in the First Test.

While Laxman was off the field injured in the First Test, Pujara took two catches at silly point as a substitute. In his first Test innings, Pujara scored four runs before getting out LBW to Mitchell Johnson on the third ball he faced.

In the second innings, Pujara was sent in at number three in place of Rahul Dravid in a tactical change by captain MS Dhoni. With India needing 207 runs to win, he made 72 before being bowled by an arm ball from Nathan Hauritz.

=== Breakthrough ===
In August 2012, he made a comeback into the team and made his first International Test century, 159 against New Zealand at Hyderabad.

He was selected in India's squad to play four test matches against England. In the first match at Sardar Patel Stadium, Ahmedabad he made an unbeaten 206 runs and helped his team to win the match and go 1–0 up in the series. He was also named man of the match for his inning. He continued his good form when he made another hundred in the second match at Wankhede Stadium, Mumbai. He not only made big scores in next two matches but end the series as second highest run scorer behind England captain Alastair Cook with 438 runs.

He became the 2nd fastest Indian to get to 1,000 Test runs, during the course of his double hundred against Australia in March 2013, at Hyderabad, where he put on a 370-run record 2nd wicket partnership with Murali Vijay. Only Vinod Kambli was faster.

Pujara is also the 12th fastest of all time. In terms of the number of tests (11 matches), he joined the legendary Sunil Gavaskar for the quickest Indian to reach the mark. Pujara had a brilliant test series against Australia scoring 419 runs, only second to Murali Vijay's 430 in which he slammed a double ton's 204 and two half-centuries (52 and 82).

As Indian opener Virender Sehwag was struggling out of form, it provided the opportunity for Pujara who hit double and triple tons in successive Ranji trophy matches to prove his ability in shorter versions of the game, as he was selected in the 15 member squad for the ODI series against England, but was injured in practice. Following injury, he made his debut against Zimbabwe, scoring 9 runs.

=== Cementing his place ===
On India's tour to South Africa in 2013, he emerged as the highest run-scorer in the Test series, scoring 280 runs at an average of 70.00.

Pujara was picked for the Indian squad for the 2014 Asia Cup that was held in Bangladesh. Pujara played in the three-match ODI series against Bangladesh in June 2014 and made 0, 11 & 27 respectively.

=== Struggle with form ===
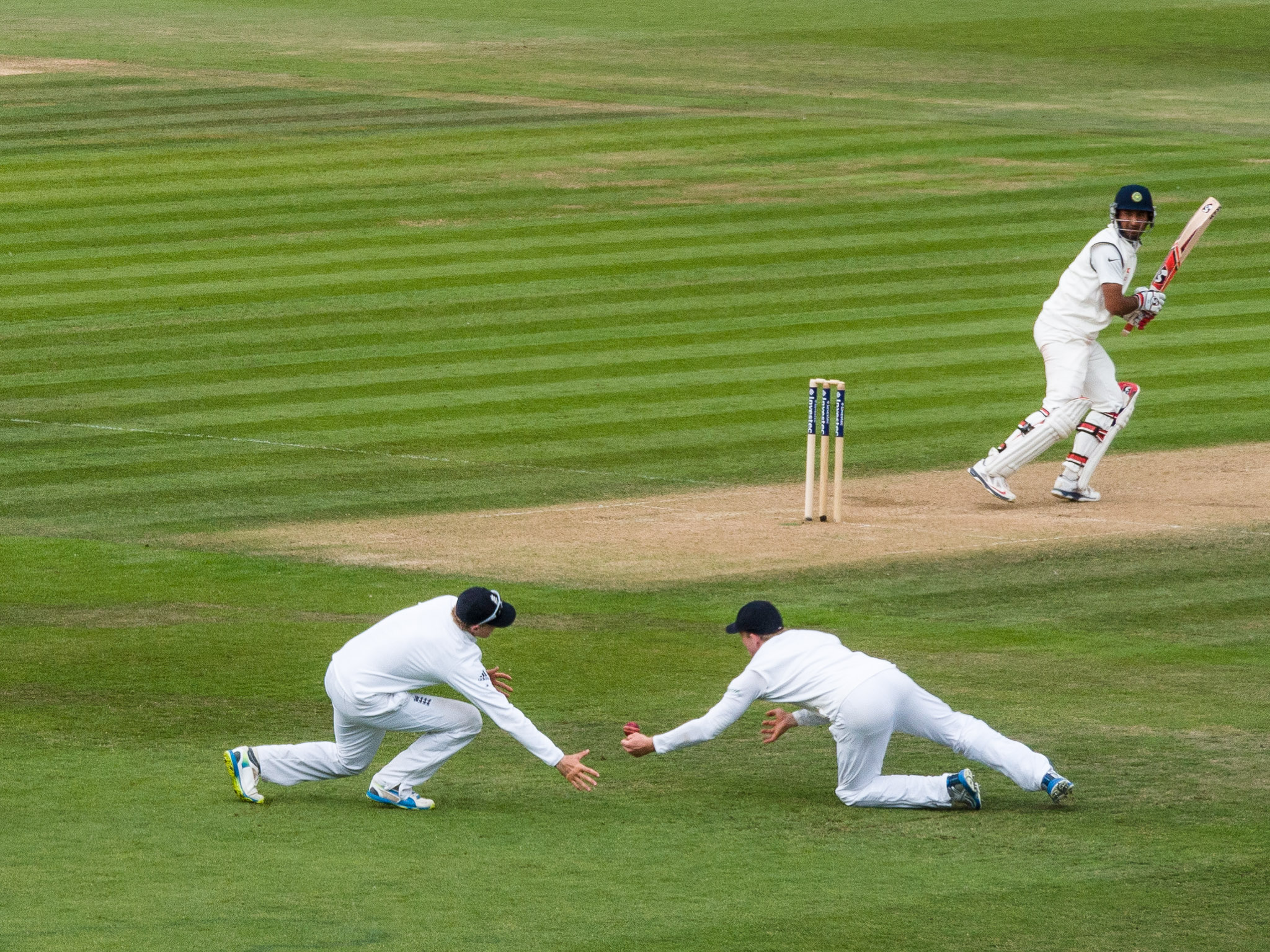
Pujara (top-right) during the third Test in Southampton (2014).

Pujara was named in the 16-man squad for the 2014 tour of England. With a best of 55 and a total of 222 runs in five Tests, he had a disappointing series. Despite getting good starts, he failed to convert them into big scores, struggling with his back foot movement and playing with a straighter bat, while also facing difficulty against the seaming ball. He was not a part of the squad for the ODI series that followed and upon receiving permission from the BCCI, signed for Derbyshire to play in their last three games of the season. After a poor first game, he finished the stint scoring 212 runs, that included an unbeaten 90 in the win over Surrey and an unbeaten century against Leicestershire.

He returned to form during the three-match test series against Sri Lanka in August 2015. He scored 145 not out in the third test against them. He also played in 2014 Border Gavaskar Trophy. In the first match at Adelaide Oval he made 73 runs in the first inning before being bowled by a Nathan Lyon delivery.

=== Return to form ===
Pujara continued to work on his game however he remained in the reckoning for a national comeback. He made the most of an injury setback to Murali Vijay in the 2015 series in Sri Lanka, reminding the selectors of his mettle by carrying his bat through his epic unbeaten 145 on an uncharacteristically seaming wicket at the SSC, Colombo, paving the way for an Indian win in the decider. Pujara has raised the bar even further since then, hammering routine hundreds during India's long home season and the odd series in Sri Lanka and the West Indies. In the first Test of Australia's 2016–17 tour of India in Pune, Pujara was dismissed for 6 and 31 in the two innings, with India losing the match cheaply. He played a key role in India's second inning of second Test scoring a crucial 92 in Bangalore, and helped the team win the game. In the third Test, played in Ranchi, Pujara scored 202, his third double-hundred, off 525 balls, in the first innings. In terms of balls faced, it was the longest inning by an Indian batsman. The 11-hour knock included a 199-run partnership with Wriddhiman Saha for the seventh wicket. Following a fightback by Australia in the second innings, the match ended in a draw and Pujara was named man of the match. With the knock, Pujara became the first Indian to score 2,000 runs in an Indian single first-class cricket season. In the ICC Batsman Rankings announced following the game, Pujara was ranked a career-best second. He finished the season with 1,316 runs in Tests, the second most in a single season after Australia's Ricky Ponting (1,483). He also broke the record for the most runs scored in a first-class season by an Indian. At the end of the season, he was placed fourth in the Batsman Rankings for Tests.

In May, ahead of the first Test of the 2017 season, he signed for Nottinghamshire on a four-match contract as a replacement to James Pattinson, to play in Division Two of the County season. He scored a hundred in his first game, against Gloucestershire, scoring 112 and adding 185 runs for the fourth wicket. The stint ended with 233 runs in a total of five innings. Carrying the good form, he scored his 12th Test century in the first Test of the tour of Sri Lanka at Galle in July. Striking a partnership with Shikhar Dhawan who made 190, Pujara scored 153 off 265 balls, helping India record its biggest away Test win. He scored another hundred in the second match, his 50th Test, a first innings knock of 133. On course of the innings, he went past 4,000 runs, becoming the second fastest Indian to get there in terms of number of innings batted.

Pujara was dropped from the team for the First Test of the 2018 England tour. Recalled to the team, he found form and made 72 in the second innings of the Third Test at Trent Bridge. The innings, and guided by Virat Kohli's 97 and 103, helped his team secure a 203-run victory, after successive defeats at Lord's and Birmingham. In the Fourth Test at Southampton, Pujara scored his 15th Test century, and only his second outside Asia since 2013. He made an unbeaten 132 off 257 deliveries, while adding 78 runs for the final two wickets, helping his team gain a 27-run lead over England's first innings total. However, India went on to lose the game and the next, finishing 1–4 in the series. He finished the series scoring 278 runs at 39.71. When the West Indies toured India later that year, he made a total of 96 runs at 48.00 in two innings.

I have never seen a batsman watch the ball as closely as he (Pujara) does, and that includes Sachin Tendulkar and Rahul Dravid. His concentration was a challenge. And we have to keep getting better just like him, all our batsmen and bowlers

— Former Australian opener and current coach Justin Langer, January 2019

Pujara carried his good form to Australia later that season and scored his maiden century in the country on the opening day of the First Test at Adelaide, becoming only the seventh Indian to do so on the first day of a Test series outside Asia. Rescuing his team from 41/4, he made 123 in a six-hour long innings, before being run out for the fourth time in 2018, equaling Bill Lawry of Australia's 54-year-old record for most times dismissed in that manner in a year. En route to his century, Pujara reached 5,000 runs in Tests, becoming the fifth fastest Indian to reach the milestone in terms of innings batted (108). He followed it up with a 71 in the second innings and helped India win the Test, their first in the country in ten years. Pujara was named man of the match. In the Third Test in Melbourne, he scored a 319-ball 106 while adding 170 runs for the third wicket with Kohli in the first innings. India went to win the game and secured an unassailable 2–1 lead in the series. He followed it up with a third century of the series in the final Test at Sydney, making 193 in the first innings off 373 balls, in another man-of-the-match winning performance. The match ended in a draw and the series at 2–1 in his team's favour meant it was their first Test series win on Australian soil. Pujara finished the series making 521 runs, the highest for either teams, from a total of 1,258 deliveries faced, a record for an India player there, and at an average of 74.42. He was named player of the series.

His next big series was the tour against Australia in December 2020 in which he scored 271 runs in 4 matches at an average of 33.87. As he played at a strike-rate of 29.20, his intent was under heavy scrutiny. On 19 January 2021, during the fourth Test match against Australia on The Gabba, Pujara scored his slowest Test half century ever. He reached his half century on the 196th ball that he faced, and passed his old record of a 174 ball half century against Australia in 2020.

On 16 December 2022, Pujara scored a century in Test cricket after 1443 days in the second innings of the first Test against Bangladesh, and scored unbeaten on 102 runs.

On 24 August 2025, Pujara announced his retirement from all forms of cricket.

== Records ==
- Pujara passed 2,000 runs in a calendar year during 2013. He scored 2,163 runs at 94.04 in first-class matches, only Chris Rogers with 2,568 runs at 50.35 made more.
- His 222-run partnership with Virat Kohli is India's joint-highest in South Africa and their highest in the second innings of a Test in South Africa.
- Second fastest Indian player to reach 1,000 Test runs.
- Highest second innings score of 153 by any Indian batsmen in South Africa.
- Most balls faced by an Indian in a Test innings: 525.
- Pujara climbed to a career-best number 2 spot in the rankings for Test batsmen after his double century against Australia in March 2017.
- He is the third batsman for India, and ninth overall, to bat on all five days of a Test.
- He is the sixth Indian cricketer to score a century in a Tour outside Asia on the first day.
- He is the eleventh Indian cricketer to reach 6,000 Test Runs.
- He is the Fourth Indian to Score 20013 runs in 430 innings in First Class Cricket.

== International Centuries ==
Pujara scored 19 centuries representing India in international cricket – all in Test cricket. He scored his first test century against New Zealand at Hyderabad in the first match of New Zealand's tour of India in 2012, scoring 159.

No.	Score	Against	Pos.	Inn.	Test	Venue	H/A/N	Date	Result	Ref
1	159	New Zealand	3	1	1/2	Rajiv Gandhi International Stadium, Hyderabad	Home	23 August 2012	Won	
2	206*	England	3	1	1/4	Sardar Patel Stadium, Ahmedabad	Home	15 November 2012	Won	
3	135	England	3	1	2/4	Wankhede Stadium, Mumbai	Home	23 November 2012	Lost	
4	204	Australia	3	2	2/4	Rajiv Gandhi International Stadium, Hyderabad	Home	2 March 2013	Won	
5	113	West Indies	3	2	1/2	Wankhede Stadium, Mumbai	Home	14 November 2013	Won	
6	153	South Africa	3	3	1/2	Wanderers Stadium, Johannesburg	Away	18 December 2013	Draw	
7	145*	Sri Lanka	2	1	3/3	Sinhalese Sports Club Ground, Colombo	Away	28 August 2015	Won	
8	101*	New Zealand	3	3	3/3	Holkar Stadium, Indore	Home	8 October 2016	Won	
9	124	England	3	2	1/5	Saurashtra Cricket Association Stadium, Rajkot	Home	9 November 2016	Draw	
10	119	England	3	1	2/5	VDCA Cricket Stadium, Vishakhapatnam	Home	17 November 2016	Won	
11	202	Australia	3	2	3/4	JSCA International Stadium Complex, Ranchi	Home	16 March 2017	Draw	
12	153	Sri Lanka	3	1	1/3	Galle International Stadium, Galle	Away	26 July 2017	Won	
13	133	Sri Lanka	3	1	2/3	Sinhalese Sports Club Ground, Colombo	Away	3 August 2017	Won	
14	143	Sri Lanka	3	2	2/3	Vidarbha Cricket Association Stadium, Nagpur	Home	24 November 2017	Won	
15	132*	England	3	2	4/5	Rose Bowl, Southampton	Away	30 August 2018	Lost	
16	123	Australia	3	1	1/4	Adelaide Oval, Adelaide	Away	6 December 2018	Won	
17	106	Australia	3	1	3/4	Melbourne Cricket Ground, Melbourne	Away	26 December 2018	Won	
18	193	Australia	3	1	4/4	Sydney Cricket Ground, Sydney	Away	3 January 2019	Draw	
19	102*	Bangladesh	3	3	1/2	Zohur Ahmed Chowdhury Stadium, Chittagong	Away	14 December 2022	Won	
