= Kedar Jadhav =

Indian cricketer (born 1985)

Personal information
- Full name: Kedar Mahadev Jadhav
- Born: 26 March 1985 (age 41); Pune, Maharashtra, India
- Height: 5 ft 4 in (163 cm)
- Batting: Right-handed
- Bowling: Right-arm off-break
- Role: Batting-all rounder, occasional wicket-keeper

International information
- National side: India (2014–2020)
- ODI debut (cap 205): 16 November 2014 v Sri Lanka
- Last ODI: 8 February 2020 v New Zealand
- ODI shirt no.: 81
- T20I debut (cap 51): 17 July 2015 v Zimbabwe
- Last T20I: 10 October 2017 v Australia

Domestic team information
- Years: Team
- 2007–2024: Maharashtra
- 2010: Delhi Daredevils (squad no. 9)
- 2011: Kochi Tuskers Kerala (squad no. 45)
- 2013–2015: Delhi Daredevils (squad no. 18)
- 2016–2017; 2023: Royal Challengers Bangalore (squad no. 81)
- 2018–2020: Chennai Super Kings (squad no. 81)
- 2021: Sunrisers Hyderabad

Career statistics
Competition	ODI	T20I	FC	LA
Matches	73	9	87	186
Runs scored	1389	122	6,100	5,520
Batting average	42.09	20.33	48.03	45.61
100s/50s	2/6	0/1	17/23	10/33
Top score	120	58	327	141
Balls bowled	1187	0	293	1,704
Wickets	27	0	2	36
Bowling average	37.77	–	106.50	43.25
5 wickets in innings	0	0	0	0
10 wickets in match	0	0	0	0
Best bowling	3/23	–	1/9	3/23
Catches/stumpings	33/–	1/–	63/–	84/–
Medal record
Men's Cricket
Representing India
ICC Champions Trophy
Runner-up	2017 England and Wales
ACC Asia Cup
Winner	2018 United Arab Emirates
- Source: ESPNcricinfo, 8 February 2024
- Political party: BJP

Kedar Mahadev Jadhav (born 26 March 1985) is an Indian politician and former cricketer who played for the India national cricket team. He played for Maharashtra in domestic cricket. He was a right hand batter, who occasionally kept wickets and bowled right-arm-offspin.

In the Indian Premier League, he has played for a number of team: Chennai Super Kings, Sunrisers Hyderabad, Delhi Daredevils and Kochi Tuskers Kerala.

Jadhav made his One Day International (ODI) debut for India against Sri Lanka on 16 November 2014 and his T20I debut for India against Zimbabwe on 17 July 2015. He was ranked seventh in The Times of India's Top 20 Most Desirable Men of Maharashtra in 2017. During the 2018 Asia Cup Final, he had a contribution of 23 runs, staying till the end to help his national team win the trophy for the seventh time. In April 2025 he joined BJP

== Early life ==
Jadhav was born on 26 March 1985 in Pune into a middle-class family which originally hails from Jadhavwadi in Madha in Solapur district. He is the youngest of four children, having three sisters. His father Mahadev Jadhav was employed as a clerk with the Maharashtra State Electricity Board until his retirement in 2003.

Jadhav lives in the western Pune locality of Kothrud and started playing cricket at the PYC Hindu Gymkhana. He initially represented Rainbow Cricket Club in tennis ball cricket tournaments, before getting selected for the Maharashtra under-19 team in 2004.

== Domestic career ==
In 2012, Jadhav made his first triple century, scoring 327, the second-highest by a Maharashtra batsman in the Ranji Trophy, against Uttar Pradesh at Maharashtra Cricket Association Stadium in Pune. During the 2013–14 Ranji Trophy season, he scored 1,223 runs, including six centuries, the fourth-highest runs aggregate in the tournament's history. This helped Maharashtra make their first Ranji Trophy final since 1992/93. Jadhav also represented India A and West Zone cricket team.

In October 2019, Jadhav was named in India B's squad for the 2019–20 Deodhar Trophy.

== International career ==
Jadhav was named in the Indian squad for Bangladesh tour in June 2014 but did not get a game. He played his first international match in November 2014 against Sri Lanka in the fifth match of the Sri Lanks's tour of India at Ranchi, scoring 20 runs off 24 balls before he was out stumped.

Jadhav played in all three ODIs against Zimbabwe in July 2015. In the third match at Harare, he scored 105 not out off 87 balls, his maiden ODI hundred. During the tour, he also made his T20I debut.

In January 2017, Jadhav scored 120 off 76 balls and shared a 200 run partnership with captain Virat Kohli to help India to register a win against England on his home ground. In the third match of the same series, he scored 90 runs and almost guided India home in a pursuit of 320. He was dismissed in the second last ball of the innings, and although, India lost the match, Jadhav had by then firmly established his place in the middle order and was awarded the Player of the Series award, having scored 232 runs in the series. Jadhav went on to represent India in the Champions Trophy 2017 and has been an integral part of the Indian team since.

In April 2019, Jadhav was named in India's squad for the 2019 Cricket World Cup.

On 3 June 2024, he announced his retirement from all forms of cricket.

== Indian Premier League ==
Jadhav, who was initially in the Royal Challengers Bangalore (RCB) development squad, was signed by Delhi Daredevils in 2010. He made an immediate impact as he scored a 29-ball 50 for Delhi against RCB on his IPL debut. The following season, he was signed by new franchise Kochi Tuskers Kerala, for whom he played only six matches that year. In 2013, he was re-signed by Delhi but was not retained by Delhi in the 2014 IPL auction before being bought back by the team for ₹20 million scoring 149 runs in 10 innings in 2014 for Delhi.

Ahead of the 2016 IPL, Jadhav was traded to Royal Challengers Bangalore for an undisclosed amount. In 2018, he was picked by Chennai Super Kings but was ruled out of the tournament after tearing his hamstring in the opening match against Mumbai Indians. In February 2021, Jadhav was bought by the Sunrisers Hyderabad in the IPL auction ahead of the 2021 Indian Premier League for INR 2 crores. He went unsold in the 2022 IPL auctions.

== Business interests ==
In April 2024, Explosive Whey, a fitness and sports nutrition brand founded by Jadhav, Mandar Bhandari, and Rishikesh Hande joined hands with MS Dhoni. Dhoni will become an investor and brand ambassador for the protein supplement product.

== Political career ==
Kedar Jadhav is a member of the Rashtriya Swayamsevak Sangh (RSS), a Hindu nationalist paramilitary volunteer organisation.

Kedar Jadhav joined Bharatiya Janata Party in the presence of Maharashtra Minister and BJP chief Chandrashekhar Bawankule on 8 April 2025.
