= Myluahanan Senthilnathan =

Indian cricketer (born 1969)

Personal information
- Born: 9 March 1969 (age 57); Dharapuram, Tamil Nadu, India
- Batting: Right-handed
- Role: Batsman

Domestic team information
- Years: Team
- 1987/88–1993/94: Tamil Nadu
- 1995/96: Goa
- First-class debut: 8 January 1988 Tamil Nadu v Karnataka
- Last First-class: 31 January 1996 Goa v Andhra
- List A debut: 12 March 1989 Tamil Nadu v Delhi
- Last List A: 27 January 1996 Goa v Andhra

Career statistics
Competition	FC	List A
Matches	37	16
Runs scored	1615	394
Batting average	31.66	26.26
100s/50s	2/9	0/4
Top score	189	97
Balls bowled	90	14
Wickets	0	3
Bowling average	–	3.66
5 wickets in innings	0	0
10 wickets in match	0	n/a
Best bowling	0/11	3/10
Catches/stumpings	38/–	2/–
- Source: ESPNcricinfo, 11 December 2018

Myluahanan Senthilnathan, also spelt Mylvahanan Senthilnathan (born 9 March 1969) is a former Indian cricketer.

Senthilnathan captained the Indian under-19 cricket team in the 1980s. A right-handed batsman, he played first-class cricket for Tamil Nadu and Goa from 1988 to 1996. His highest score was 189 in Tamil Nadu's innings victory over Assam in a pre-quarter-final of the Ranji Trophy in 1992–93.

He is currently the chief coach of MRF Pace Foundation in Chennai.
