= New Zealand cricket team in India in 2012 =

International cricket tour

	India	New Zealand
- Dates: 23 August 2012 – 11 September 2012
Captains	Mahendra Singh Dhoni	Ross Taylor

Test series
- Result: India won the 2-match series 2–0
Most runs	Cheteshwar Pujara (216)	Ross Taylor (157)
Most wickets	Ravichandran Ashwin (18)	Tim Southee (8)
- Player of the series: Ravichandran Ashwin (Ind)

Twenty20 International series
- Results: New Zealand won the 2-match series 1–0
Most runs	Virat Kohli (70)	Brendon McCullum (91)
Most wickets	Irfan Pathan (3)	Kyle Mills (2); James Franklin (2)
- Player of the series: Brendon McCullum (NZ)

New Zealand played two Test matches and two Twenty20 Internationals (T20Is) in India as part of their preparations for the ICC World T20 in September in Sri Lanka. The series started with a Test match on 23 August 2012 and ended with a T20I on 11 September 2012.

== Test series ==
=== 1st Test ===
23–27 August
Scorecard

India	v	New Zealand
438 (134.3 overs); Cheteshwar Pujara 159 (306); Jeetan Patel 4/100 (41 overs)		159 (61.3 overs); James Franklin 43* (122); Ravichandran Ashwin 6/31 (16.3 overs)
		164 (79.5 overs, f/o); Kane Williamson 52 (163); Ravichandran Ashwin 6/54 (26.5 overs)

India won by an innings and 115 runs
Rajiv Gandhi International Cricket Stadium, Hyderabad
Umpires: Steve Davis (Aus) and Ian Gould (Eng)
Player of the match: Ravichandran Ashwin (IND)

- India won the toss and elected to bat.
- Cheteshwar Pujara scored his 1st century in Test

=== 2nd Test ===
31 August – 4 September
Scorecard

New Zealand	v	India
365 (90.1 Overs); Ross Taylor 113 (127); Pragyan Ojha 5/99 (28.1 overs)		353 (96.5 Overs); Virat Kohli 103 (193); Tim Southee 7/64 (24 overs)
248 (73.2 Overs); James Franklin 41 (90); Ravichandran Ashwin 5/69 (22 overs)		262/5 (63.2 Overs); Virat Kohli 51* (82); Jeetan Patel 3/68 (15.2 Overs)

India won by 5 wickets
M. Chinnaswamy Stadium, Bengaluru
Umpires: Steve Davis (Aus) and Ian Gould (Eng)
Player of the match: Virat Kohli (Ind)

- New Zealand won the toss and elected to bat.
- Tim Southee produces the third best bowling figures for New Zealand in Tests.

== T20I series ==
=== 1st T20I ===
8 September
19:00 (D/N)
Scorecard

India	v	New Zealand

Match abandoned due to rain
ACA-VDCA Stadium, Visakhapatnam

=== 2nd T20I ===
11 September
19:00 (D/N)
Scorecard

New Zealand; 167/5 (20 overs)	v	India; 166/4 (20 overs)
Brendon McCullum 91 (55); Irfan Pathan 3/31 (4 overs)		Virat Kohli 70 (41); Kyle Mills 2/17 (3 overs)

New Zealand won by 1 run
M. A. Chidambaram Stadium, Chennai
Umpires: Sundaram Ravi (Ind) and Vineet Kulkarni (Ind)
Player of the match: Brendon McCullum (NZ)

- India won the toss and chose to field.
- T20 International debut : Lakshmipathy Balaji (Ind)
