= Taurai Muzarabani =

Zimbabwean cricketer (born 1987)

Personal information
- Born: 27 March 1987 (age 39); Mashonaland, Zimbabwe
- Batting: Right-handed
- Bowling: Right-arm medium-fast
- Role: Bowler

International information
- National side: Zimbabwe
- ODI debut (cap 128): 13 October 2015 v Ireland
- Last ODI: 13 June 2016 v India
- ODI shirt no.: 37
- T20I debut (cap 40): 17 July 2015 v India
- Last T20I: 20 June 2016 v India
- T20I shirt no.: 37
- Source: Cricinfo, 17 July 2015

Taurai Muzarabani (born 27 March 1987) is a Zimbabwean cricketer. He made his Twenty20 International debut for Zimbabwe against India on 17 July 2015. He made his One Day International debut for Zimbabwe against Ireland on 13 October 2015. In July 2016 he was named in Zimbabwe's Test squad for their series against New Zealand, but he did not play.
