= Neville Madziva =

Zimbabwean cricketer (born 1991)

Personal information
- Full name: Neville Madziva
- Born: 2 August 1991 (age 35); Kadoma, Zimbabwe
- Batting: Right-handed
- Bowling: Right-arm medium-fast
- Role: All-rounder

International information
- National side: Zimbabwe
- ODI debut (cap 121): 17 August 2014 v South Africa
- Last ODI: 4 September 2014 v South Africa
- T20I debut (cap 39): 17 July 2015 v India
- Last T20I: 29 September 2019 v Singapore

Domestic team information
- Years: Team
- 2011–: Mid West Rhinos

Career statistics
Competition	ODI	FC	LA	T20
Matches	3	23	19	4
Runs scored	30	703	132	9
Batting average	10.00	31.95	16.50	4.50
100s/50s	0/0	0/3	0/0	0/0
Top score	25	70*	33*	8
Balls bowled	102	2,918	536	72
Wickets	3	56	13	4
Bowling average	53.57	22.58	41.63	21.50
5 wickets in innings	0	0	0	0
10 wickets in match	0	0	0	0
Best bowling	3.53	4/22	2/22	2/28
Catches/stumpings	1/-	17/-	2/–	0/–
- Source: Cricinfo, 29 September 2019

Neville Madziva (born 2 August 1991) is a Zimbabwean cricketer. An all-rounder, Madziva is a right-arm medium-fast bowler who can bat in the lower-order.

He was introduced to Zimbabwe cricket team when South Africa toured Zimbabwe in August 2014. He made his One Day International debut at Queens Sports Club in the first of a three-match series. He played one more match in the series in which he took the wicket of Wayne Parnell but failed with the bat.

He returned to the Zimbabwe team in the last match of Tri-Series where he took the wickets of Hashim Amla and JP Duminy. With the bat he scored three runs as Zimbabwe lost the match by 63 runs.

He made his Twenty20 International debut for Zimbabwe against India on 17 July 2015.

In September 2018, he was named in Zimbabwe's squad for the 2018 Africa T20 Cup tournament. In December 2020, he was selected to play for the Rhinos in the 2020–21 Logan Cup.
