= Manoj Joglekar =

Indian cricketer (born 1973)

Personal information
- Full name: Manoj Vijay Joglekar
- Born: 1 November 1973 (age 53); Bombay, Maharashtra, India
- Batting: Left-handed
- Bowling: Right arm off spin
- Role: Batsman

Domestic team information
- Years: Team
- 1992/93–2000/01: Bombay/Mumbai
- 2001/02–2002/03: Assam
- 2003/04: Mumbai
- 2005/06: Jharkhand
- 2007/08: Goa
- FC debut: 20 November 1992 Bombay v Baroda
- Last FC: 12 December 2007 Goa v Jammu and Kashmir
- LA debut: 6 January 1995 Bombay v Saurashtra
- Last LA: 9 February 2004 Mumbai v Bengal

Career statistics
Competition	First-class	List A
Matches	39	32
Runs scored	1718	810
Batting average	33.68	33.75
100s/50s	4/8	1/6
Top score	122	113
Balls bowled	222	258
Wickets	0	4
Bowling average	–	50.25
5 wickets in innings	–	0
10 wickets in match	–	0
Best bowling	–	1/14
Catches/stumpings	41/–	14/–
- Source: CricketArchive, 30 September 2008

Manoj Vijay Joglekar (born 1 November 1973), is an Indian cricketer. He is a left-handed batsman and a right-arm offbreak bowler. An opener, he faced competition in his early days from more famous Mumbai prodigies – Vinod Kambli and Sachin Tendulkar. Joglekar was made the captain of the U-19 team that hosted England in 1992/93 season. The series was drawn 1-1 though Joglekar played in the middle-order and did not have much success.

Manoj Joglekar made his debut in Ranji Trophy domestic cricket in the same season (1992/93) and was constantly fighting for a place in the squad. He never received an opportunity to play International Cricket and left Mumbai after the 2005/06 season, although he made several appearances for the Goa cricket team in 2007/08.
