= Anderson–Tendulkar Trophy =

Test cricket series between India and England

- Countries: England; India
- Administrator: ECB; BCCI
- Format: Test cricket
- First edition: 2025
- Latest edition: 2025 Anderson–Tendulkar Trophy
- Tournament format: Test match series
- Number of teams: 2
- Host: England; India
- Current trophy holder: England & India
- Most successful: England & India (1 shared)
- Most runs: Shubman Gill (754)
- Most wickets: Mohammed Siraj (23)
- TV: Sky Sports (England); Sony Pictures Networks (India); JioHotstar (India)

The Anderson–Tendulkar Trophy is awarded to the winner of each Test cricket series between England and India. The trophy was introduced in 2025 and is named in honour of England's James Anderson and India's Sachin Tendulkar to replace the previous Pataudi Trophy and Anthony de Mello Trophy. The first 5-match series ended in a closely fought 2–2 draw.

== History ==
The series forms part of the ICC Future Tours Programme, so the gap between tours varies depending on scheduling. To claim the Anderson–Tendulkar Trophy, a team must win the series; if the series is drawn, the side holding the trophy from the previous series retains it.

The Anderson–Tendulkar Trophy replaced both the Pataudi Trophy and the Anthony de Mello Trophy, which were awarded for series winners hosted in England and India respectively. To continue to honour the legacy of the Nawab of Pataudi and Mansoor Ali Khan Pataudi, two past Indian captains, the winning captain of the trophy is presented the Pataudi medal of excellence, an idea suggested by Sachin Tendulkar to BCCI and the ECB.

Shortly after the reveal, the former Indian batsman Sunil Gavaskar criticised the naming of the trophy, stating he believed that Tendulkar's name should have come first and encouraged Indian fans to deliberately misname it when mentioning it. This was despite the England and Wales Cricket Board (ECB) stating that the trophy was named solely on alphabetical order.

== Background ==
=== Test series and one-off encounters not under the trophy ===
The two teams first met when the British India cricket team toured England in the 1932 season for a one-off Test and 25 first-class matches, primarily against English domestic sides.

Years	Host	Tests	England	India	Drawn	Result
1932	England	1	1	0	0	England
1933–34	India	3	2	0	1	England
1936	England	3	2	0	1	England
1946	England	3	1	0	2	England
	Total	10	6	0	4	–

The first series after Indian independence was played in 1951–52 in India; shortly followed by India's tour of England in 1952. There have been regular Test series been the two nations ever since.

Years	Host	Tests	England	India	Drawn	Result	Trophy
1951–52	India	5	1	1	3	Drawn	Anthony de Mello Trophy
1952	England	4	3	0	1	England	–
1959	England	5	5	0	0	England	–
1961–62	India	5	0	2	3	India	Anthony de Mello Trophy
1963–64	India	5	0	0	5	Drawn	Anthony de Mello Trophy
1967	England	3	3	0	0	England	–
1971	England	3	0	1	2	India	–
1972–73	India	5	1	2	2	India	Anthony de Mello Trophy
1974	England	3	3	0	0	England	–
1976–77	India	5	3	1	1	England	Anthony de Mello Trophy
1979	England	4	1	0	3	England	–
1979–80	India	1	1	0	0	England	Golden Jubilee Test
1981–82	India	6	0	1	5	India	Anthony de Mello Trophy
1982	England	3	1	0	2	England	–
1984–85	India	5	2	1	2	England	Anthony de Mello Trophy
1986	England	3	0	2	1	India	–
1990	England	3	1	0	2	England	–
1992–93	India	3	0	3	0	India	Anthony de Mello Trophy
1996	England	3	1	0	2	England	–
2001–02	India	3	0	1	2	India	Anthony de Mello Trophy
2002	England	4	1	1	2	Drawn	–
2005–06	India	3	1	1	1	Drawn	Anthony de Mello Trophy
2007	England	3	0	1	2	India	Pataudi Trophy
2008–09	India	2	0	1	1	India	Anthony de Mello Trophy
2011	England	4	4	0	0	England	Pataudi Trophy
2012–13	India	4	2	1	1	England	Anthony de Mello Trophy
2014	England	5	3	1	1	England	Pataudi Trophy
2016–17	India	5	0	4	1	India	Anthony de Mello Trophy
2018	England	5	4	1	0	England	Pataudi Trophy
2020–21	India	4	1	3	0	India	Anthony de Mello Trophy
2021 (Note: The final test was played in 2022.)	England	5	2	2	1	Drawn	Pataudi Trophy
2023–24	India	5	1	4	0	India	Anthony de Mello Trophy
	Total	126	45	35	46	–	

== Series results ==
=== Anderson–Tendulkar Trophy results ===
Years	Host	Tests	England	India	Drawn	Result	Holder	Player(s) of the Series
2025	England	5	2	2	1	Drawn	Both	(England) Harry Brook (India) Shubman Gill

Total Series	England	India	Drawn
1	—N/a	—N/a	1

== Namesakes ==
James Anderson who played 188 Test matches for England, is the leading wicket-taker for his team, and also currently holds the record for the most wickets taken by a fast bowler in Test cricket (704 wickets). Sachin Tendulkar, who played 200 Test matches for India, is the current leading run-scorer for his team and in Test cricket (15,921 runs).

== Media coverage ==
Matches played in England: Sky Sports, Sony Pictures Networks, and JioHotStar.

== 2025 series ==
The 5-match series ended in a 2–2 draw between India and England. Shubhman Gill was the highest run scorer among batsmen with 754 runs. Mohammed Siraj was the highest wicket-taking bowler in the series with 23 wickets. For England, Joe Root scored the highest amount of runs with 537 runs, and Josh Tongue took 19 wickets. Harry Brook was the man of the series from the English side. Shubman Gill was the man of the series from the Indian side. India, who were trailing 2–1 in the series, fought back in the last test to level the series.

== See also ==
- India–Australia cricket rivalry
- Anthony de Mello Trophy
- Border–Gavaskar Trophy
- Gandhi–Mandela Trophy
- The Ashes
- ICC World Test Championship
