= Pataudi Trophy =

Defunct Test cricket series between India and England

- The Trophy
- Countries: England; India
- Administrator: ECB
- Format: Test cricket
- First edition: 2007
- Latest edition: 2021
- Tournament format: 5-match test series
- Number of teams: 2
- Host: England
- Current trophy holder: England
- Most successful: England (3 series wins & 1 retention)
- Qualification: ICC World Test Championship
- Most runs: (England) Joe Root (1,574)
- Most wickets: (England) James Anderson (105)
- TV: Sky Sports (England); Sony Pictures Networks (India)

The Pataudi Trophy was given to the winner of each Test cricket series between England and India for Test series played in England. (Note: When played in India, the teams played for Anthony de Mello Trophy.) The trophy was named after Iftikhar Ali Khan Pataudi, who played for both India and England. It was designed and made by Jocelyn Burton. The trophy was first awarded in 2007 to mark 75 years since the two teams played their first Test match in 1932. India won the first Pataudi Trophy series in England in 2007. A team had to win a series to hold the Pataudi Trophy; if the series ended in a draw, the team that already held the Trophy retained it.

The last series was played in 2021 which ended in a draw by 2–2, thus leading England to retain the trophy as they had won it previously in 2018. In 2025, the Pataudi Trophy was replaced by the Anderson–Tendulkar Trophy. A new Pataudi Medal of Excellence was announced to be awarded to the winning captain of the Anderson Tendulkar series.

== Background ==
The first Test series between England and India took place in 1932. Over the following decades, India toured England on fourteen occasions, with England winning eleven series, India winning two, and one series drawn.

In 2007, to commemorate the 75th anniversary of the inaugural series, the England and Wales Cricket Board formally introduced a cricket trophy, named after the Pataudi family.⁣

== Introduction of the trophy ==
In 2007, the Marylebone Cricket Club commissioned a new trophy to celebrate the 75th anniversary of India's first Test match in 1932. The trophy was designed and crafted by London silversmith Jocelyn Burton in her studio in Holborn. It was later displayed at Jocelyn's exhibition in November and December 2012 at Bentley & Skinner, London.

== Naming and renaming ==
The trophy was originally named in honour of Iftikhar Ali Khan Pataudi, who remains the only cricketer to have represented both India and England in Test matches – having made three appearances for each national team, and his son Mansoor Ali Khan Pataudi who captained India after from playing schools cricket in England.⁣ Mansoor Ali Khan Pataudi studied at Winchester College, one of the prestigious public schools in England and played for the school's cricket team. After Winchester, he went on to Balliol College, Oxford, where he played first-class cricket for Oxford University and also made appearances for Sussex County Cricket Club.

In 2025, a new trophy was created to jointly honour England's former fast bowler James Anderson, the leading wicket-taker among pace bowlers (with 704 wickets), and India's former batter Sachin Tendulkar, the highest run-scorer (15,921 runs) in Test cricket history. The renaming was criticized, including by late Mansur Ali Khan Pataudi's wife Sharmila Tagore , former cricketers Sunil Gavaskar and Kapil Dev. In order to help address the criticism against the renaming of the trophy and to continue to honour the legacy of Pataudis, the winning captain of the trophy would be presented the Pataudi medal, an idea by Sachin Tendulkar.

== Series results ==
Since 2007, five Test series have been played in England under the officially named trophy. England have won three of these series, India have won one, and one series ended in a draw.

== List of series ==
India–England Test series before Pataudi series (pre-2007)
Series	Years	Test matches	England	India	Drawn	Result
1	1932	1	1	0	0	England
2	1936	3	2	0	1	England
3	1946	3	1	0	2	England
4	1952	4	3	0	1	England
5	1959	5	5	0	0	England
6	1967	3	3	0	0	England
7	1971	3	0	1	2	India
8	1974	3	3	0	0	England
9	1979	4	1	0	3	England
10	1982	3	1	0	2	England
11	1986	3	0	2	1	India
12	1990	3	1	0	2	England
13	1996	3	1	0	2	England
14	2002	4	1	1	2	Drawn

Series	England	India	Drawn
14	11	2	1

India–England Test series played for the Pataudi Trophy
Series	Season	Tests	England	India	Drawn	Result	Holder	Player(s) of the series
1	2007	3	0	1	2	India	India	(England) James Anderson (India) Zaheer Khan
2	2011	4	4	0	0	England	England	(England) Stuart Broad (India) Rahul Dravid
3	2014	5	3	1	1	England	England	(England) James Anderson (India) Bhuvneshwar Kumar
4	2018	5	4	1	0	England	England	(England) Sam Curran (India) Virat Kohli
5	2021 (Note: The final test was played in 2022.)	5	2	2	1	Drawn	England	(England) Joe Root (India) Jasprit Bumrah
Total		22	13	5	4			

Series	England	India	Drawn
5	3	1	1

== See also ==
- Laws of cricket
- Cricket terminology
- Anderson–Tendulkar Trophy
- Border–Gavaskar Trophy
- Anthony de Mello Trophy
- Gandhi–Mandela Trophy
