= Jocelyn Burton =

British artist (1946–2020)

- Born: Sara Jocelyn Margarita Elissa Burton; 10 January 1946
- Died: 5 April 2020 (aged 74)
- Occupations: Silversmith, goldsmith, designer
- Parent(s): Monty Burton (father); Joan Evans (mother)
- Relatives: Alison Fairman (sister); Michael Burton (Brother)
- Website: jocelynburton.co.uk

Sara Jocelyn Margarita Elissa Burton (10 January 1946 – 5 April 2020) was a British silver and goldsmith. Burton was the first woman to receive the City and Guilds of London Institute top award, the Prince Philip Medal.

== Life and career ==
Jocelyn Burton was born in Wales in 1946 and was the daughter of RAF officer Roland (Monty) Burton. Although she intended to study modern languages at Cambridge, she developed an interest in art and applied to study silversmithing at Sir John Cass College in London in 1966, but was rejected for being female. Burton instead enrolled in a jewellery design program and studied silversmithing in evening courses. In 1971, after early successes and awards, Burton set up her own studio and workshop in London. Jocelyn died after a long battle with cancer, in Boston Lincolnshire on 5 April 2020, aged 74.

== Work ==
Burton's design process started with drawing, followed by painting, and finally to producing works with precious metals. Much of her early work features oceanic themes, such as seashells and seahorses. Jocelyn's work was varied, often of the Baroque style. Although known for jewellery, Jocelyn was an expert in the design of architectural lighting, table and flatware and many other objects created from precious metal.

Burton's commissions include a silver table fountain for the Fishmongers' Company, an 18 carat gold and sapphire chain for the Butchers' Company, an offertory salver for Lichfield Cathedral and a centerpiece commissioned by Sir Roy Strong to launch the permanently exhibited modern plate collection of the Victoria and Albert Museum. Other works include a set of silver wall sconces for a London financial institution and the Pataudi Trophy, a prize commissioned by the MCC to commemorate the 75th anniversary of India's Test debut, presented when the Indian cricket team toured England in 2007. The MCC loaned the trophy to be exhibited in November and December 2012 at Burton's Bentley & Skinner Exhibition. Burton's work features in private and public collections including, 10 Downing Street, York Minster, Longleat, St Paul's Cathedral and the Fitzwilliam Museum, Cambridge.

Beyond her major commissions, Burton has created a range of domestic silver as well as jewellery using gold, silver, precious and semi-precious stones. All this work is based on her own designs – from preliminary sketches to finished color drawings.

== Recognition and awards ==
In 1968, at the very beginning of her career, Burton won the De Beers International Award for the design of diamond jewellery.

In 1995, Burton won the United Kingdom Jeweller Award for best design in silver. Burton had the first piece of platinum to be hallmarked at the London Assay Office in 1973 when hallmarking for platinum was introduced under the Hallmarking Act of 1973 and platinum became a recognized metal under the Vienna Convention on the Control of the Fineness and the Hallmarking of Precious Metal Objects. This piece is at Goldsmiths' Hall. She became a freeman of the Worshipful Company of Goldsmiths in 1974.

In 2003, Burton was the first woman to receive the City and Guilds of London Institute top award, the Prince Philip Medal.

Burton was a member of The People's Supermarket, opened in Lamb's Conduit Street by Arthur Potts Dawson in 2010. Burton regularly appeared in the Channel 4 documentary of the same name in 2011.

In 2012, Burton appeared on Radio 4's Midweek program for an interview, celebrating 40 years of her career.

In 2018, Burton's work was featured in an exhibition at the SFO Museum in San Francisco International Airport, called "A Sterling Renaissance: British Silver Design 1957-2018".
