= Anthony de Mello =

Anthony de Mello may refer to:

- Anthony de Mello (Jesuit priest) (1931–1987), Indian author and psychotherapist
- Anthony de Mello (cricket administrator) (1900–1961)
  - Anthony de Mello Trophy, a cricketing award named after him
