= South African cricket team in India in 2019–20 =

International cricket tour

| | India | South Africa |
- Dates: 15 September 2019 – 18 March 2020
| Captains | Virat Kohli | Faf du Plessis (Tests); Quinton de Kock (ODIs & T20Is) |

Test series
- Result: India won the 3-match series 3–0
| Most runs | Rohit Sharma (529) | Dean Elgar (232) |
| Most wickets | Ravichandran Ashwin (15) | Kagiso Rabada (7) |
- Player of the series: Rohit Sharma (Ind)

One Day International series
- Results: 3-match series drawn 0–0

Twenty20 International series
- Results: 3-match series drawn 1–1
| Most runs | Virat Kohli (81) | Quinton de Kock (131) |
| Most wickets | Deepak Chahar (2); Hardik Pandya (2) | Bjorn Fortuin (3); Kagiso Rabada (3) |
- Player of the series: Quinton de Kock (SA)

The South Africa cricket team toured India in September and October 2019 to play three Tests and three Twenty20 International (T20I) matches. The Test series formed part of the inaugural 2019–2021 ICC World Test Championship.

In August 2019, Cricket South Africa confirmed that Faf du Plessis would lead the Test side for the tour, with Quinton de Kock named captain of the T20I team. Later the same month, as per the request of the Jharkhand Cricket Association, due to Durga Puja celebrations in the second week of October in Ranchi, the Committee of Administrators (CoA) agreed to switch the venues of the second and third Tests. Pune, which was originally scheduled to host the third Test, hosted the second Test, with Ranchi hosting the third Test match.

The three-match T20I series was drawn 1–1, after the first fixture was washed out. In the Test series, India won the first two matches to take an unassailable 2–0 lead. It was India's eleventh-consecutive series win at home, setting a new record for any team in Test cricket. India won the final Test by an innings and 202 runs to win the series 3–0. It was India's first whitewash in a bilateral Test series against South Africa. South Africa lost the last two Tests by an innings. The last time they had lost consecutive Test matches by an innings margin was during Australia's visit in 1935–36.

South Africa returned to India in March 2020 to play three One Day International (ODI) matches. On 6 March 2020, Cricket South Africa announced that the trip to India for the ODI matches would still go ahead, despite the COVID-19 pandemic. After the first ODI, which was abandoned with no play due to rain, the Board of Control for Cricket in India (BCCI) confirmed that the two remaining ODIs would be played behind closed doors, in an attempt to reduce the impact of the coronavirus. However, on 13 March 2020, the remaining two ODI matches were cancelled.

== Squads ==
| Test | | ODIs | | T20Is | |
| India | South Africa | India | South Africa | India | South Africa |
|---|---|---|---|---|---|
| Virat Kohli (c); Ajinkya Rahane (vc); Mayank Agarwal; Ravichandran Ashwin; ~~Jasprit Bumrah~~; Shubman Gill; Ravindra Jadeja; Shahbaz Nadeem; Rishabh Pant (wk); Cheteshwar Pujara; Wriddhiman Saha (wk); Mohammed Shami; Ishant Sharma; Rohit Sharma; Hanuma Vihari; Kuldeep Yadav; Umesh Yadav | Faf du Plessis (c); Temba Bavuma (vc); Theunis de Bruyn; Quinton de Kock (wk); Dean Elgar; Zubayr Hamza; Heinrich Klaasen (wk); George Linde; Keshav Maharaj; Aiden Markram; Senuran Muthusamy; Lungi Ngidi; Anrich Nortje; Vernon Philander; Dane Piedt; Kagiso Rabada; ~~Rudi Second~~ (wk) | Virat Kohli (c); Jasprit Bumrah; Yuzvendra Chahal; Shikhar Dhawan; Shubman Gill; Shreyas Iyer; Ravindra Jadeja; Bhuvneshwar Kumar; Manish Pandey; Hardik Pandya; Rishabh Pant (wk); KL Rahul; Navdeep Saini; Prithvi Shaw; Kuldeep Yadav | Quinton de Kock (c, wk); Temba Bavuma; Faf du Plessis; Beuran Hendricks; Heinrich Klaasen; George Linde; Keshav Maharaj; Janneman Malan; David Miller; Lungi Ngidi; Anrich Nortje; Andile Phehlukwayo; Lutho Sipamla; JJ Smuts; Rassie van der Dussen; Kyle Verreynne | Virat Kohli (c); Rohit Sharma (vc); Khaleel Ahmed; Deepak Chahar; Rahul Chahar; Shikhar Dhawan; Shreyas Iyer; Ravindra Jadeja; Manish Pandey; Hardik Pandya; Krunal Pandya; Rishabh Pant (wk); KL Rahul; Navdeep Saini; Washington Sundar | Quinton de Kock (c, wk); Rassie van der Dussen (vc); Temba Bavuma; Junior Dala; Bjorn Fortuin; Beuran Hendricks; Reeza Hendricks; George Linde; David Miller; Anrich Nortje; Andile Phehlukwayo; Dwaine Pretorius; Kagiso Rabada; Tabraiz Shamsi; ~~JJ Smuts~~ |

Ahead of the tour, Rudi Second was ruled out of South Africa's Test squad due to injury. He was replaced by Heinrich Klaasen. JJ Smuts was also ruled out of South Africa's T20I squad due to fitness concerns, and was replaced by George Linde. Jasprit Bumrah was ruled out of India's Test squad due to a stress fracture, with Umesh Yadav replacing him. Ahead of the third and final Test, Keshav Maharaj was ruled out of South Africa's squad with a shoulder injury, and was replaced by George Linde. Shahbaz Nadeem was added to India's squad for the third Test, as cover for Kuldeep Yadav. Ahead of the ODI series, Janneman Malan was added to South Africa's squad.

== Tour match ==
=== Three-day match: Indian Board President's XI vs South Africa ===
26–28 September 2019
Scorecard

| South Africa | v | (India) Indian Board President's XI |
| 279/6d (64 overs); Aiden Markram 100 (118); Dharmendrasinh Jadeja 3/66 (12 overs) | | 265/8 (64 overs); K. S. Bharat 71 (57); Keshav Maharaj 3/35 (13.1 overs) |

Match drawn
Dr PVG Raju ACA Sports Complex, Vizianagaram
Umpires: K. N. Ananthapadmanabhan (Ind) and Krishnamachari Srinivasan (Ind)

- South Africa won the toss and elected to bat.
- No play was possible on day 1 due to rain.

== T20I series ==
=== 1st T20I ===
15 September 2019
19:00 (N)
Scorecard

| India | v | South Africa |

Match abandoned
Himachal Pradesh Cricket Association Stadium, Dharamshala
Umpires: Nitin Menon (Ind) and C. K. Nandan (Ind)

- No toss.
- No play was possible due to rain.

=== 2nd T20I ===
18 September 2019
19:00 (N)
Scorecard

| South Africa; 149/5 (20 overs) | v | India; 151/3 (19 overs) |
| Quinton de Kock 52 (37); Deepak Chahar 2/22 (4 overs) | | Virat Kohli 72* (52); Tabraiz Shamsi 1/19 (3 overs) |

India won by 7 wickets
Punjab Cricket Association IS Bindra Stadium, Mohali
Umpires: Anil Chaudhary (Ind) and Chettithody Shamshuddin (Ind)
Player of the match: Virat Kohli (Ind)

- India won the toss and elected to field.
- Temba Bavuma, Bjorn Fortuin and Anrich Nortje (SA) all made their T20I debuts.
- Quinton de Kock captained South Africa for the first time in T20Is.

=== 3rd T20I ===
22 September 2019
19:00 (N)
Scorecard

| India; 134/9 (20 overs) | v | South Africa; 140/1 (16.5 overs) |
| Shikhar Dhawan 36 (25); Kagiso Rabada 3/39 (4 overs) | | Quinton de Kock 79* (52); Hardik Pandya 1/23 (2 overs) |

South Africa won by 9 wickets
M. Chinnaswamy Stadium, Bengaluru
Umpires: Nitin Menon (Ind) and C. K. Nandan (Ind)
Player of the match: Beuran Hendricks (SA)

- India won the toss and elected to bat.
- Rohit Sharma became the joint-most capped cricketer for India in T20Is (98 matches).

== Test series ==
=== 1st Test ===
2–6 October 2019
Scorecard

| India | v | South Africa |
| 502/7d (136 overs); Mayank Agarwal 215 (371); Keshav Maharaj 3/189 (55 overs) | | 431 (131.2 overs); Dean Elgar 160 (287); Ravichandran Ashwin 7/145 (46.2 overs) |
| 323/4d (67 overs); Rohit Sharma 127 (149); Keshav Maharaj 2/129 (22 overs) | | 191 (63.5 overs); Dane Piedt 56 (107); Mohammed Shami 5/35 (10.5 overs) |

India won by 203 runs
ACA–VDCA Cricket Stadium, Vishakhapatnam
Umpires: Chris Gaffaney (NZ) and Richard Illingworth (Eng)
Player of the match: Rohit Sharma (Ind)

- India won the toss and elected to bat.
- No play was possible after tea on day 1 due to rain.
- Senuran Muthusamy (SA) made his Test debut.
- Mayank Agarwal (Ind) scored his first century, which he converted into his first double century in Tests.
- Ravindra Jadeja (Ind) took his 200th wicket in Tests.
- Ravichandran Ashwin (Ind) became the joint-fastest bowler, in terms of matches, to take 350 wickets in Tests (66).
- World Test Championship points: India 40, South Africa 0.

=== 2nd Test ===
10–14 October 2019 (Note: While five days of play were scheduled for each Test, the second and third Tests reached a result in four days.)
Scorecard

| India | v | South Africa |
| 601/5d (156.3 overs); Virat Kohli 254* (336); Kagiso Rabada 3/93 (30 overs) | | 275 (105.4 overs); Keshav Maharaj 72 (132); Ravichandran Ashwin 4/69 (28.4 overs) |
| | | 189 (67.2 overs) (f/o); Dean Elgar 48 (72); Umesh Yadav 3/22 (8 overs) |

India won by an innings and 137 runs
Maharashtra Cricket Association Stadium, Pune
Umpires: Chris Gaffaney (NZ) and Nigel Llong (Eng)
Player of the match: Virat Kohli (Ind)

- India won the toss and elected to bat.
- Anrich Nortje (SA) made his Test debut.
- Keshav Maharaj (SA) took his 100th wicket in Tests.
- Virat Kohli captained India for the 50th time in Tests.
- Virat Kohli also scored his 7,000th run in Tests and became the first batsman for India to score seven double centuries in Tests.
- India regained the Freedom Trophy as a result of this match.
- World Test Championship points: India 40, South Africa 0.

=== 3rd Test ===
19–23 October 2019
Scorecard

| India | v | South Africa |
| 497/9d (116.3 overs); Rohit Sharma 212 (255); George Linde 4/133 (31 overs) | | 162 (56.2 overs); Zubayr Hamza 62 (79); Umesh Yadav 3/40 (9 overs) |
| | | 133 (48 overs) (f/o); Theunis de Bruyn 30 (49); Mohammed Shami 3/10 (10 overs) |

India won by an innings and 202 runs
JSCA International Stadium Complex, Ranchi
Umpires: Richard Illingworth (Eng) and Nigel Llong (Eng)
Player of the match: Rohit Sharma (Ind)

- India won the toss and elected to bat.
- 32 overs and 34 overs were lost on days 1 and 2 respectively due to bad light.
- Shahbaz Nadeem (Ind), Heinrich Klaasen and George Linde (SA) all made their Test debuts.
- Rohit Sharma (Ind) scored his 2,000th run and his first double century in Tests.
- In the second innings of the match, Theunis de Bruyn replaced Dean Elgar as a concussion substitute in South Africa's squad.
- World Test Championship points: India 40, South Africa 0.

== ODI series ==
=== 1st ODI ===
12 March 2020
13:30 (D/N)
Scorecard

| India | v | South Africa |

Match abandoned
HPCA Stadium, Dharamsala
Umpires: Virender Sharma (Ind) and Joel Wilson (WI)

- No toss.
- No play was possible due to rain.

=== 2nd ODI ===
15 March 2020
13:30 (D/N)
Scorecard

| India | v | South Africa |

Match cancelled
Ekana International Cricket Stadium, Lucknow
Umpires: Anil Chaudhary (Ind) and Richard Kettleborough (Eng)

- The match was cancelled due to COVID-19 outbreak.

=== 3rd ODI ===
18 March 2020
13:30 (D/N)
Scorecard

| India | v | South Africa |

Match cancelled
Eden Gardens, Kolkata
Umpires: Chettithody Shamshuddin (Ind) and Joel Wilson (WI)

- The match was cancelled due to COVID-19 outbreak.
