= Anthony de Mello Trophy =

Defunct Test cricket series between India and England

- Countries: India; England
- Administrator: Board of Control for Cricket in India
- Format: Test Cricket
- First edition: 1951–52
- Latest edition: 2023–24
- Tournament format: 5-match test series
- Number of teams: 2
- Host: India
- Current trophy holder: India (2024)
- Most successful: India (9 series wins, 2 retentions & 1 shared)
- Qualification: ICC World Test Championship
- Most runs: (India) Sunil Gavaskar (1,331)
- Most wickets: (India) Ravichandran Ashwin (74)
- TV: Viacom 18

The Anthony de Mello Trophy was awarded to the winner of England–India Test cricket series held in India. The trophy was instituted in 1951, when England toured India for a five-match Test series. The trophy was named after Anthony de Mello, an Indian cricket administrator and one of the founders of the Board of Control for Cricket in India (BCCI).

When the matches were played in England, teams were awarded the Pataudi Trophy until both trophies were replaced by the Anderson–Tendulkar Trophy in June 2025. That trophy was instituted by the Marylebone Cricket Club (MCC) in 2007 to mark the 75th anniversary of the first England–India Test series held in England in 1932. The trophy was named after the Pataudi cricketing family. In 2012, the Pataudi family requested to make the Pataudi Trophy the winner's prize in India as well as England. However, the BCCI said it would not rename the trophy awarded in India.

In 2012, England won the Anthony de Mello Trophy, their first series win in India since 1984–85, India won the series 3–1 in 2020–21 thus qualifying for the 2019–21 ICC World Test Championship final against New Zealand which they subsequently lost. The last series was played in 2023–24, which India won by 4–1.

== Editions ==
Series	Years	First match	Tests	India	England	Drawn	Result	Holder	Ref
1	1951–52	9 November 1951	5	1	1	3	Drawn	Both	
2	1961–62	11 November 1961	5	2	0	3	India	India	
3	1963–64	10 January 1964	5	0	0	5	Drawn	India	
4	1972–73	20 December 1972	5	2	1	2	India	India	
5	1976–77	17 December 1976	5	1	3	1	England	England	
6	1981–82	27 November 1981	6	1	0	5	India	India	
7	1984–85	28 November 1984	5	1	2	2	England	England	
8	1992–93	29 January 1993	3	3	0	0	India	India	
9	2001–02	3 December 2001	3	1	0	2	India	India	
10	2005–06	1 March 2006	3	1	1	1	Drawn	India	
11	2008–09	11 December 2008	2	1	0	1	India	India	
12	2012–13	15 November 2012	4	1	2	1	England	England	
13	2016–17	9 November 2016	5	4	0	1	India	India	
14	2020–21	5 February 2021	4	3	1	0	India	India	
15	2023–24	25 January 2024	5	4	1	0	India	India	

Total Series	India	England	Drawn
15	9	3	3

=== Player of the series ===
Years	Player of the series
1981–82	(India) Kapil Dev
1984–85	(England) Mike Gatting
1992–93	(India) Anil Kumble
2001–02	(India) Sachin Tendulkar
2005–06	(England) Andrew Flintoff
2008–09	(India) Zaheer Khan
2012–13	(England) Alastair Cook
2016–17	(India) Virat Kohli
2020–21	(India) Ravichandran Ashwin
2023–24	(India) Yashasvi Jaiswal

== See also ==
- Pataudi Trophy
- Anderson–Tendulkar Trophy
- Border–Gavaskar Trophy
- Gandhi–Mandela Trophy
