= Indian cricket team in South Africa in 2017–18 =

International cricket tour

	South Africa	India
- Dates: 5 January 2018 – 24 February 2018
Captains	Faf du Plessis (Tests and ODIs) (Note: Aiden Markram captained South Africa for the last five ODI matches.); JP Duminy (T20Is)	Virat Kohli (Note: Rohit Sharma captained India for the 3rd T20I.)

Test series
- Result: South Africa won the 3-match series 2–1
Most runs	AB de Villiers (211)	Virat Kohli (286)
Most wickets	Vernon Philander (15); Kagiso Rabada (15)	Mohammed Shami (15)
- Player of the series: Vernon Philander (SA)

One Day International series
- Results: India won the 6-match series 5–1
Most runs	Hashim Amla (154)	Virat Kohli (558)
Most wickets	Lungi Ngidi (8)	Kuldeep Yadav (17)
- Player of the series: Virat Kohli (Ind)

Twenty20 International series
- Results: India won the 3-match series 2–1
Most runs	JP Duminy (122)	Shikhar Dhawan (143)
Most wickets	Junior Dala (7)	Bhuvneshwar Kumar (7)
- Player of the series: Bhuvneshwar Kumar (Ind)

The India cricket team toured South Africa in January and February 2018 to play three Tests, six One Day Internationals (ODIs) and three Twenty20 International (T20I) matches. In January 2017, Cricket South Africa (CSA) revealed that this tour would replace the scheduled visit by Sri Lanka due to costs and scheduling congestion. The Test series was played for the Freedom Trophy, with South Africa winning the trophy following victories in the first two Tests. South Africa went on to win the Test series 2–1. It was the first Test series of three matches or more in which all 40 wickets fell in each match of the series. With India's win the third Test, they retained the number one place in the ICC Test Championship, taking an unassailable lead before the April 2018 cut-off date for next season's rankings.

In August 2017, it was announced that the traditional Boxing Day Test at Kingsmead will not take place, as India's home series against Sri Lanka will not conclude until 24 December 2017. The following month it was announced that tour would likely start on 5 January 2018. CSA confirmed the fixtures in September 2017. Before the Test matches, India were scheduled to play in a two-day warm-up match at Boland Park, Paarl. However, this was cancelled, as India opted to do training sessions instead of the match.

The Test series marked Dale Steyn's return to international cricket. He last played in a Test match for South Africa in November 2016 against Australia in Perth, where he suffered a shoulder injury. However, on day two of the first Test, Steyn damaged his left heel. This ruled him out of the rest of the Test, with a recovery time of 4 to 6 weeks. Two days later, he was ruled out of the rest of the series.

During the first ODI, South Africa's captain, Faf du Plessis, suffered a finger injury and was ruled out of the remaining ODI matches. Aiden Markram was named as South Africa's captain for the remaining ODI fixtures, becoming the second-youngest South African to lead South Africa in ODIs.

India ensured an ODI series victory after beating South Africa by 73 runs in the fifth match, after they had already won the first three fixtures. This resulted in India's first ODI series win in South Africa, with India maintaining their number one ranking in the ICC ODI Championship. India went on to win the ODI series 5–1. Virat Kohli scored the most runs in a bilateral ODI series by a player, with 558. India were also victorious in the T20I matches, winning the series 2–1.

== Squads ==
Tests		ODIs		T20Is	
South Africa	India	South Africa	India	South Africa	India
Faf du Plessis (c); Hashim Amla; Temba Bavuma; Theunis de Bruyn; Quinton de Kock (wk); AB de Villiers; Dean Elgar; Keshav Maharaj; Aiden Markram; Morné Morkel; Chris Morris; Duanne Olivier; Lungi Ngidi; Andile Phehlukwayo; Vernon Philander; Kagiso Rabada; Dale Steyn	Virat Kohli (c); Ajinkya Rahane (vc); Ravichandran Ashwin; Jasprit Bumrah; Shikhar Dhawan; Ravindra Jadeja; Dinesh Karthik; Bhuvneshwar Kumar; Hardik Pandya; Parthiv Patel; Cheteshwar Pujara; KL Rahul; Wriddhiman Saha (wk); Mohammed Shami; Ishant Sharma; Rohit Sharma; Murali Vijay; Umesh Yadav	~~Faf du Plessis (c)~~; Aiden Markram (c); Hashim Amla; Farhaan Behardien; Quinton de Kock (wk); AB de Villiers; JP Duminy; Imran Tahir; Heinrich Klaasen; David Miller; Morné Morkel; Chris Morris; Lungi Ngidi; Andile Phehlukwayo; Kagiso Rabada; Tabraiz Shamsi; Khaya Zondo	Virat Kohli (c); Rohit Sharma (vc); Jasprit Bumrah; Yuzvendra Chahal; Shikhar Dhawan; MS Dhoni (wk); Shreyas Iyer; Kedar Jadhav; Dinesh Karthik; Bhuvneshwar Kumar; Manish Pandey; Hardik Pandya; Axar Patel; Ajinkya Rahane; Mohammed Shami; Shardul Thakur; Kuldeep Yadav	JP Duminy (c); Farhaan Behardien; Junior Dala; ~~AB de Villiers~~; Reeza Hendricks; Christiaan Jonker; Heinrich Klaasen (wk); David Miller; Chris Morris; Dane Paterson; Aaron Phangiso; Andile Phehlukwayo; Tabraiz Shamsi; JJ Smuts	Virat Kohli (c); Rohit Sharma (vc); Jasprit Bumrah; Yuzvendra Chahal; Shikhar Dhawan; MS Dhoni (wk); Bhuvneshwar Kumar; Dinesh Karthik; Manish Pandey; Hardik Pandya; Axar Patel; KL Rahul; Suresh Raina; Shardul Thakur; Jaydev Unadkat; Kuldeep Yadav

Duanne Olivier and Lungi Ngidi were added to South Africa's squad for the second Test after Dale Steyn suffered an injury during the first Test. Dinesh Karthik was called up as replacement to India's Test squad for Wriddhiman Saha after Saha was ruled out of the series due to an injury in training. Temba Bavuma suffered a finger injury in a domestic one-day game and was ruled out of South Africa's squad ahead of the third and final Test. South Africa's AB de Villiers was ruled out of first three ODIs due to a finger injury. He was added back into South Africa's squad for the final three matches.

Following the first ODI, Faf du Plessis was ruled out of South Africa's squad for the remaining ODI matches and the T20I series, after suffering a finger injury. Du Plessis was replaced by Farhaan Behardien in the ODI squad and Heinrich Klaasen was added to South Africa's squad as a reserve wicket-keeper. Aiden Markram was named as captain of South Africa for the remaining ODIs in du Plessis' absence. South Africa's Quinton de Kock suffered an injury during the second ODI and was ruled out of the rest of the ODI matches and the T20I series.

AB de Villiers was ruled out of South Africa's squad for the T20I series after suffering an injury before the fifth ODI match.

== Test series ==
=== 1st Test ===
5–9 January 2018 (Note: While five days of play were scheduled for each Test, the first and third Tests reached a result within four days.)
Scorecard

South Africa	v	India
286 (73.1 overs); AB de Villiers 65 (84); Jasprit Bumrah 4/87 (19 overs)		209 (73.4 overs); Hardik Pandya 93 (95); Vernon Philander 3/33 (14.3 overs)
130 (41.2 overs); AB de Villiers 35 (50); Mohammed Shami 3/28 (12 overs)		135 (42.4 overs); Ravichandran Ashwin 37 (53); Vernon Philander 6/42 (15.4 overs)

South Africa won by 72 runs
Newlands Cricket Ground, Cape Town
Umpires: Michael Gough (Eng) and Richard Kettleborough (Eng)
Player of the match: Vernon Philander (SA)

- South Africa won the toss and elected to bat.
- No play was possible on day 3 due to rain.
- Jasprit Bumrah (Ind) made his Test debut.
- Wriddhiman Saha became the first wicket-keeper for India to take ten catches in a single Test.

=== 2nd Test ===
13–17 January 2018
Scorecard

South Africa	v	India
335 (113.5 overs); Aiden Markram 94 (150); Ravichandran Ashwin 4/113 (38.5 overs)		307 (92.1 overs); Virat Kohli 153 (217); Morné Morkel 4/60 (22.1 overs)
258 (91.3 overs); AB de Villiers 80 (121); Mohammed Shami 4/49 (16 overs)		151 (50.2 overs); Rohit Sharma 47 (74); Lungi Ngidi 6/39 (12.2 overs)

South Africa won by 135 runs
Centurion Park, Centurion
Umpires: Michael Gough (Eng) and Paul Reiffel (Aus)
Player of the match: Lungi Ngidi (SA)

- South Africa won the toss and elected to bat.
- Rain and bad light ended play early on day 3.
- Lungi Ngidi (SA) made his Test debut.
- Mohammed Shami (Ind) took his 100th wicket in Tests.
- Cheteshwar Pujara became the first batsman for India to be run out in both innings of a Test.
- Lungi Ngidi became the 23rd bowler for South Africa to take a five-wicket haul on Test debut.

=== 3rd Test ===
24–28 January 2018
Scorecard

India	v	South Africa
187 (76.4 overs); Virat Kohli 54 (106); Kagiso Rabada 3/39 (18.4 overs)		194 (65.5 overs); Hashim Amla 61 (121); Jasprit Bumrah 5/54 (18.5 overs)
247 (80.1 overs); Ajinkya Rahane 48 (68); Morné Morkel 3/47 (21 overs)		177 (73.3 overs); Dean Elgar 86* (240); Mohammed Shami 5/28 (12.3 overs)

India won by 63 runs
Wanderers Stadium, Johannesburg
Umpires: Aleem Dar (Pak) and Ian Gould (Eng)
Player of the match: Bhuvneshwar Kumar (Ind)

- India won the toss and elected to bat.
- Vernon Philander (SA) played in his 50th Test.
- Jasprit Bumrah (Ind) took his first five-wicket haul in Tests.
- Virat Kohli became the leading run-scorer as captain of India in Tests (3,456).
- Dean Elgar became the first South African to carry his bat twice in Tests since 1992.

== ODI series ==
=== 1st ODI ===
1 February 2018
13:00 (D/N)
Scorecard

South Africa; 269/8 (50 overs)	v	India; 270/4 (45.3 overs)
Faf du Plessis 120 (112); Kuldeep Yadav 3/34 (10 overs)		Virat Kohli 112 (119); Andile Phehlukwayo 2/42 (8 overs)

India won by 6 wickets
Kingsmead Cricket Ground, Durban
Umpires: Ian Gould (Eng) and Bongani Jele (SA)
Player of the match: Virat Kohli (Ind)

- South Africa won the toss and elected to bat.

=== 2nd ODI ===
4 February 2018
10:00
Scorecard

South Africa; 118 (32.2 overs)	v	India; 119/1 (20.3 overs)
JP Duminy 25 (39); Yuzvendra Chahal 5/22 (8.2 overs)		Shikhar Dhawan 51* (56); Kagiso Rabada 1/24 (5 overs)

India won by 9 wickets
Centurion Park, Centurion
Umpires: Aleem Dar (Pak) and Adrian Holdstock (SA)
Player of the match: Yuzvendra Chahal (Ind)

- India won the toss and elected to field.
- Khaya Zondo (SA) made his ODI debut.
- Aiden Markram became the second-youngest player to captain South Africa in ODIs.
- This was South Africa's lowest total at home in ODIs.
- Yuzvendra Chahal (Ind) took his first five-wicket haul in ODIs. His figures of 5/22 were the second-best by any spinner in South Africa after Nicky Boje's 5/21 in 2002.
- This was India's biggest winning margin against South Africa in ODIs, in terms of wickets (9).

=== 3rd ODI ===
7 February 2018
13:00 (D/N)
Scorecard

India; 303/6 (50 overs)	v	South Africa; 179 (40 overs)
Virat Kohli 160* (159); JP Duminy 2/60 (10 overs)		JP Duminy 51 (67); Kuldeep Yadav 4/23 (9 overs)

India won by 124 runs
Newlands Cricket Ground, Cape Town
Umpires: Ian Gould (Eng) and Adrian Holdstock (SA)
Player of the match: Virat Kohli (Ind)

- South Africa won the toss and elected to field.
- Heinrich Klaasen and Lungi Ngidi (SA) both made their ODI debuts.
- Virat Kohli (Ind) scored his 34th ODI century and most as captain of India in ODIs (12).
- MS Dhoni became the first wicket-keeper for India to effect 400 dismissals in ODIs.
- This was India's biggest win, in terms of runs, against South Africa in South Africa.

=== 4th ODI ===
10 February 2018
13:00 (D/N)
Scorecard

India; 289/7 (50 overs)	v	South Africa; 207/5 (25.3 overs)
Shikhar Dhawan 109 (105); Lungi Ngidi 2/52 (10 overs)		Heinrich Klaasen 43* (27); Kuldeep Yadav 2/51 (6 overs)

South Africa won by 5 wickets (DLS method)
Wanderers Stadium, Johannesburg
Umpires: Aleem Dar (Pak) and Bongani Jele (SA)
Player of the match: Heinrich Klaasen (SA)

- India won the toss and elected to bat.
- Rain set South Africa a revised target of 202 runs from 28 overs.
- Shikhar Dhawan (Ind) played in his 100th ODI and became the first batsman for India to score a century in his 100th ODI.

=== 5th ODI ===
13 February 2018
13:00 (D/N)
Scorecard

India; 274/7 (50 overs)	v	South Africa; 201 (42.2 overs)
Rohit Sharma 115 (126); Lungi Ngidi 4/51 (9 overs)		Hashim Amla 71 (92); Kuldeep Yadav 4/57 (10 overs)

India won by 73 runs
St George's Park, Port Elizabeth
Umpires: Shaun George (SA) and Ian Gould (Eng)
Player of the match: Rohit Sharma (Ind)

- South Africa won the toss and elected to field.

=== 6th ODI ===
16 February 2018
13:00 (D/N)
Scorecard

South Africa; 204 (46.5 overs)	v	India; 206/2 (32.1 overs)
Khaya Zondo 54 (74); Shardul Thakur 4/52 (8.5 overs)		Virat Kohli 129* (96); Lungi Ngidi 2/54 (8 overs)

India won by 8 wickets
Centurion Park, Centurion
Umpires: Aleem Dar (Pak) and Shaun George (SA)
Player of the match: Virat Kohli (Ind)

- India won the toss and elected to field.
- Virat Kohli (Ind) scored his 35th century in ODIs.
- Virat Kohli also became the fastest player, in terms of innings, to score 17,000 runs in international cricket (363).
- Virat Kohli scored the most runs in a bilateral ODI series by a player (558).
- AB de Villiers, Morne Morkel (SA) and Ajinkya Rahane (Ind) all played in their last ODI.

== T20I series ==
=== 1st T20I ===
18 February 2018
14:30
Scorecard

India; 203/5 (20 overs)	v	South Africa; 175/9 (20 overs)
Shikhar Dhawan 72 (39); Junior Dala 2/47 (4 overs)		Reeza Hendricks 70 (50); Bhuvneshwar Kumar 5/24 (4 overs)

India won by 28 runs
Wanderers Stadium, Johannesburg
Umpires: Shaun George (SA) and Adrian Holdstock (SA)
Player of the match: Bhuvneshwar Kumar (Ind)

- South Africa won the toss and elected to field.
- Junior Dala and Heinrich Klaasen (SA) both made their T20I debuts.
- This was India's highest total against South Africa in T20Is.
- Bhuvneshwar Kumar (Ind) took his first five-wicket haul in T20Is.

=== 2nd T20I ===
21 February 2018
18:00 (N)
Scorecard

India; 188/4 (20 overs)	v	South Africa; 189/4 (18.4 overs)
Manish Pandey 79* (48); Junior Dala 2/28 (4 overs)		Heinrich Klaasen 69 (30); Jaydev Unadkat 2/42 (3.4 overs)

South Africa won by 6 wickets
Centurion Park, Centurion
Umpires: Bongani Jele (SA) and Allahudien Paleker (SA)
Player of the match: Heinrich Klaasen (SA)

- South Africa won the toss and elected to field.
- Shardul Thakur (Ind) made his T20I debut.
- Yuzvendra Chahal conceded the most runs by an Indian bowler in a T20I.

=== 3rd T20I ===
24 February 2018
18:00 (N)
Scorecard

India; 172/7 (20 overs)	v	South Africa; 165/6 (20 overs)
Shikhar Dhawan 47 (40); Junior Dala 3/35 (4 overs)		JP Duminy 55 (41); Bhuvneshwar Kumar 2/24 (4 overs)

India won by 7 runs
Newlands Cricket Ground, Cape Town
Umpires: Shaun George (SA) and Bongani Jele (SA)
Player of the match: Suresh Raina (Ind)

- South Africa won the toss and elected to field.
- Christiaan Jonker (SA) made his T20I debut.
