= Gandhi–Mandela Trophy =

Test cricket series between India and South Africa

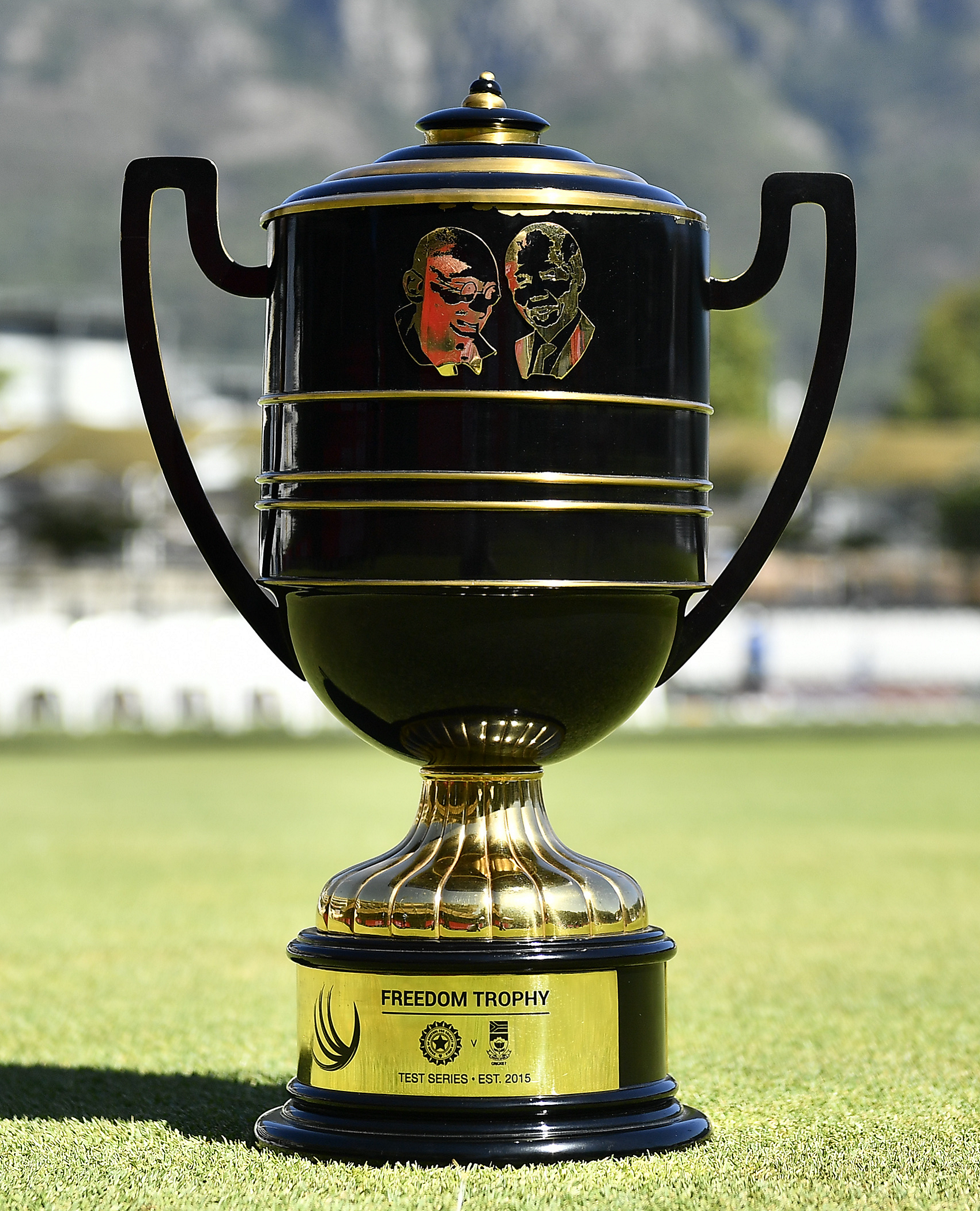
- Tournament logo
- Countries: India; South Africa
- Administrator: Cricket South Africa; Board of Control for Cricket in India
- Format: Test cricket
- First edition: 2015–16 (India)
- Latest edition: 2025–26 (India)
- Next edition: TBD
- Tournament format: Test Series
- Number of teams: 2
- Current trophy holder: South Africa
- Most successful: South Africa (3 series wins & 1 retention)
- Qualification: ICC World Test Championship
- Most runs: (India) Virat Kohli (1,136)
- Most wickets: (India) Ravichandran Ashwin (57)

The Gandhi–Mandela Trophy, also known as The Freedom Trophy, is a cricket trophy that is awarded to the winner of Test series, known as The Freedom Series, between India and South Africa. First awarded in 2015, the trophy is dedicated to famous Indian and South African freedom fighters Mahatma Gandhi and Nelson Mandela respectively.

== Background Test Series ==
Prior to the trophy's inception, India and South Africa had played eleven series, six in South Africa and five in India. The overall record was six South African victories, two Indian victories, and three drawn series.

| Years | Host | Tests | India | South Africa | Drawn | Result |
|---|---|---|---|---|---|---|
| 1992–93 | South Africa | 4 | 0 | 1 | 3 | South Africa |
| 1996–97 | India | 3 | 2 | 1 | 0 | India |
| 1996–97 | South Africa | 3 | 0 | 2 | 1 | South Africa |
| 1999–2000 | India | 2 | 0 | 2 | 0 | South Africa |
| 2001–02 | South Africa | 2 | 0 | 1 | 1 | South Africa |
| 2004–05 | India | 2 | 1 | 0 | 1 | India |
| 2006–07 | South Africa | 3 | 1 | 2 | 0 | South Africa |
| 2007–08 | India | 3 | 1 | 1 | 1 | Drawn |
| 2009–10 | India | 2 | 1 | 1 | 0 | Drawn |
| 2010–11 | South Africa | 3 | 1 | 1 | 1 | Drawn |
| 2013–14 | South Africa | 2 | 0 | 1 | 1 | South Africa |
| Total | | 29 | 7 | 13 | 9 | |

In 2015 BCCI and CSA announced that all future bilateral tours of India and South Africa to be named as Mahatma Gandhi–Nelson Mandela Bilateral series. The series is played in Test cricket format. The series is named after leaders of both countries to pay tribute to them for playing a major role in winning independence by nonviolence. This has also helped in gaining an "iconic and traditional status" to the series.

The Test Series has been christened as the 'Freedom Trophy'. Freedom for which Mahatma Gandhi and Nelson Mandela sacrificed their lives and thereby allowed a nation to be born free from years of bondage and suppression. BCCI, on behalf of every citizen of our country, is able to pay tribute to these great leaders by naming the series after them, and appeals to each and every citizen of our country to imbibe their ideals and follow the path advised by them

— BCCI secretary Anurag Thakur

For the people of both our countries there is no greater duty than to uphold the ideals of both Mahatma Gandhi and Nelson Mandela. As cricket-loving people we must fight hard to win on the field of play but never forget to do battle in the spirit of these two great men.

— CSA chief executive, Haroon Lorgat

== Editions ==
| Series | Years | Host | Tests | India | South Africa | Drawn | Result | Holder | Player of the series |
|---|---|---|---|---|---|---|---|---|---|
| 1 | 2015–16 | India | 4 | 3 | 0 | 1 | India | India | (India) Ravichandran Ashwin |
| 2 | 2017–18 | South Africa | 3 | 1 | 2 | 0 | South Africa | South Africa | (South Africa) Vernon Philander |
| 3 | 2019–20 | India | 3 | 3 | 0 | 0 | India | India | (India) Rohit Sharma |
| 4 | 2021–22 | South Africa | 3 | 1 | 2 | 0 | South Africa | South Africa | (South Africa) Keegan Petersen |
| 5 | 2023–24 | South Africa | 2 | 1 | 1 | 0 | Drawn | South Africa | (India) Jasprit Bumrah (South Africa) Dean Elgar |
| 6 | 2025–26 | India | 2 | 0 | 2 | 0 | South Africa | South Africa | (South Africa) Simon Harmer |
| Total | | | 17 | 9 | 7 | 1 | | | |

| Total Series | India | South Africa | Drawn |
|---|---|---|---|
| 6 | 2 | 3 | 1 |

== Results ==
| | Played | Won by India | Won by South Africa | Drawn |
|---|---|---|---|---|
| Tests in India | 9 | 6 (66.7%) | 2 (22.2%) | 1 (11.1%) |
| Tests in South Africa | 8 | 3 (37.5%) | 5 (62.5%) | 0 (0%) |
| All Tests | 17 | 9 (52.9%) | 7 (47.1%) | 1 (5.9%) |
| Series in India | 3 | 2 (66.7%) | 1 (33.3%) | 0 (0%) |
| Series in South Africa | 3 | 0 (0%) | 2 (66.7%) | 1 (33.3%) |
| All series | 6 | 2 (33.3%) | 3 (50%) | 1 (16.7%) |
As of 26 November 2025

== Match venues ==
In India
| Stadium | First Test | Last Test | Played | India wins | Draws* | South Africa wins | Ref |
|---|---|---|---|---|---|---|---|
| I. S. Bindra Stadium, Mohali | 2015–16 | 2015–16 | 1 | 1 | 0 | 0 | |
| M. Chinnaswamy Stadium, Bengaluru | 2015–16 | 2015–16 | 1 | 0 | 1 | 0 | |
| VCA Stadium, Nagpur | 2015–16 | 2015–16 | 1 | 1 | 0 | 0 | |
| Arun Jaitley Stadium, Delhi | 2015–16 | 2015–16 | 1 | 1 | 0 | 0 | |
| ACA–VDCA Cricket Stadium, Visakhapatnam | 2019–20 | 2019–20 | 1 | 1 | 0 | 0 | |
| MCA Stadium, Pune | 2019–20 | 2019–20 | 1 | 1 | 0 | 0 | |
| JSCA Stadium, Ranchi | 2019–20 | 2019–20 | 1 | 1 | 0 | 0 | |
| Eden Gardens, Kolkata | 2025–26 | 2025–26 | 1 | 0 | 0 | 1 | |
| Barsapara Cricket Stadium, Guwahati | 2025–26 | 2025–26 | 1 | 0 | 0 | 1 | |
In South Africa
| Stadium | First Test | Last Test | Played | South Africa wins | Draws* | India wins | Ref |
| Newlands, Cape Town | 2017–18 | 2023–24 | 3 | 2 | 0 | 1 | |
| Centurion Park, Centurion | 2017–18 | 2023–24 | 3 | 2 | 0 | 1 | |
| Wanderers Stadium, Johannesburg | 2017–18 | 2021–22 | 2 | 1 | 0 | 1 | |

== See also ==
- Pataudi Trophy
- Anthony de Mello Trophy
- Anderson–Tendulkar Trophy
- Border–Gavaskar Trophy
- The Ashes
- Basil D'Oliveira Trophy
- Tangiwai Shield
