= South African cricket team in India in 2015–16 =

International cricket tour

	India	South Africa
- Dates: 29 September 2015 – 7 December 2015
Captains	Virat Kohli (Tests); MS Dhoni (ODIs, T20Is)	Hashim Amla (Tests); AB de Villiers (ODIs); Faf du Plessis (T20Is)

Test series
- Result: India won the 4-match series 3–0
Most runs	Ajinkya Rahane (266)	AB de Villiers (258)
Most wickets	Ravichandran Ashwin (31)	Imran Tahir (14)
- Player of the series: Ravichandran Ashwin (Ind)

One Day International series
- Results: South Africa won the 5-match series 3–2
Most runs	Rohit Sharma (255)	AB de Villiers (358)
Most wickets	Bhuvneshwar Kumar (7)	Kagiso Rabada (10); Dale Steyn (10)
- Player of the series: AB de Villiers (SA)

Twenty20 International series
- Results: South Africa won the 3-match series 2–0
Most runs	Rohit Sharma (128)	JP Duminy (98)
Most wickets	Ravichandran Ashwin (4)	Albie Morkel (3); Chris Morris (3)
- Player of the series: JP Duminy (SA)

The South African cricket team toured India from 29 September to 7 December 2015. The tour consisted of four Test matches, five One Day International (ODI) and three Twenty20 International (T20I) matches. This was the first time a four-match Test series between the two nations has been played in India and the first time that South Africa played a T20I against India in India. India won the Test series while South Africa won both the ODI and T20I series.

Starting with this series, all bilateral tours between India and South Africa were called the Mahatma Gandhi-Nelson Mandela series, with the teams playing for the Freedom Trophy.

== Squads ==
Tests		ODIs		T20I	
India	South Africa	India	South Africa	India	South Africa
Virat Kohli (c); Varun Aaron; Ravichandran Ashwin; Stuart Binny; Shikhar Dhawan; Ravindra Jadeja; Bhuvneshwar Kumar; Amit Mishra; Cheteshwar Pujara; Ajinkya Rahane; KL Rahul; Wriddhiman Saha (wk); Ishant Sharma; Rohit Sharma; Murali Vijay; Umesh Yadav	Hashim Amla (c); AB de Villiers; Temba Bavuma; JP Duminy; Faf du Plessis; Dean Elgar; Simon Harmer; Imran Tahir; Morne Morkel; ~~Vernon Philander~~; Dane Piedt; Kagiso Rabada; Dale Steyn; Stiaan van Zyl; Dane Vilas(wk); Kyle Abbott; Marchant de Lange	MS Dhoni (c) (wk); Sreenath Aravind; Ravichandran Ashwin; Stuart Binny; Shikhar Dhawan; Virat Kohli; Bhuvneshwar Kumar; Amit Mishra; Axar Patel; Ajinkya Rahane; Suresh Raina; Ambati Rayudu; Mohit Sharma; Rohit Sharma; Gurkeerat Singh; Umesh Yadav; Harbhajan Singh	AB de Villiers (c); Kyle Abbott; Hashim Amla; Farhaan Behardien; Quinton de Kock (wk); JP Duminy; Faf du Plessis; Imran Tahir; David Miller; Morne Morkel; Chris Morris; Aaron Phangiso; Kagiso Rabada; ~~Rilee Rossouw~~; Dale Steyn; Khaya Zondo; Dean Elgar	MS Dhoni (c) (wk); Sreenath Aravind; Ravichandran Ashwin; Stuart Binny; Shikhar Dhawan; Virat Kohli; Bhuvneshwar Kumar; Amit Mishra; Axar Patel; Ajinkya Rahane; Suresh Raina; Ambati Rayudu; Mohit Sharma; Rohit Sharma; Harbhajan Singh	Faf du Plessis (c); Kyle Abbott; Hashim Amla; Farhaan Behardien; Quinton de Kock (wk); Marchant de Lange; AB de Villiers; JP Duminy; Imran Tahir; Eddie Leie; David Miller; Chris Morris; Kagiso Rabada; ~~David Wiese~~; Khaya Zondo; Albie Morkel

South Africa's David Wiese was ruled out of the T20I series with a fractured hand and was replaced by Albie Morkel. Rilee Rossouw was ruled out of the ODI series following a stress fracture to his foot and was replaced by Khaya Zondo. Harbhajan Singh was added to India's ODI squad as Ravichandran Ashwin sustained a left side strain injury during the first ODI. JP Duminy was ruled out of the last two ODI matches after suffering a hand injury. He was replaced by Dean Elgar. Duminy is expected to be fit for the Test series. Vernon Philander was ruled out of the last three Test matches after suffering an ankle injury and was replaced by Kyle Abbott. Marchant de Lange was added to South Africa's Test squad as cover for Dale Steyn.

== Tour matches ==
=== T20: India A vs South Africans ===
29 September
Scorecard

South Africans; 189/3 (20 overs)	v	India A 193/2 (19.4 overs)
JP Duminy 68* (32); Hardik Pandya 1/16 (2 overs)		Mayank Agarwal 87 (49); JP Duminy 1/22 (2 overs)

India A won by 8 wickets
Palam A Stadium, Palam
Umpires: Anil Chaudhary (Ind) and Virender Sharma (Ind)

- South Africans won the toss and elected to bat.
- 12 players per side (11 batting, 11 fielding).

=== Two-day: Indian Board President's XI vs South Africans ===
30–31 October
Scorecard

Indian Board President's XI	v	South Africans
296 (78.5 overs); Lokesh Rahul 72 (132); Simon Harmer 3/41 (11 overs)		302 (69.2 overs); AB de Villiers 112 (131); Shardul Thakur 4/70 (16 overs)
92/0 (30 overs); Cheteshwar Pujara 49* (90)

Match drawn
Brabourne Stadium, Mumbai
Umpires: Subrat Das (Ind) and Umesh Dubey (Ind)

- Indian Board President's XI won the toss and elected to bat.
- 14 players per side (11 batting, 11 fielding).

== T20I series ==
=== 1st T20I ===
2 October
Scorecard

India; 199/5 (20 overs)	v	South Africa; 200/3 (19.4 overs)
Rohit Sharma 106 (66); Kyle Abbott 2/29 (4 overs)		JP Duminy 68* (34); Ravichandran Ashwin 1/26 (4 overs)

South Africa won by 7 wickets
HPCA Stadium, Dharamshala
Umpires: Vineet Kulkarni (Ind) and Chettithody Shamshuddin (Ind)
Player of the match: JP Duminy (SA)

- South Africa won the toss and elected to field.
- Sreenath Aravind (Ind) made his T20I debut.
- Virat Kohli (Ind) became the fastest batsman and also the first Indian batsman to reach 1,000 runs in Twenty20 Internationals.
- Rohit Sharma scored his first century in T20Is and became the first Indian batsman to hit a T20 international century in a losing cause.

=== 2nd T20I ===
5 October
Scorecard

India; 92 (17.2 overs)	v	South Africa; 96/4 (17.1 overs)
Rohit Sharma 22 (24); Suresh Raina 22 (24); Albie Morkel 3/12 (4 overs)		JP Duminy 30* (39); Ravichandran Ashwin 3/24 (4 overs)

South Africa won by 6 wickets
Barabati Stadium, Cuttack
Attendance: 44,790
Umpires: C. K. Nandan (Ind) and Chettithody Shamshuddin (Ind)
Player of the match: Albie Morkel (SA)

- South Africa won the toss and elected to field.
- The crowd started throwing bottles onto the ground during the South African innings and play was held up twice for a total of 51 minutes.
- Albie Morkel (SA) and Mohit Sharma (Ind) played their last T20I.

=== 3rd T20I ===
8 October
Scorecard

India	v	South Africa

Match abandoned
Eden Gardens, Kolkata
Umpires: Anil Chaudhary (Ind) and Vineet Kulkarni (Ind)

- No toss.
- The start of the match had to be delayed due to a wet outfield after a spell of localised rain.
- After a final inspection at 21:30 the match was abandoned without a ball bowled.

== ODI series ==
=== 1st ODI ===
11 October
09:00
Scorecard

South Africa; 303/5 (50 overs)	v	India; 298/7 (50 overs)
AB de Villiers 104* (73); Amit Mishra 2/47 (10 overs)		Rohit Sharma 150 (133); Imran Tahir 2/57 (10 overs)

South Africa won by 5 runs
Green Park Stadium, Kanpur
Umpires: Aleem Dar (Pak) and Vineet Kulkarni (Ind)
Player of the match: AB de Villiers (SA)

- South Africa won the toss and elected to bat.
- Stuart Binny (Ind) played his last ODI.

South Africa won the toss and chose to bat first reaching 5/303 in its innings. Three of its top four batsmen — Hashim Amla (37), Faf du Plessis (62) and AB de Villiers — passed thirty runs setting a strong platform, with the latter putting on 65 runs for the sixth wicket Farhaan Behardien (35 off 19). De Villiers finished unbeaten on 104 off 73 balls, getting to his 21st hundred with a six off the last ball of the innings.

India's reply began strongly before Shikhar Dhawan lost his wicket in the eighth over. Rohit Sharma (150 off 133 balls) and Ajinkya Rahane (60 off 82 balls) put on 149 runs for the second wicket, before the latter was dismissed in the 34th over. Wickets fell at regular intervals henceforth, and India finished five runs short of the target at 7/298 after 50 overs.

=== 2nd ODI ===
14 October
13:30 (D/N)
Scorecard

India; 247/9 (50 overs)	v	South Africa; 225 (43.4 overs)
MS Dhoni 92* (86); Dale Steyn 3/49 (10 overs)		Faf du Plessis 51 (56); Axar Patel 3/39 (10 overs)

India won by 22 runs
Holkar Stadium, Indore
Attendance: 26,832
Umpires: Aleem Dar (Pak) and Vineet Kulkarni (Ind)
Player of the match: MS Dhoni (Ind)

- India won the toss and elected to bat.

Opting to bat first after winning to toss, India got off to a poor start losing Rohit Sharma in the second over. After Shikhar Dhawan was dismissed in the 13th over, wickets kept falling at regular intervals at the other end of MS Dhoni, who finished unbeaten at 92 off 86 balls. With Ajinkya Rahane, the only other batsmen with a half-century (51), India finished its innings at 9/247.

South Africa began its chase well and were placed comfortably at 3/139 after 25 overs. After two wickets fell off consecutive overs, in the 26th and 27th, the lower-middle order and tail failed to get runs. It lost wickets at regular intervals before being dismissed for 225 in the 44th of its innings, with Axar Patel finishing off with his career-best figures of 3/39, from his 10 overs.

=== 3rd ODI ===
18 October
13:30 (D/N)
Scorecard

South Africa; 270/7 (50 overs)	v	India; 252/6 (50 overs)
Quinton de Kock 103 (118); Mohit Sharma 2/62 (9 overs)		Virat Kohli 77 (99); Morne Morkel 4/39 (10 overs)

South Africa won by 18 runs
Saurashtra Cricket Association Stadium, Rajkot
Umpires: Aleem Dar (Pak) and Chettithody Shamshuddin (Ind)
Player of the match: Morne Morkel (SA)

- South Africa won the toss and elected to bat.

South Africa won the toss and chose to bat first. David Miller was sent to open the innings for the first time in the series with Quinton de Kock, who put on 72 runs together. de Kock put on 118 runs together with Faf du Plessis (60 off 63 balls), on course, reaching his hundred off 114 balls. The team finished with 7/270 after 50 overs.

India, chasing 271, began well before losing Shikhar Dhawan in the 11th over. Virat Kohli (77 off 99) batted in two notable partnerships — with Rohit Sharma (65 off 74) for the second wicket and MS Dhoni (47 off 61) for the third wicket. Morne Morkel (4/39 off 10 overs) picked up the wickets of Dhoni and Kohli in his 9th and 10th overs, as India's middle order fell, before finishing off at 6/252 after 50 overs.

=== 4th ODI ===
22 October
Scorecard

India; 299/8 (50 overs)	v	South Africa; 264/9 (50 overs)
Virat Kohli 138 (140); Kagiso Rabada 3/54 (10 overs)		AB de Villiers 112 (107); Bhuvneshwar Kumar 3/68 (10 overs)

India won by 35 runs
M. A. Chidambaram Stadium, Chennai
Umpires: Sundaram Ravi (Ind) and Chettithody Shamshuddin (Ind)
Player of the match: Virat Kohli (Ind)

- India won the toss and elected to bat.

India won the toss, chose to bat first compiled a total of 299 losing 8 wickets. Rohit Sharma's dismissal in the fifth over brought Virat Kohli to the crease, who batted in two century partnerships. He put on 104 runs with Ajinkya Rahane (45 off 53 balls) for the third wicket and 127 with Suresh Raina (53 off 52 balls) for the fourth wicket. Kohli finished with 138 off 140 balls before being dismissed in the 49th over by Kagiso Rabada, who finished with figures off 3/54 off his 10 overs.

Chasing 300, South Africa lost early wickets, and then at regular intervals, losing 3 wickets for 32 runs between the 10th and 20th over. AB de Villiers came to the crease on Faf du Plessis's dismissal in the 15th over, and brought his hundred up off 98 balls, with a six in the 43rd over. Losing wickets at the other end at regular intervals, his partnership with Farhaan Behardien of 56 runs was the highest of the South African innings. They finished 9/264 in the 50 overs. With his hundred, his 22nd, de Villiers went past Herschelle Gibbs and Hashim Amla as the most hundreds by a South African batsman.

=== 5th ODI ===
25 October
Scorecard

South Africa; 438/4 (50 overs)	v	India; 224 (35.5 overs)
Faf du Plessis 133 (115); Suresh Raina 1/19 (3 overs)		Ajinkya Rahane 87 (58); Kagiso Rabada 4/41 (6.5 overs)

South Africa won by 214 runs
Wankhede Stadium, Mumbai
Umpires: Anil Chaudhary (Ind) and Kumar Dharmasena (SL)
Player of the match: Quinton de Kock (SA)

- South Africa won the toss and elected to bat.
- Harbhajan Singh and Mohit Sharma (Ind) played their last ODI.

South Africa won the toss and chose to bat first on a flat pitch. It lost its first wicket with Hashim Amla getting dismissed for 23 in the fourth over. Quinton de Kock made his second hundred of the series, coming off 78 balls and put on 154 runs with Faf du Plessis for the second wicket before losing his wicket in the 27th over. du Plessis got his hundred as well off 105 balls before being retiring due to cramps, after scoring 133 from 115 balls. AB de Villiers batted on and reached his hundred off 57 balls and was dismissed at 119 off 61 balls, before the team completed its innings at 4/438.

Chasing 439, India lost its first wicket in the fifth over and second in the eighth over, before Shikhar Dhawan (60 off 59) and Ajinkya Rahane (87 off 58) put on 112 runs for the third wicket. Wickets continued to fall henceforth, before the team was dismissed in the 36th over for 224.

Many records were equaled or broken on course of the match. South Africa's total of 438 was the joint third-highest in ODIs. It was only the second time that three batsmen from the same team scored individual centuries in an ODI innings. Bhuvneshwar Kumar's concession of 106 runs off his ten overs was the second-highest in an ODI. Hashim Amla became the fastest to reach 6,000 runs in ODIs, in 123 innings.

== Test series ==
=== 1st Test ===
5–9 November
Scorecard

India	v	South Africa
201 (68 overs); Murali Vijay 75 (136); Dean Elgar 4/22 (8 overs)		184 (68 overs); AB de Villiers 63 (83); Ravichandran Ashwin 5/51 (24 overs)
200 (75.3 overs); Cheteshwar Pujara 77 (153); Imran Tahir 4/48 (16.3 overs)		109 (39.5 overs); Stiaan van Zyl 36 (82); Ravindra Jadeja 5/21 (11.5 overs)

India won by 108 runs
Punjab Cricket Association IS Bindra Stadium, Mohali
Umpires: Kumar Dharmasena (SL) and Richard Kettleborough (Eng)
Player of the match: Ravindra Jadeja (Ind)

- India won the toss and elected to bat.
- Kagiso Rabada (SA) made his Test debut.

On a pitch which looked heavily in favour of spinners, Virat Kohli won the toss and India elected to bat. Despite a good start and base given by Murali Vijay and Cheteshwar Pujara, India were bowled out for 201 in their 1st innings. However, the Indian spinners stuck to make sure that South Africa, despite AB de Villiers's 63, conceded a lead of 17 runs. India again had a strong foundation laid by Vijay and Pujara after Shikhar Dhawan picked up a pair. But a collapse of 38/8 meant that South Africa needed 218 to win the Test. The Indian spinners led by Ravichandran Ashwin and Ravindra Jadeja bowled South Africa out for 109 to hand India a 108 run victory. The match was the fourth consecutive match in India which finished within three days.

=== 2nd Test ===
14–18 November
Scorecard

South Africa	v	India
214 (59 overs); AB de Villiers 85 (105); Ravindra Jadeja 4/50 (16 overs)		80/0 (22 overs); Shikhar Dhawan 45* (62)

Match drawn
M. Chinnaswamy Stadium, Bengaluru
Umpires: Ian Gould (Eng) and Richard Kettleborough (Eng)

- India won the toss and elected to field.
- No play was possible on Day 2, 3, 4 and 5 due to rain.
- AB de Villiers played his 100th Test.
- This was the ninth-shortest non-abandoned Test match.

The 2nd Test started with Indian captain Virat Kohli's surprise decision to bowl first. India included Stuart Binny and Ishant Sharma in place of Amit Mishra and Umesh Yadav. The Indian spinners, Ravichandran Ashwin and Ravindra Jadeja, took 8 wickets between them to dismiss South Africa for 214. Indian openers Murli Vijay and Shikhar Dhawan started positively and at the end of Day 1 India was in a strong position. However, strong and persistent rain on next 4 days meant that the match ended in a draw without any further play.

=== 3rd Test ===
25–29 November
Scorecard

India	v	South Africa
215 (78.2 overs); Murali Vijay 40 (84); Simon Harmer 4/78 (27.2 overs)		79 (33.1 overs); JP Duminy 35 (65); Ravichandran Ashwin 5/32 (16.1 overs)
173 (46.3 overs); Shikhar Dhawan 39 (78); Imran Tahir 5/38 (11.3 overs)		185 (89.5 overs); Faf du Plessis 39 (152); Ravichandran Ashwin 7/66 (29.5 overs)

India won by 124 runs
Vidarbha Cricket Association Stadium, Nagpur
Umpires: Ian Gould (Eng) and Bruce Oxenford (Aus)
Player of the match: Ravichandran Ashwin (Ind)

- India won the toss and elected to bat.
- South Africa's score of 79 all out is the lowest total against India in Tests.

India batted first and despite a strong start, a middle-order collapse meant India were all out for 215. The day ended with Dean Elgar and Hashim Amla batting. The first session on day 2 changed the game decisively in India's favour after South Africa were reduced to 17/5. Despite a counter-attacking innings from JP Duminy, India bowled them out for 79. The Indian 2nd innings was a repeat of their 1st innings with India suffering a middle-order collapse to be all out for 173, setting South Africa a target of 310 runs. The 2nd day ended with Dean Elgar and Hashim Amla batting. The 3rd day of the match was the final day as South Africa, despite a long partnership from captain Amla and Faf du Plessis were dismissed for 185 with Ravichandran Ashwin taking seven wickets. The pitch for the match was heavily criticized for offering extreme turn and variable bounce. The pitch was later rated as being poor by the ICC.

=== 4th Test ===
3–7 December
Scorecard

India	v	South Africa
334 (117.5 overs); Ajinkya Rahane 127 (215); Kyle Abbott 5/40 (24.5 overs)		121 (49.3 overs); AB de Villiers 42 (78); Ravindra Jadeja 5/30 (12 overs)
267/5d (100.1 overs); Ajinkya Rahane 100* (206); Morne Morkel 3/51 (21 overs)		143 (143.1 overs); AB de Villiers 43 (297); Ravichandran Ashwin 5/61 (49.1 overs)

India won by 337 runs
Feroz Shah Kotla Ground, New Delhi
Umpires: Kumar Dharmasena (SL) and Bruce Oxenford (Aus)
Player of the match: Ajinkya Rahane (Ind)

- India won the toss and elected to bat.
- Ajinkya Rahane (Ind) scored his first century on home soil and also became the first batsman to score a century in this Test series.
- Ajinkya Rahane also became only the 5th Indian batsman, after Vijay Hazare, Sunil Gavaskar, Rahul Dravid & Virat Kohli, to score centuries in both innings of a Test match, and the 81st batsman overall to achieve the feat.
- South Africa's second innings had the second lowest run rate in Test history for a completed innings.
- This was India's biggest win in Tests in terms of runs.

The fourth and final Test of the series was the only one which went beyond the third day. India again won the toss and chose to bat but a familiar batting collapse took place. However, a 98 run partnership between Ajinkya Rahane and Ravichandran Ashwin resulted in the first 300 run innings of the series. Rahane scored the first century of the series as well. South Africa's reply was a repeat of their earlier batting collapses, with batsmen after batsmen falling to spin bowling. India in their 2nd innings on back of second century for Rahane and a fighting 88 from captain Virat Kohli, declared at 267 to set South Africa a target of 481. However, a marathon blockathon from Hashim Amla, AB de Villiers, Faf du Plessis and Temba Bavuma could not help South Africa, as India won by 337 runs in the final session of the series. Rahane for his two centuries was named the man of the match, while Ashwin's 31 wickets made him the man of the series. Rahane became only the 5th Indian batsmen to score two centuries in a match while Ashwin's 31 wickets were the second highest for an Indian bowler behind Harbhajan Singh's 32 wickets in the 2001 series against Australia.

== Anti-Pakistan protests at Mumbai ==
On the morning of 19 October, BCCI president Shashank Manohar and PCB chairman Shaharyar Khan were to discuss a proposed India-Pakistan series in December. Just before the meeting, a group of 50 workers from the Shiv Sena, a political party, stormed into the BCCI headquarters in Mumbai, shouting anti-Pakistan slogans and demanding the cancellation of the series. They also threatened to stop Aleem Dar from officiating in the Mumbai ODI.

Aleem Dar, a member of the elite panel of ICC umpires, had officiated in the first three ODIs, and was also scheduled to umpire in the fourth and fifth ODIs, in Chennai and Mumbai. In response to the above incident ICC decided to withdraw Dar from the last two ODIs. Wasim Akram and Shoaib Akhtar, a part of the commentary team, decided to leave India before the fifth ODI at Mumbai.
