= Chris Lewis (cricketer) =

English cricketer

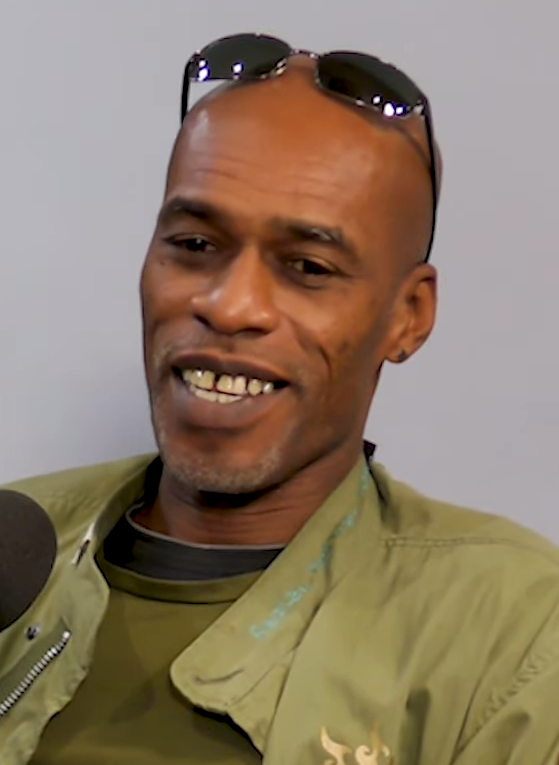
- Lewis in 2021

Personal information
- Full name: Clairmonte Christopher Lewis
- Born: 14 February 1968 (age 58); Georgetown, Demerara, Guyana
- Nickname: Carl
- Height: 188 cm (6 ft 2 in)
- Batting: Right-handed
- Bowling: Right arm fast-medium
- Role: Bowling all rounder

International information
- National side: England (1990 - 1998)
- Test debut (cap 544): 5 July 1990 v New Zealand
- Last Test: 26 August 1996 v Pakistan
- ODI debut (cap 106): 14 February 1990 v West Indies
- Last ODI: 23 May 1998 v South Africa

Domestic team information
- Years: Team
- 1987–1991: Leicestershire
- 1992–1995: Nottinghamshire
- 1996–1997: Surrey
- 1998–2000: Leicestershire
- 2008: Surrey

Career statistics
Competition	Tests	ODI	FC	LA
Matches	32	53	189	266
Runs scored	1,105	374	7,406	3,959
Batting average	23.02	14.38	30.73	24.59
100s/50s	1/4	0/0	9/34	1/14
Top score	117	33	247	116*
Balls bowled	6,852	2,625	32,004	11,846
Wickets	93	66	543	312
Bowling average	37.52	29.42	29.88	26.38
5 wickets in innings	3	0	20	2
10 wickets in match	0	0	3	0
Best bowling	6/111	4/30	6/22	5/19
Catches/stumpings	25/–	20/–	154/–	104/–
Medal record
Men's Cricket
Representing England
ICC Cricket World Cup
Runner-up	1992 Australia and New Zealand
- Source: Cricinfo, 9 December 2008

Clairmonte Christopher Lewis (born 14 February 1968) is an English former cricketer, who played for Nottinghamshire, Surrey and Leicestershire in the 1990s. He played in 32 Test matches and 53 One Day Internationals (ODIs) for England between 1990 and 1998. He was a part of the English squad which finished as runners-up at the 1992 Cricket World Cup.

Lewis was regarded as an aggressive lower-order batsman, fine fast-medium bowler and an able all-round fielder. He was regarded as a colourful player of the game, who never quite lived up to his early potential.

== International career ==
Lewis was drafted into the England squad to tour the West Indies in 1990 when Ricardo Ellcock pulled out through injury, making his one-day international debut during the tour. He made his Test debut the following summer against New Zealand.

He pulled out of England's disappointing tour of Australia the following winter after only one Test, but made an instant impact on his return to the Test team against the West Indies at Birmingham in 1991, taking 6 for 111 (which remained his best Test bowling figures) and scoring 65 (his first Test half-century) batting at no.10. That winter he helped England to a series victory in New Zealand, scoring 70 in the first Test, and taking 5 for 31 in the second. He then helped England to the final of 1992 Cricket World Cup, highlights coming when he won the man of the match awards in wins against the West Indies (where his wickets included Brian Lara), and Sri Lanka, where he took his best one-day international bowling, 4 for 30. Only player of the tournament Martin Crowe won more man of the match awards in the tournament. However, England lost the final, Lewis being dismissed first-ball by Wasim Akram.

His first Test century, in Madras on the occasion of his 25th birthday, on England's 1993 tour of India, gave hope for a bright international future. However England lost all their four Tests that winter, Lewis was dropped after the Lord's test against Australia in 1993, and this remained his only Test century.

Lewis was labelled "The Prat without a Hat" by The Sun, after he was forced to pull out of the first match of England's tour of the West Indies in 1994 with sunstroke after enlisting Devon Malcolm's help to shave his head to raise money for Children in Need, and then not wearing any protection. According to Martin Williamson, this Sun headline "came to haunt Lewis for the remainder of his career". Nonetheless, uniquely among England's bowlers on the tour he did appear in all five matches in the Test series against the West Indies, taking seven wickets to bowl England to the brink of a winning position in the third Test at Trinidad before England's batsmen collapsed to a devastating spell from Curtly Ambrose. To Lewis fell the dubious honour of bowling when Lara broke Garfield Sobers' record for the highest individual Test score in the final Test of the series at Antigua, although Lewis also made an unbeaten 75 as England drew the match. However, he was then dropped from the Test team, though continuing to appear in some one-day internationals and featuring in the England team which won the Hong Kong Sixes in 1994. He was recalled to the Test team as an injury replacement the following winter during the 1994-95 Ashes, taking 4 for 24 as England won an unexpected victory in the fourth Test at Adelaide, but after the next Test was dropped again.

He was recalled for the Birmingham test in 1996, taking his third Test five-wicket haul as England beat India, but was dropped again at the end of the summer, and thereafter only played two more one-day internationals. His international career ended in 1998.

In the run-up to the 1999 Cricket World Cup, England national coach David Lloyd and captain Alec Stewart requested Lewis's inclusion in the team owing to his skill with the new ball, but were refused permission to choose him by the selectors, due to concerns about Lewis's behaviour.

== Domestic career ==
Lewis had a nomadic county career, starting with Leicestershire before moving to Nottinghamshire. In 1996 he moved to Surrey, and in 1998 returned to Leicestershire. Highlights included winning the 1997 Benson & Hedges Cup with Surrey, and winning the 1998 County Championship with Leicestershire. During the latter campaign, he captained Leicestershire in a number of their matches.

Lewis always felt he was driven out of county cricket after alleging that three England teammates had taken bribes to throw matches (a charge that was never substantiated).

In 2006, he captained Clifton Cricket Club, in the Central Lancashire Cricket League, where he opened the batting and the bowling. In his spare time, he also coached children in Berkshire.

He played four games for Stockton in the Newcastle District Cricket Association in 2007/08.

In 2008, Lewis re-signed for Twenty20 matches for Surrey, in light of his bowling experience. However, his comeback was short and unsuccessful. He played one Friends Provident Trophy game, in which he conceded 51 runs in six overs, and one Twenty20 match. He took no wickets in either.

== Post-Retirement Life ==
Following his retirement, Lewis worked as a cricket coach, and also worked for the local council in Nottinghamshire.

On 8 December 2008, Lewis was arrested at Gatwick Airport on suspicion of smuggling 3.37 kilograms of liquid cocaine, with a street value of about £140,000, into the United Kingdom on a flight from Saint Lucia. Lewis claimed that he was returning from holiday in St Lucia and that the drugs had been planted in his luggage by a third party. After a trial at Croydon Crown Court, on 20 May 2009 Lewis and his accomplice, basketball player Chad Kirnon, were found guilty and sentenced to 13 years in prison. He was released in June 2015 after serving six years of his sentence at HMP High Down.

Following his release, Lewis worked with the PCA, teaching players to plan for the future. He released a biography about his experiences (Crazy: My Road to Redemption), and was also the subject of a play (The Long Walk Back) about his time in prison. Lewis also works as a motivational speaker.
