= Indian cricket team in England in 1996 =

International cricket tour

	India	England
- Dates: 5 May – 9 July 1996
Captains	Mohammad Azharuddin	Michael Atherton

Test series
- Result: England won the 3-match series 1–0
Most runs	Sachin Tendulkar (428)	Nasser Hussain (318)
Most wickets	Venkatesh Prasad (16)	Chris Lewis (15)
- Player of the series: Sourav Ganguly (Ind) and Nasser Hussain (Eng)

One Day International series
- Results: England won the 3-match series 2–0
Most runs	Mohammad Azharuddin (128)	Ali Brown (155)
Most wickets	Venkatesh Prasad (5)	Dominic Cork (5)
- Player of the series: Mohammad Azharuddin (Ind) and Chris Lewis (Eng)

The Indian cricket team toured England in the 1996 cricket season. They played a total of eighteen matches, including three Tests and three One Day Internationals (ODIs) against England. In the Tests and ODIs, India were captained by Mohammad Azharuddin, while Michael Atherton captained England.

This tour saw Sourav Ganguly, Rahul Dravid and Venkatesh Prasad make their Test debuts. Prasad made his debut in the 1st Test at Edgbaston, taking six wickets in this match and ultimately finishing as the leading wicket-taker in the Test series with 16. Ganguly and Dravid made their debuts in the 2nd Test at Lord's, scoring 131 and 95 respectively; both would go on to become mainstays of the Indian batting as well as national captains. The team also included established players such as Azharuddin, Sachin Tendulkar, Anil Kumble, Javagal Srinath, Sanjay Manjrekar and Nayan Mongia.

Nonetheless, the tour was a disaster for India. The team lost the Test series 1–0 (with the last two matches drawn), and the ODI series 2–0 (with no result in the first match due to rain). The rest of the tour saw victories in a single-innings match against the Duke of Norfolk's XI and limited-overs matches against an England National Cricket Association XI and Middlesex, but also defeats in a limited-overs match against Northamptonshire and a first-class match against Derbyshire. The tour was also marred by a spat between Azharuddin and opener Navjot Singh Sidhu, which resulted in the latter walking out of the tour after the 2nd ODI. Following the tour, Azharuddin, who was also facing personal problems at the time, was sacked as captain.

== Tour matches ==
=== Three-day: British Universities v Indians ===
26–28 June 1996
Scorecard

Indians	v	British Universities
457/6d (110 overs); Ajay Jadeja 112*; Kervin Marc 3/91 (25 overs)		217 (74.5 overs); Gul Khan 56; Narendra Hirwani 6/60 (29.5 overs)
231/3d (68 overs); Rahul Dravid 101*; Scott Boswell 1/21 (8 overs)

Match drawn
Fenner's, Cambridge
Umpires: Nigel Cowley and John Harris

- Indians won the toss and elected to bat.

=== Three-day: Hampshire v Indians ===
29 June - 01 July 1996
Scorecard

Indians	v	Hampshire
362/5d (86.2 overs); Sourav Ganguly 100*; Kevan James 5/74 (25 overs)		458/9 (124 overs); Kevan James 103; Salil Ankola 4/120 (30 overs)

Match drawn
County Ground, Southampton
Umpires: John Hampshire and Kevin Lyons

- Hampshire won the toss and elected to field
- Kevan James took four wickets (those of Vikram Rathour, Sachin Tendulkar, Rahul Dravid and Sanjay Manjrekar) in four balls then scored a century in the same match, a unique feat in first-class cricket.

== Test series ==
=== 1st Test ===
6–9 June 1996
Scorecard

India	v	England
214 (69.1 overs); Javagal Srinath 52 (65); Dominic Cork 4/61 (20.1 overs)		313 (90.2 overs); Nasser Hussain 128 (227); Venkatesh Prasad 4/71 (28 overs)
219 (70.4 overs); Sachin Tendulkar 122 (177); Chris Lewis 5/72 (22.4 overs)		121/2 (33.5 overs); Michael Atherton 53* (100); Venkatesh Prasad 2/50 (14 overs)

England won by 8 wickets
Edgbaston Cricket Ground, Birmingham
Umpires: Darrell Hair (Aus) and David Shepherd (Eng)
Player of the match: Nasser Hussain (Eng)

- India won the toss and elected to bat.
- Ronnie Irani, Alan Mullally, Min Patel (all Eng), Sunil Joshi, Paras Mhambrey, Venkatesh Prasad and Vikram Rathour (all Ind) made their Test debuts.

=== 2nd Test ===
20–24 June 1996
Scorecard

England	v	India
344 (130.3 overs); Jack Russell 124 (261); Venkatesh Prasad 5/76 (33.3 overs)		429 (169.3 overs); Sourav Ganguly 131 (301); Alan Mullally 3/71 (39 overs)
278/9d (121 overs); Alec Stewart 66 (136); Anil Kumble 3/90 (51 overs)

Match drawn
Lord's Cricket Ground, London
Umpires: Dickie Bird (Eng) and Darrell Hair (Aus)
Player of the match: Jack Russell (Eng)

- India won the toss and elected to field.
- Rahul Dravid and Sourav Ganguly (both Ind) made their Test debuts. Umpire Dickie Bird stood in his 66th and final Test match.

=== 3rd Test ===
4–9 July 1996
Scorecard

India	v	England
521 (167 overs); Sachin Tendulkar 177 (360); Chris Lewis 3/89 (37 overs)		564 (198.5 overs); Michael Atherton 160 (376); Sourav Ganguly 3/71 (19.5 overs)
211 (69 overs); Sachin Tendulkar 74 (97); Mark Ealham 4/21 (14 overs)

Match drawn
Trent Bridge, Nottingham
Umpires: K. T. Francis (SL) and George Sharp (Eng)
Player of the match: Sourav Ganguly (Ind)

- India won the toss and elected to bat.
- Mark Ealham (Eng) made his Test debut.
- July 7 was taken as a rest day and is to date the last test match in England to feature a rest day.

== ODI series ==
=== 1st ODI ===
23–24 May 1996
Scorecard

England; 291/8 (50 overs)	v	India; 96/5 (17.1 overs)
Graeme Hick 91 (102); Anil Kumble 2/29 (10 overs)		Sachin Tendulkar 30 (19); Chris Lewis 4/40 (8.1 overs)

No result
The Oval, London
Umpires: Ray Julian (Eng) and Peter Willey (Eng)
Player of the match: Graeme Hick (Eng)

- England won the toss and elected to bat.
- Play was abandoned on the first day due to rain; no play was possible on the reserve day.
- Ali Brown, Mark Ealham, Ronnie Irani (all Eng) and Paras Mhambrey (Ind) made their ODI debuts.

=== 2nd ODI ===
25 May 1996
Scorecard

India; 158 (40.2 overs)	v	England; 162/4 (39.3 overs)
Mohammad Azharuddin 40 (68); Peter Martin 3/34 (8.2 overs)		Graham Thorpe 79* (118); Venkatesh Prasad 2/33 (9 overs)

England won by 6 wickets
Headingley Cricket Ground, Leeds
Umpires: Mervyn Kitchen (Eng) and Alan Whitehead (Eng)
Player of the match: Graham Thorpe (Eng)

- England won the toss and elected to field.
- Match reduced to 42 overs per side due to rain.

=== 3rd ODI ===
26–27 May 1996
Scorecard

India; 236/4 (50 overs)	v	England; 239/6 (48.5 overs)
Mohammad Azharuddin 73* (64); Graham Thorpe 2/15 (4 overs)		Ali Brown 118 (137); Venkatesh Prasad 2/26 (10 overs)

England won by 4 wickets
Old Trafford Cricket Ground, Manchester
Umpires: David Constant (Eng) and Allan Jones (Eng)
Player of the match: Ali Brown (Eng)

- India won the toss and elected to bat.
- Play was abandoned on the first day due to rain, with England 2/1 after 1 over.

== External sources ==
- CricketArchive – tour itineraries

== Annual reviews ==
- Playfair Cricket Annual 1997
- Wisden Cricketers' Almanack 1997
