= Indian cricket team in England in 2007 =

International cricket tour

	India	England
- Dates: 19 July – 8 September 2007
Captains	Rahul Dravid	Michael Vaughan (Tests); Paul Collingwood (ODIs)

Test series
- Result: India won the 3-match series 1–0
Most runs	Dinesh Karthik (263)	Kevin Pietersen (345)
Most wickets	Zaheer Khan (18)	James Anderson (14)
- Player of the series: Zaheer Khan (Ind); James Anderson (Eng)

One Day International series
- Results: England won the 7-match series 4–3
Most runs	Sachin Tendulkar (374)	Ian Bell (422)
Most wickets	Ajit Agarkar (7); R. P. Singh (7)	James Anderson (14)
- Player of the series: Ian Bell (Eng)

The India national cricket team toured England from 19 July to 8 September 2007. The tour included 3 Tests and 7 ODIs. During the Test series, the Pataudi Trophy, a prize commissioned by the MCC to commemorate the 75th anniversary of India's Test debut, was competed for. This was designed and created by Jocelyn Burton, Holborn, London.

In the Test series, India defeated England by 1–0 to win their maiden Pataudi Trophy. This was also their third and till date the last Test series victory on English soil. However, in the ODI series, England defeated India by 4–3.

== Squads ==
Tests		ODIs	
England	India	England	India
Michael Vaughan (c); James Anderson; Ian Bell; Stuart Broad; Paul Collingwood; Alastair Cook; ~~Steve Harmison~~; Matthew Hoggard; Monty Panesar; Kevin Pietersen; Matt Prior (wk); Ryan Sidebottom; Andrew Strauss; Chris Tremlett	Rahul Dravid (c); Sachin Tendulkar (vc); Ranadeb Bose; M. S. Dhoni (wk); Gautam Gambhir; Sourav Ganguly; Wasim Jaffer; Dinesh Karthik (wk); Zaheer Khan; Anil Kumble; VVS Laxman; Ramesh Powar; Ishant Sharma; R. P. Singh; Yuvraj Singh; Sreesanth	Paul Collingwood (c); James Anderson; Ian Bell; Ravi Bopara; Stuart Broad; Alastair Cook; Andrew Flintoff; Jon Lewis; Dimitri Mascarenhas; Monty Panesar; Kevin Pietersen; Matt Prior (wk); Owais Shah; Ryan Sidebottom; Chris Tremlett; Luke Wright	Rahul Dravid (c); M. S. Dhoni (vc, wk); Ajit Agarkar; Piyush Chawla; Gautam Gambhir; Sourav Ganguly; Dinesh Karthik (wk); Zaheer Khan; Munaf Patel; Ramesh Powar; Rohit Sharma; R. P. Singh; Yuvraj Singh; Sachin Tendulkar; Robin Uthappa

Steve Harmison was named in the England squad for the first Test but withdrew just a day later due to a hernia and underwent an operation to treat it, ruling him out for the entire series. Chris Tremlett was named as his replacement. Matthew Hoggard did not play in the first two Test matches against India after being sent to hospital following a back spasm.

With the resignation of Greg Chappell after the Cricket World Cup 2007 and Graham Ford declining the position of Indian coach, India entered the series without a coach. Virender Sehwag and Harbhajan Singh were not named in the Indian squad due to recent poor performances while Irfan Pathan and Munaf Patel were not fully fit.

== Tour matches ==
=== First-class: Sussex v Indians ===
7–10 July
Scorecard

Indians	v	Sussex
388/7d (130.5 overs); VVS Laxman 95 (178); Saqlain Mushtaq 3/71 (29.5 overs)		300/6d (85.1 overs); Andy Hodd 106* (165); Anil Kumble 3/66 (22 overs)
184/8d (51 overs); R. P. Singh 41* (46); Robin Martin-Jenkins 2/13 (7 overs)		190/9 (55 overs); Richard Montgomerie 59 (83); Anil Kumble 3/57 (20 overs)

Match drawn
County Ground, Hove
Umpires: Graham Burgess (Eng) and Keith Coburn (Eng)

- Indians won the toss and elected to bat.
- Michael Thornely (Sussex) made his first-class debut.

=== First-class: England Lions v Indians ===
13–15 July
Scorecard

England Lions	v	Indians
413/8d (97 overs); Tim Bresnan 126* (166); Zaheer Khan 3/119 (22 overs)		383 (86.4 overs); Sachin Tendulkar 171 (236); Stuart Broad 5/76 (19.4 overs)
227/2d (59 overs); Andrew Strauss 80 (103); Ramesh Powar 1/49 (13 overs)		91/1 (20 overs); Dinesh Karthik 51 (45); Adil Rashid 1/24 (6 overs)

Match drawn
County Ground, Chelmsford
Umpires: Martin Bodenham (Eng) and Barry Dudleston (Eng)

- England Lions won the toss and elected to bat.

=== First-class: Indians v Sri Lanka A ===
3–5 August
Scorecard

Sri Lanka A	v	Indians
266 (76.2 overs); Thilan Samaraweera 75 (100); Ranadeb Bose 5/51 (18.2 overs)		238/5d (68 overs); Rahul Dravid 67* (105); Rangana Herath 2/62 (18 overs)
265/7d (64 overs); Michael Vandort 117 (186); Ramesh Powar 2/37 (12 overs)		187/6 (55 overs); Wasim Jaffer 55 (84); Dammika Prasad 2/34 (12 overs)

Match drawn
Grace Road, Leicester
Umpires: Nick Cook (Eng) and Barrie Leadbeater (Eng)

- Sri Lanka A won the toss and elected to bat.

=== List A: England Lions v Indians ===
18 August
Scorecard

England Lions; 296/8 (50 overs)	v	Indians; 32/0 (6.2 overs)
Vikram Solanki 60 (65); Ramesh Powar 3/52 (10 overs)		Sourav Ganguly 18* (29)

No result
County Ground, Northampton
Umpires: Neil Bainton (Eng) and Richard Illingworth (Eng)

- Indians won the toss and elected to field.
- No play was further possible due to rain.

== Test series ==
=== 1st Test ===
19–23 July 2007
Scorecard

England	v	India
298 (91.2 overs); Andrew Strauss 96 (186); Sreesanth 3/67 (22 overs)		201 (77.4 overs); Wasim Jaffer 58 (156); James Anderson 5/42 (24.2 overs)
282 (79 overs); Kevin Pietersen 134 (213); R. P. Singh 5/59 (16.3 overs)		282/9 (96 overs); Mahendra Singh Dhoni 76* (159); Chris Tremlett 3/52 (21 overs)

Match drawn
Lord's, London
Umpires: Steve Bucknor (WI) and Simon Taufel (Aus)
Player of the match: Kevin Pietersen (Eng)

- England won the toss and elected to bat.
- Chris Tremlett (Eng) made his Test debut.
- Play on Day 1 was reduced to 81 overs due to bad light.
- Play on Day 2 was reduced to 68 overs due to rain.
- Play on Day 3 was reduced to 45 overs due to rain.
- Play on Day 5 was reduced to 47 overs due to bad light and rain.

Day One

The first Test match at Lord's saw Chris Tremlett make his England Test debut. Michael Vaughan won the toss and chose to bat first. Andrew Strauss and Alastair Cook took advantage of average Indian bowling scoring 40 runs after only 5 overs putting on 76 before Sourav Ganguly made the break through dismissing Cook on 36 lbw from his fourth ball of the match. No further wickets fell in the morning session although Strauss was dropped on 43 by Dinesh Karthik at the stroke of lunch.

Michael Vaughan and Strauss scored a 142 run second wicket partnership that would prove to be crucial in the match. Strauss was dismissed on 96 edging a slider from Anil Kumble. England in a seemingly strong position of 252/2 lost two quick wickets of Michael Vaughan and Paul Collingwood. Vaughan edged an R. P. Singh delivery straight to Dhoni while Paul Collingwood went for his first Test duck being deceived by a googly from Kumble and was trapped lbw reducing England to 255/4. This wicket meant Anil Kumble overtook Shane Warne's Test record of 138 lbw wickets. Ryan Sidebottom joined Kevin Pietersen as nightwatchman and survived 5 deliveries before the day ended with England on 268/4.

Day Two

Heavy rain in the morning and poor weather forecasts made any play on the second day a remote possibility but rain stopped at around 13:00 BST allowing play to resume at 13:50 BST. The restart saw the Indian attack dismiss England for 298 with the final 26 runs costing 6 wickets. Chris Tremlett and Monty Panesar both went for ducks while Sidebottom and Matt Prior went on 1.

There was controversial moment in this session when Pietersen began walking when he edged a ball to Dhoni and appeared to be out caught. He turned back however when he saw his teammates at the pavilion waving him to go back when they saw Steve Bucknor telling Simon Taufel he thought the ball had not carried. TV replays showed the ball did not carry and Pietersen was given not out by the third umpire Ian Gould. This decision did not cost India however as Pietersen did not score any runs before being caught.

Dinesh Karthik was dismissed early on lbw and India could have been 16/2 had Prior not drop Wasim Jaffer in the second over. Rahul Dravid could not make a start and was removed cutting an outswinger to Prior. Sachin Tendulkar consolidated India's innings however scoring 80 runs with Jaffer before he was dismissed on 37. India lost one further wicket of Jaffer (which was Tremlett first Test wicket) and closed the day on 145/4.

Day Three

The day began in similar vein to the previous one with India losing their remaining 6 wickets in the space of 15 overs closing their innings on 201. James Anderson got his career best bowling figures of 5/42 in this innings. Andrew Strauss and Alastair Cook negotiated the final two overs of the session before lunch was taken.

Play did not resume until 15:25 BST due to rain. At the restart Zaheer Khan left-handed swing troubled the opening batsmen with Strauss and Cook going out in quick succession before play stopped. After the rain interruption Vaughan and Pietersen survived the final 35 minutes of the play to end the day on 77/2 leading the game by 174 runs.

Day Four

England scored 25 runs before Vaughan was clean bowled by R. P. Singh. Collingwood and Bell's wickets soon followed and England were 132/5. No further wickets fell in the morning session and England went into lunch at 161/5. The afternoon session started with Prior and Pietersen putting on 90 runs at a rate of 5 an over to swing the game in England's favour before Prior was eventually caught by Dhoni. Chris Tremlett completed his pair being bowled by Khan, becoming the first Englishman since 1999 to get a pair on debut. Pietersen struggled to protect the tail and England were dismissed for 282 before tea setting India a target of 380 runs for victory. Singh got his bowling figures of 5/59 in this innings.

In the final session of the day, India scored runs quickly, making 137 runs at a cost of 3 wickets. India lost the key wickets of Dravid and Tendulkar both out lbw. Going into a tense final day, all results were still possible.

Day Five

India lost two early wickets of Sourav Ganguly (lbw) and Karthik (caught) meaning that any chance of an Indian victory disappeared. Weather forecasts had predicted rain and it became a race against time for England to win the match before rain arrived while India would have to hold out for a draw. VVS Laxman and Dhoni produced a stand of 86 runs before Laxman was bowled by Tremlett.

This left Dhoni with the task of rear guard which was to protect the tail from the English attack. The next 3 wickets fell within 8 overs leaving India on 263/9. With light deteriorating Vaughan and Panesar bowled the final 7 overs of the match. Sreesanth survived a strong lbw appeal from Panesar before bad light forced tea to be taken early. Rain meant that there was no evening session and the Test ended in a draw. Pietersen was awarded man of the match for his (134) century.

=== 2nd Test ===
27–31 July 2007
Scorecard

England	v	India
198 (65.3 overs); Alastair Cook 43 (111); Zaheer Khan 4/59 (21 overs)		481 (158.5 overs); Sachin Tendulkar 91 (196); Monty Panesar 4/101 (33.5 overs)
355 (104 overs); Michael Vaughan 124 (193); Zaheer Khan 5/75 (27 overs)		73/3 (24.1 overs); Wasim Jaffer 22 (45); Chris Tremlett 3/12 (7.1 overs)

India won by 7 wickets
Trent Bridge, Nottingham
Umpires: Ian Howell (SA) and Simon Taufel (Aus)
Player of the match: Zaheer Khan (Ind)

- India won the toss and elected to field.
- Play on Day 1 was reduced to 55 overs.

Day One

India won the toss and chose to bowl on a pitch which was wet due to rainfall over the past few days. From then on, England were on the back foot and kept on losing wickets. India had an exceptional day with the ball. Alastair Cook scored 43 and became the youngest England batsman to cross 1500 test runs, before being dismissed lbw by Ganguly. Zaheer was the pick of the Indian Bowlers and took 3 wickets. The other Indian Bowlers responded well, too. England ended the day at 169–7 at Stumps on Day 1.

Day Two

England resumed at 169–7, were done for 198 at the 1st session itself and so, the useful landmark of 200 proved elusive to England. Cook was the top scorer for England with 43 and Khan was the pick of the bowlers whose spell read: 21-5-57-4. The Indians began their innings well with Jaffer and Karthik scoring half centuries and putting 147 runs for the 1st wicket before Jaffer was caught behind for 62. Wickets of Karthik(77) and Dravid(37) also fell but India moved to a safe position of 254–3 at Stumps on Day 2. Tendulkar scored his 11000th test run.

Day Three

India resumed at 254–3. Tendulkar, Ganguly and Laxman scored half centuries and were dismissed for 91, 79 and 54 respectively. India were eventually done for 481 with the lower order except Sreeshanth and Singh making some contributions with the bat, and England had a tough 16 overs to reckon with in this day. But this time, England Batsman showed some composure and were 43–0 at stumps on Day 3 with the openers Cook and Strauss scoring 17 and 21 respectively.

Day Four

England resumed at 43-0 but the breakthrough for India came in the 3rd over itself when Khan trapped Cook plumb in front for 23. Strauss scored fifty, but was dismissed by Khan due to a loose shot and Singh struck with the wickets of Peterson and Prior. Vaughan carried on to score a century and his 5000th test run to keep England in the hunt. But India opted for the new ball and Khan inflicted thunder-blows by dismissing both Vaughan and Bell. Collingwood was also dismissed by Khan after he scored a fifty. England were eventually bundled up for 355 which left India with 73 runs to win the match. India ended the day with 10–0 at stumps on day 4 but the day was about Zaheer Khan, whose spell of the second innings read: 27-10-75-5.

Day Five

India began the day with only 63 runs left to make in order to win the match. Wasim Jaffer and Dinesh Karthik began to added 22 runs the Indian score. The Indian team soon lost the wickets of Jaffer, Karthik and Sachin. Ganguly and Dravid made 2 and 11 runs respectively confirming the Indian win. Zaheer Khan was adjudged man of the match for his 9 wickets in the match.

=== 3rd Test ===
9–13 August 2007
Scorecard

India	v	England
664 (170 overs); Anil Kumble 110* (193); James Anderson 4/182 (40 overs)		345 (103.1 overs); Ian Bell 63 (96); Zaheer Khan 3/32 (22 overs)
180/6d (58 overs); Sourav Ganguly 57 (68); Paul Collingwood 2/24 (10 overs)		369/6 (110 overs); Kevin Pietersen 101 (159); Sreesanth 3/53 (21 overs)

Match drawn
The Oval, London
Umpires: Steve Bucknor (WI) and Ian Howell (SA)
Player of the match: Anil Kumble (Ind)

- India won the toss and elected to bat.
- Play on Day 4 was reduced to 86 overs due to rain.

India won the toss, and chose to bat first on a flat wicket which proved very good for batting. Both teams were unchanged again from the Trent Bridge Test, creating the rare scenario of both teams fielding the same 11 players per side for all matches of the series.

England's bowlers worked hard throughout days 1 and 2, but were unable to replicate the successes they had previously achieved against India's powerful batting line up. Dinesh Karthik continued his good form to score 91, and Rahul Dravid scored 55 before he was clean bowled by a good delivery from James Anderson. England's cause was not helped by dropped catches from the wicketkeeper Matt Prior – first off Sachin Tendulkar when he was on 20, and then VVS Laxman when he was on 41. Tendulkar went on to make 82, and Laxman 51. Prior also conceded five lots of four byes on day 1, though some of these might conceivably have been signalled wide.

India finished day 1 on 316/4, and accelerated their scoring significantly on day 2. Mahendra Singh Dhoni scored 92, and was only dismissed off the part-time spin of Kevin Pietersen after having hit two massive sixes and attempting a third. Then, veteran spinner Anil Kumble registered his maiden test century in his 118th match, which was a delightful moment for all followers of Indian cricket. Kumble would go unbeaten, finishing on 110 not out, and the lower order all contributed useful runs to help India compile an enormous score of 664. This total pretty much ensured that India could not lose the match, and would therefore win the series.

England came out to bat late on day 2, and lost the wicket of Andrew Strauss before the close. They continued to lose wickets regularly through day 3, with the shot selection of some of the middle order batsmen being called into question. Zaheer Khan, India's bowler of the series picked up three wickets and Kumble also took three. For England, Alastair Cook, Ian Bell and Paul Collingwood all scored in the 60s, but no one went on to make a big score – leaving England on 345 all out early on day 4 and facing the prospect of following on.

Rahul Dravid chose not to enforce the follow-on, however, a decision regarded as negative by many. However, there were concerns about Zaheer Khan who may have strained his thigh, and both India and Australia have been reluctant to enforce the follow-on since the incredible match in Kolkata in 2001 where India won the match having been forced to follow-on by Australia.

For a short period, Dravid's decision looked to be potentially dangerous as England captured three very early wickets to leave India on 11/3, with an overall lead of 330. Dravid himself then batted in a very defensive manner, in an innings where he scored 12 from 96 deliveries. At one point, he had only scored 2 from 52 balls. However, Sourav Ganguly batted aggressively at the other end, and Laxman and Dhoni also contributed to boost India's score, and allow Dravid to declare leaving England exactly 500 to win in 110 overs.

England survived until the end of day 4 without loss. For the most part, they batted sensibly throughout day 5 to reach 369/6 by the close of play and secure themselves a draw. However, there were still questions about the technique of some of the batsmen, with Michael Vaughan, Kevin Pietersen and Ian Bell all falling to slightly injudicious shots. Pietersen scored another test century, which was the main contributor to ensuring the draw by the close of play. Kumble was awarded man of the match.

India had won the series 1–0, and secured their first series victory in England since 1986. Overall, the series had been a very good one, with two evenly matched sides competing well. England were unlucky not to win the first test at Lords due to rain, although they had had their chances. India seized on the opportunities they created at Trent Bridge to take the lead, and then first and foremost batted England out of contention in the final test, which they did very effectively, with no intention of setting a real target.

== ODI series ==
=== 1st ODI ===
21 August 2007
Scorecard

England; 288/2 (50 overs)	v	India; 184 (50 overs)
Ian Bell 126* (118); Zaheer Khan 1/49 (10 overs)		Rahul Dravid 46 (72); James Anderson 4/23 (10 overs)

England won by 104 runs
Rose Bowl, Southampton
Umpires: Mark Benson (Eng) and Billy Doctrove (WI)
Player of the match: Ian Bell (Eng)

- India won the toss and elected to field.

Alastair Cook and Ian Bell both posted maiden ODI centuries, and James Anderson took three early wickets in India's chase to leave them on 34/4, and ensuring that the target of 289 was well out of their reach.

=== 2nd ODI ===
24 August 2007
Scorecard

India; 329/7 (50 overs)	v	England; 320/8 (50 overs)
Sachin Tendulkar 99 (112); Andrew Flintoff 5/56 (10 overs)		Ian Bell 64 (96); Piyush Chawla 3/60 (10 overs)

India won by 9 runs
County Ground, Bristol
Umpires: Billy Doctrove (WI) and Ian Gould (Eng)
Player of the match: Rahul Dravid (Ind)

- India won the toss and elected to bat.

=== 3rd ODI ===
27 August 2007
Scorecard

England; 281/8 (50 overs)	v	India; 239 (48.1 overs)
Ian Bell 79 (89); R. P. Singh 3/55 (9 overs)		Sourav Ganguly 72 (104); James Anderson 3/32 (9.1 overs)

England won by 42 runs
Edgbaston, Birmingham
Umpires: Mark Benson (Eng) and Billy Doctrove (WI)
Player of the match: Ian Bell (Eng)

- India won the toss and elected to field.

=== 4th ODI ===
30 August 2007
Scorecard

India; 212 (49.4 overs)	v	England; 213/7 (48 overs)
Yuvraj Singh 71 (104); Stuart Broad 4/51 (10 overs)		Paul Collingwood 47 (55); Ajit Agarkar 4/60 (10 overs)

England won by 3 wickets
Old Trafford, Manchester
Umpires: Aleem Dar (Pak) and Mark Benson (Eng)
Player of the match: Stuart Broad (Eng)

- India won the toss and elected to bat.

India's decision to bat first seemed to be a mistake after they were left 32/3 but Sachin Tendulkar's half century and small contributions later pushed India to 212.

This seemingly was enough for the touring side as England crashed to 0/1 and soon 35/3. By the time captain Paul Collingwood was run out, England needed 99 runs to win with all-rounder Ravi Bopara and bowler Stuart Broad to fend off the remaining 26 overs. Surprisingly the two put a record eight wicket partnership for England, the hosts taking the series 3–1 with a three-wicket victory and Broad picking up man of the match for his 45 not out and 4/51.

=== 5th ODI ===
2 September 2007
Scorecard

India; 324/6 (50 overs)	v	England; 242/8 (39 overs)
Yuvraj Singh 72 (57); Paul Collingwood 1/48 (10 overs)		Paul Collingwood 91* (71); Sourav Ganguly 2/26 (7 overs)

India won by 38 runs (D/L)
Headingley, Leeds
Umpires: Aleem Dar (Pak) and Nigel Llong (Eng)
Player of the match: Sourav Ganguly (Ind)

- England won the toss and elected to field.

=== 6th ODI ===
5 September 2007
Scorecard

England; 316/6 (50 overs)	v	India; 317/8 (49.4 overs)
Owais Shah 107* (95); Zaheer Khan 1/43 (10 Overs)		Sachin Tendulkar 94 (81); Stuart Broad 2/46 (9.4 overs)

India won by 2 wickets
The Oval, London
Umpires: Aleem Dar (Pak) and Peter Hartley (Eng)
Player of the match: Sachin Tendulkar (Ind)

- England won the toss and elected to bat.
- Luke Wright (Eng) made his ODI debut.
- Owais Shah (Eng) scored his first century in ODIs.

=== 7th ODI ===
8 September 2007
Scorecard

India; 187 (47.3 overs)	v	England; 188/3 (36.2 overs)
Mahendra Singh Dhoni 50 (72); Dimitri Mascarenhas 3/23 (10 overs)		Kevin Pietersen 71* (96); R. P. Singh 2/40 (7 overs)

England won by 7 wickets
Lord's, London
Umpires: Aleem Dar (Pak) and Ian Gould (Eng)
Player of the match: Kevin Pietersen (Eng)

- India won the toss and elected to bat.

== External sources ==
- CricketArchive
- ESPNcricinfo
- Cricbuzz
- BBC Sport
- Video highlights
- Ball by Ball Simulation with Text, Audio Commentary
