= Indian cricket team in England in 2014 =

International cricket tour

India in England in 2014
	India	England
- Dates: 22 June – 7 September 2014
Captains	MS Dhoni	Alastair Cook (Tests & ODIs)

Test series
- Result: England won the 5-match series 3–1
Most runs	Murali Vijay (402)	Joe Root (518)
Most wickets	Bhuvneshwar Kumar (19)	James Anderson (25)
- Player of the series: James Anderson (Eng); Bhuvneshwar Kumar (Ind)

One Day International series
- Results: India won the 5-match series 3–1
Most runs	Ajinkya Rahane (192)	Joe Root (163)
Most wickets	Mohammed Shami (8)	Chris Woakes (5)
- Player of the series: Suresh Raina (Ind)

Twenty20 International series
- Results: England won the 1-match series 1–0
Most runs	Virat Kohli (66)	Eoin Morgan (71)
Most wickets	Mohammed Shami (3)	Steven Finn (1); Moeen Ali (1); Harry Gurney (1); Chris Woakes (1)

The India national cricket team toured England from 22 June to 7 September 2014 for five-match series each of Test and One Day International (ODI) and one Twenty20 International.

England won the Test series 3–1 and received the Pataudi Trophy. This was the first time since 1959 that India had played five Test matches on an England tour. The third Test, held at the Rose Bowl in Southampton, was the first Test match played in England to start on a Sunday.

== Squads ==
Tests		ODIs		T20I	
England	India	England	India	England	India
Alastair Cook (c); Moeen Ali; James Anderson; Gary Ballance; Ian Bell; Stuart Broad; Jos Buttler (wk); Steven Finn; Chris Jordan; Liam Plunkett; Matt Prior (wk); Sam Robson; Joe Root; Ben Stokes; Chris Woakes; Simon Kerrigan	MS Dhoni (c & wk); Varun Aaron; Ravichandran Ashwin; Stuart Binny; Shikhar Dhawan; Gautam Gambhir; Ravindra Jadeja; Virat Kohli; Bhuvneshwar Kumar; Naman Ojha (wk); Ishwar Pandey; Cheteshwar Pujara; Ajinkya Rahane; Wriddhiman Saha (wk); Mohammed Shami; Ishant Sharma; Rohit Sharma; Pankaj Singh; Murali Vijay	Alastair Cook (c); Moeen Ali; James Anderson; Gary Ballance; Ian Bell; Jos Buttler (wk); Steven Finn; Harry Gurney; Alex Hales; Chris Jordan; Eoin Morgan; Joe Root; Ben Stokes; James Tredwell; Chris Woakes	MS Dhoni (c & wk); Virat Kohli (vc); Ravichandran Ashwin; Stuart Binny; Shikhar Dhawan; Mohit Sharma; Ravindra Jadeja; Ambati Rayudu; Bhuvneshwar Kumar; Suresh Raina; Umesh Yadav; Dhawal Kulkarni; Ajinkya Rahane; Sanju Samson (wk); Mohammed Shami; Karn Sharma; Rohit Sharma; Murali Vijay	Eoin Morgan (c); Moeen Ali; Ravi Bopara; Tim Bresnan; Jos Buttler (wk); Steven Finn; Harry Gurney; Alex Hales; Chris Jordan; Joe Root; Jason Roy; James Taylor; James Tredwell; Chris Woakes	MS Dhoni (c & wk); Virat Kohli (vc); Ravichandran Ashwin; Stuart Binny; Shikhar Dhawan; Mohit Sharma; Ravindra Jadeja; Ambati Rayudu; Bhuvneshwar Kumar; Suresh Raina; Umesh Yadav; Dhawal Kulkarni; Ajinkya Rahane; Sanju Samson (wk); Mohammed Shami; Karn Sharma

== Tour matches ==
=== Three-day: Leicestershire v Indians ===
26–28 June 2014
Scorecard

Indians	v	Leicestershire
333/4d (90 overs); Shikhar Dhawan 60* (100); Shiv Thakor 1/31 (10 overs)		349/5 (62 overs); Angus Robson 126 (146); Ishant Sharma 2/64 (9 overs)

Match drawn
Grace Road, Leicester
Umpires: Nigel Cowley (Eng) and Ben Debenham (Eng)

- Indians won the toss and elected to bat.
- No play was possible on day 2 due to rain.

=== Three-day: Derbyshire v Indians ===
1–3 July 2014
Scorecard

Derbyshire	v	Indians
326/5d (90 overs); Wes Durston 95 (90); Ravindra Jadeja 2/27 (11 overs)		341/6d (91 overs); Stuart Binny 81* (111); Ben Cotton 2/25 (15 overs)
156/3d (45 overs); Billy Godleman 56* (86); Bhuvneshwar Kumar 1/5 (6 overs)		143/5 (36.3 overs); Murali Vijay 41 (53); David Wainwright 1/21 (6 overs)

Indians won by 5 wickets
County Ground, Derby
Umpires: Steve Garratt (Eng) and George Sharp (Eng)

- Derbyshire won the toss and elected to bat.

=== One-day: Middlesex v Indians ===
22 August 2014
10:30
Scorecard

Indians; 230 (44.2 overs)	v	Middlesex; 135 (39.5 overs)
Ambati Rayudu 72 (82); Ollie Rayner 4/32 (9.2 overs)		James Harris 20 (22); Karn Sharma 3/14 (4.5 overs)

Indians won by 95 runs
Lord's, London
Umpires: Neil Bainton (Eng) and Richard Illingworth (Eng)

- Middlesex won the toss and elected to field.

== Test series ==
=== 1st Test ===
9–13 July 2014
Scorecard

India	v	England
457 (161 overs); Murali Vijay 146 (361); James Anderson 3/123 (38 overs)		496 (144.5 overs); Joe Root 154* (295); Bhuvneshwar Kumar 5/82 (30.5 overs)
391/9d (123 overs); Stuart Binny 78 (114); Moeen Ali 3/105 (28 overs)

Match drawn
Trent Bridge, Nottingham
Umpires: Kumar Dharmasena (SL) and Bruce Oxenford (Aus)
Player of the match: James Anderson (Eng)

- India won the toss and elected to bat.
- Stuart Binny (Ind) made his Test debut.

The 1st Test was a dull affair after the pitch proved to be difficult to bowl on. India won the toss and with the help of Murali Vijay's first century outside India and a 10th-wicket stand of 111 runs from Bhuvneshwar Kumar and Mohammed Shami, India scored 457. Alastair Cook's poor form with the bat continued and England were at 298/9 late on day 3, but a Test-record 198-run partnership between James Anderson and Joe Root for the final wicket helped them to a lead of 39 runs by the end of the innings. On the morning of the fifth day, some incisive bowling from England led to a possibility of a result. However, a half-century from Stuart Binny on his Test debut meant the match resulted in a draw, but not before Cook brought himself on to bowl, taking his maiden Test wicket in his second over.

At the end of the match, it was reported that India had complained against Anderson of physical abuse against Ravindra Jadeja at lunch on day 2, which led to level 3 charges being brought against Anderson and level 2 against Jadeja. The hearing was to be held on 22 July after the end of the 2nd Test. The charge against Jadeja was later reduced to level 1 and he was fined 50 percent of his match fee. The BCCI appealed against the fine and after a six-hour hearing over video conference, both players were found not guilty.

=== 2nd Test ===
17–21 July 2014
Scorecard

India	v	England
295 (91.4 overs); Ajinkya Rahane 103 (154); James Anderson 4/60 (23 overs)		319 (105.5 overs); Gary Ballance 110 (203); Bhuvneshwar Kumar 6/82 (31 overs)
342 (103.1 overs); Murali Vijay 95 (247); Ben Stokes 3/51 (18.1 overs)		223 (88.2 overs); Joe Root 66 (146); Ishant Sharma 7/74 (23 overs)

India won by 95 runs
Lord's, London
Umpires: Kumar Dharmasena (SL) and Bruce Oxenford (Aus)
Player of the match: Ishant Sharma (Ind)

- England won the toss and elected to field first.

England inserted India on a green wicket and soon had them reeling at 145/7 in the second session of the match. However, a century by Ajinkya Rahane and a good knock by Bhuvneshwar Kumar led India to 295. England rode on Gary Ballance's second Test century to take a narrow lead. Fifties from Murali Vijay, Ravindra Jadeja and Bhuvneshwar Kumar in India's second innings meant England required 319 to win the Test. England captain Cook's poor form continued and England ended day 4 needing 209 runs with six wickets in hand. With the last ball before lunch on the final day, Ishant Sharma got Moeen Ali out to a bouncer; India continued to pepper England with relentless short-pitched bowling, and within an hour of play restarting, England were all out. After the match, England wicket-keeper Matt Prior announced that he would step down for the rest of the summer due to injury. This was India's first overseas Test win for three years.

=== 3rd Test ===
27–31 July 2014
Scorecard

England	v	India
569/7d (163.4 overs); Ian Bell 167 (256); Bhuvneshwar Kumar 3/101 (37 overs)		330 (106.1 overs); Ajinkya Rahane 54 (113); James Anderson 5/53 (26.1 overs)
205/4d (40.4 overs); Alastair Cook 70* (114); Ravindra Jadeja 3/52 (10.4 overs)		178 (66.4 overs); Ajinkya Rahane 52* (121); Moeen Ali 6/67 (20.4 overs)

England won by 266 runs
The Rose Bowl, Southampton
Umpires: Marais Erasmus (SA) and Rod Tucker (Aus)
Player of the match: James Anderson (Eng)

- England won the toss and elected to bat.
- Jos Buttler (Eng) and Pankaj Singh (Ind) made their Test debuts.

This was the first Test match played in England to start on a Sunday. The third Test of the series was dominated by England right from the start. England posted a strong first-innings total, helped by centuries from Ian Bell and Ballance, combined with a quick debut half-century by Jos Buttler and a return to form for Cook, before they declared with 14 overs remaining on the second day. In India's first innings, all the batsmen got starts, but a failure to capitalise on them meant that England had a 229-run lead. Thanks to Cook and a quick-fire fifty from Joe Root, England were able to declare for the second time on the stroke of tea on the fourth day, setting India a target of 445 runs for victory. India lost four wickets in the evening session, before Moeen Ali rattled through the lower order before lunch on day 5, resulting in India's worst batting display on the tour up to that point. Ali finished with figures of 8/129 for the match, and England won their first Test in 10 attempts.

=== 4th Test ===
7–11 August 2014
Scorecard

India	v	England
152 (46.4 overs); MS Dhoni 71 (133); Stuart Broad 6/25 (13.4 overs)		367 (105.3 overs); Joe Root 77 (161); Bhuvneshwar Kumar 3/75 (24 overs)
161 (43 overs); Ravichandran Ashwin 46* (56); Moeen Ali 4/39 (13 overs)

England won by an innings and 54 runs
Old Trafford, Manchester
Umpires: Marais Erasmus (SA) and Rod Tucker (Aus)
Player of the match: Stuart Broad (Eng)

- India won the toss and elected to bat.
- The start of day 1 was delayed by 30 minutes due to a wet outfield.
- Rain on day 2 meant only 36 overs were possible.

Having won the toss and chosen to bat, India collapsed to 8/4 by the sixth over, and despite fighting knocks from captain MS Dhoni and Ravichandran Ashwin, they were bowled out for 152. England scored 367 in reply, a 215-run lead, including half-centuries from Bell, Buttler and Root. England bowler Stuart Broad suffered a broken nose from a delivery by Varun Aaron and was unable to take any further part in the match. In the second innings, England bowled India out for 161 to win the match by an innings and 54 runs and take a 2–1 lead in the series.

=== 5th Test ===
15–19 August 2014
Scorecard

India	v	England
148 (61.1 overs); MS Dhoni 82 (140); Chris Woakes 3/30 (14 overs)		486 (116.3 overs); Joe Root 149* (165); Ishant Sharma 4/96 (30 overs)
94 (29.2 overs); Stuart Binny 25* (28); Chris Jordan 4/18 (4.2 overs)

England won by an innings and 244 runs
The Oval, London
Umpires: Kumar Dharmasena (SL) and Paul Reiffel (Aus)
Player of the match: Joe Root (Eng)

- England won the toss and elected to field.
- The start of day 1 was delayed by 30 minutes due to a wet outfield.
- Rain on day 3 at 12:50 prompted an early lunch and the start of the afternoon session was delayed until 14:30.

England won the toss and elected to field first, and reduced India to 36/5 before lunch. The visitors were 90/9 by the end of the 45th over, but a 58-run partnership for the 10th wicket from Dhoni and Ishant Sharma brought India to 148 by the end of their innings. Dhoni made more than half of India's runs, scoring 82 before he was caught at long leg off Stuart Broad. England achieved 62 runs for no wicket in the 19 overs that remained of day 1, and went on to reach 385/7 by the end of day 2, Root finishing the day unbeaten on 92. Root went on to reach an unbeaten 149 runs, helping England to a total of 486. Rain meant the players took an early lunch on day 3, with India already 9/2. The final eight wickets fell in just 23 overs after play restarted, with Stuart Binny top-scoring on 25 not out. After the match, India were penalised for a slow over rate during the game, with captain Dhoni receiving a 60% fine of his match fee and the rest of the team 30%.

== ODI series ==
=== 1st ODI ===
25 August 2014
10:30
Scorecard

England	v	India

Match abandoned without a ball bowled
County Ground, Bristol
Umpires: Rob Bailey (Eng) and Paul Reiffel (Aus)

- No toss
- Match abandoned due to rain at 13:30.

=== 2nd ODI ===
27 August 2014
10:30
Scorecard

India; 304/6 (50 overs)	v	England; 161 (38.1 overs)
Suresh Raina 100 (75); Chris Woakes 4/52 (10 overs)		Alex Hales 40 (63); Ravindra Jadeja 4/28 (7 overs)

India won by 133 runs (D/L method)
Sophia Gardens, Cardiff
Umpires: Richard Illingworth (Eng) and Paul Reiffel (Aus)
Player of the match: Suresh Raina (Ind)

- England won the toss and elected to field.
- Rain before the start of the England innings reduced their target to 295 runs in 47 overs.
- Alex Hales (Eng) made his ODI debut.

=== 3rd ODI ===
30 August 2014
10:30
Scorecard

England; 227 (50 overs)	v	India; 228/4 (43 overs)
Alastair Cook 44 (65); Ravichandran Ashwin 3/39 (10 overs)		Ambati Rayudu 64* (78); Ben Stokes 1/31 (6 overs)

India won by 6 wickets
Trent Bridge, Nottingham
Umpires: Michael Gough (Eng) and Paul Reiffel (Aus)
Player of the match: Ravichandran Ashwin (Ind)

- India won the toss and elected to field.

=== 4th ODI ===
2 September 2014
10:30
Scorecard

England; 206 (49.3 overs)	v	India; 212/1 (30.3 overs)
Moeen Ali 67 (50); Mohammed Shami 3/28 (7.3 overs)		Ajinkya Rahane 106 (100); Harry Gurney 1/51 (6.3 overs)

India won by 9 wickets
Edgbaston, Birmingham
Umpires: Paul Reiffel (Aus) and Tim Robinson (Eng)
Player of the match: Ajinkya Rahane (Ind)

- India won the toss and elected to field.
- Dhawal Kulkarni (Ind) made his ODI debut.
- With this victory, his 91st as captain, MS Dhoni became India's most successful ODI captain.

=== 5th ODI ===
5 September 2014
10:30
Scorecard

England; 294/7 (50 overs)	v	India; 253 (48.4 overs)
Joe Root 113 (108); Mohammed Shami 2/52 (10 overs)		Ravindra Jadeja 87 (68); Ben Stokes 3/47 (7 overs)

England won by 41 runs
Headingley, Leeds
Umpires: Richard Kettleborough (Eng) and Paul Reiffel (Aus)
Player of the match: Joe Root (Eng)

- India won the toss and elected to field.

== Only T20I ==
7 September 2014
15:00
Scorecard

England; 180/7 (20 overs)	v	India; 177/5 (20 overs)
Eoin Morgan 71 (31); Mohammed Shami 3/38 (4 overs)		Virat Kohli 66 (41); Steven Finn 1/28 (4 overs)

England won by 3 runs
Edgbaston, Birmingham
Umpires: Ian Gould (Eng) and Tim Robinson (Eng)
Player of the match: Eoin Morgan (Eng)

- England won the toss and elected to bat.
- Jason Roy (Eng), Ambati Rayudu and Karn Sharma (Ind) all made their T20I debuts.

== Statistics ==
=== Test series ===
==== Batting ====
Most runs

Player	Matches	Runs	Average	Highest
(England) Joe Root	5	518	103.60	154*
(England) Gary Ballance	5	503	71.85	156
(India) Murali Vijay	5	402	40.20	146
(India) M S Dhoni	5	349	34.90	82
(India) Ajinkya Rahane	5	299	33.22	103

==== Bowling ====
Most Wickets

Player	Matches	Wickets	Runs	Ave	BBI
(England) James Anderson	5	25	515	20.60	5/53
(India) Bhuvneshwar Kumar	5	19	506	26.63	6/82
(England) Moeen Ali	5	19	437	23.00	6/67
(England) Stuart Broad	5	19	437	23.00	6/25

== Broadcasters ==
Country	TV broadcaster(s)
Australia	Fox Sports
India	STAR Sports 1 (English feed); STAR Sports 3 (Hindi feed); DD National (ODIs & T20 only)
South Africa	SuperSport
United Kingdom and Ireland	Sky Sports
United States	ONE World Sports

The 5th Test was the 200th live England Test match to be shown on Sky Sports.
