= Bentley & Skinner =

British jewellery and antiques company

Coordinates: 51°30′29.9″N 0°8′23.25″W

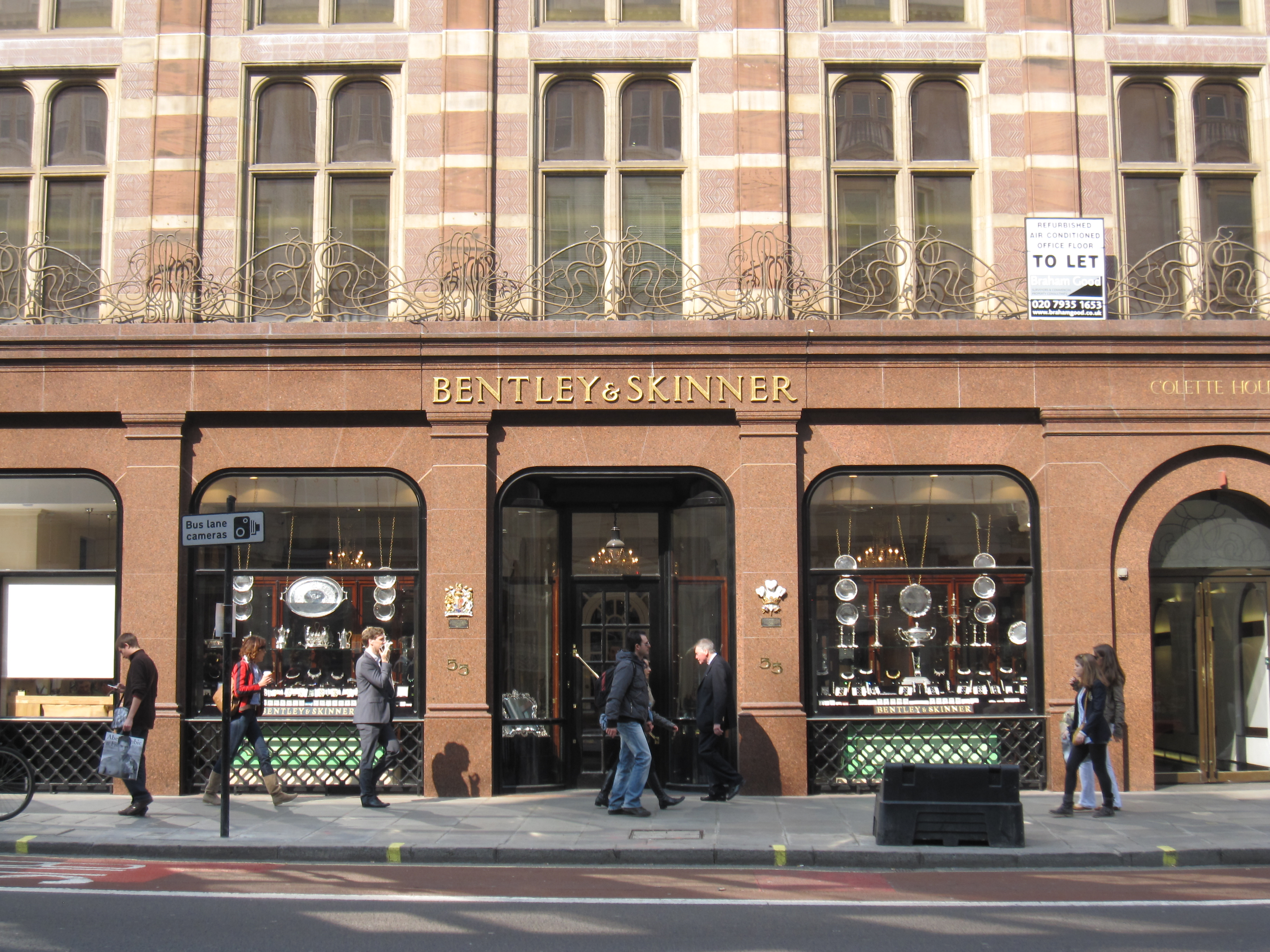
- Company type: Private
- Industry: Jewellery
- Founded: 1880; 146 years ago in London
- Headquarters: London, United Kingdom
- Owner: Mark Evans
- Website: www.bentley-skinner.co.uk

Bentley & Skinner is a British family held company specialising in fine antique jewelry, silver and objects of art by Carl Faberge. Bentley & Skinner are jewellers and silversmiths by appointment to the Queen and the Prince of Wales.

Skinner & Co was founded in 1880, and began supplying jewelry to the English Royal family during Queen Victoria's reign. Bentley & Co was founded in 1934. The amalgamation of the two companies in 1997 created Bentley & Skinner, located today at 55 Piccadily in Mayfair London.

In 2007 the jewellers created the diamond-encrusted skull sculpture For the Love of God for Damien Hirst.

== History ==
Skinner & Co. was established in 1880. In 1893 Spencer Compton Cavendish, 8th Duke of Devonshire commissioned the jeweller to create a diamond coronet for his wife Louisa Cavendish, Duchess of Devonshire. She was seen as a leader of fashion and society, holding many balls at Devonshire House and was especially well known for the magnificent jewellery that she wore. In order to make the coronet the 8th Duke of Devonshire removed the diamonds in the Devonshire Parure and other heirlooms, such as the 6th Duke's Garter Star. These totalled 1041 diamonds, to which Skinner added another 840.

Bentley & Co. was founded in 1934. The two companies joined in 1997 creating Bentley & Skinner, Jewellers by Royal Appointment.
