= English cricket team in India in 1992–93 =

International cricket tour

	England	India
- Dates: 3 January – 5 March 1993
Captains	Graham Gooch	Mohammad Azharuddin

Test series
- Result: India won the 3-match series 3–0
Most runs	Graeme Hick (315)	Vinod Kambli (317)
Most wickets	Graeme Hick (8)	Anil Kumble (21)
- Player of the series: Anil Kumble

One Day International series
- Results: 7-match series drawn 3–3
Most runs	Robin Smith (305)	Navjot Sidhu (287)
Most wickets	Paul Jarvis (15)	Javagal Srinath (13)
- Player of the series: Navjot Singh Sidhu

The English cricket team toured India during January, February and March 1993. The tour was beset by controversy over England's poor performances and results, with selection, tour management, the Indian cuisine and climate, airport industrial action and even players' facial hair being blamed for the lack of success.

As far as squad selection was concerned, the primary focus was the omission of David Gower, who had averaged over 50 in the previous summer's series against Pakistan. His replacement was Dermot Reeve who ended up not even featuring in the Test series. The official reason for leaving Gower out of the squad was that he was "too old", but with veterans Mike Gatting and John Emburey also making the trip, despite having only just returned from a ban for playing cricket in apartheid South Africa, this seemed rather spurious. Questions about it were even raised in Parliament and a special general meeting of the MCC convened, but to no effect, and Gower's presence in India was as a media representative only. Buried beneath this furore was the additional omission of Jack Russell, considered by most to be England's best wicketkeeper, in favour of the largely unheralded Richard Blakey.

Indian captain Mohammad Azharuddin was also under considerable pressure heading into the series, after a poor tour of South Africa that led to the Indian media questioning his captaincy, but the tone changed after his match-winning performance in the first Test.

India won the Test series 3–0, keeping the same eleven throughout, and the One Day International series was drawn three games apiece.

== Squads ==
England	India
Graham Gooch (c); Alec Stewart (wk); Richard Blakey (wk); Mike Atherton; Phillip DeFreitas; John Emburey; Neil Fairbrother; Mike Gatting; Graeme Hick; Paul Jarvis; Chris Lewis; Devon Malcolm; Dermot Reeve (played ODIs only); Ian Salisbury; Robin Smith; Phil Tufnell; Paul Taylor	Mohammad Azharuddin (c); Kiran More (wk); Pravin Amre; Rajesh Chauhan; Kapil Dev; Vinod Kambli; Anil Kumble; Manoj Prabhakar; Venkatapathy Raju; Navjot Sidhu; Sachin Tendulkar; Salil Ankola (played ODIs only); Maninder Singh (played ODIs only); Ajay Sharma (played ODIs only); Vijay Yadav (played ODIs only)

== Test series ==
=== 1st Test ===
29 January – 2 February
Scorecard

India	v	England
371 (122.5 overs); M Azharuddin 182 (197); GA Hick 3/19 [12.5]		163 (100.1 overs); MW Gatting 33 (143); RK Chauhan 3/30 [29.1]
82/2 (29.2 overs); NS Sidhu 37 (68); GA Hick 2/9 [6]		286 (f/o) (137.2 overs); MW Gatting 81 (165); A Kumble 3/76 [40]

India won by 8 wickets
Eden Gardens, Calcutta
Umpires: PD Reporter (Ind) and S Venkataraghavan (Ind)
Player of the match: M Azharuddin (Ind)

Speculation about the future of Azharuddin as captain was quelled as he guided India from a slightly wobbly 93/3 to a defendable 371. His innings of 182 was supported by Sachin Tendulkar, Pravin Amre and Kapil Dev, with whom he added 123, 62, and 68 respectively. None of the England bowlers looked threatening, and the decision to omit a second front-line spinner in order to play four seamers looked flawed, especially when Gooch finally turned to Graeme Hick and he ended up with three wickets, including Azharuddin's.

England's batting was insipid. The top order failed miserably, slumping to 40/4 and 89/6, but the tail worked hard and Ian Salisbury came close to saving the follow-on after a three-hour stay at the crease for 28. Second time around, they offered up more defiance, Alec Stewart and Mike Gatting showing some form, but insufficient to set India a challenging total. Again, Salisbury (26) batted well, and was supported for more than an hour and a half by Paul Taylor, but ultimately to no avail.

India had a couple of scares on their way to the 79 that they needed to win, with Hick picking up two more wickets (Sidhu and Prabhakar), but never looked in any serious danger of collapsing.

Vinod Kambli and Rajesh Chauhan made their debuts for India in this match. This was Graham Gooch's 100th Test match.

=== 2nd Test ===
11–15 February
Scorecard

India	v	England
560/6d (165 overs); SR Tendulkar 165 (296); PW Jarvis 2/72 [28]		286 (127.3 overs); NH Fairbrother 83 (159); SLV Raju 4/103 [54]
		252 (f/o) (81.1 overs); CC Lewis 117 (140); A Kumble 6/64 [21]

India won by an innings and 22 runs
M. A. Chidambaram Stadium, Madras
Umpires: VK Ramaswamy (Ind) and RS Rathore (Ind)
Player of the match: SR Tendulkar (Ind)

England's plans for the second Test were put awry by captain Gooch succumbing to a dodgy prawn curry the night before the match. Robin Smith was promoted to open the batting with Alec Stewart, who was relieved of wicketkeeping duties by Richard Blakey. Phil Tufnell came into the side, despite a lack of form.

India won the toss as proceeded to capitalise on the visitors' shortcomings, racking up 275/2 on the first day, including a century from Navjot Sidhu. Sachin Tendulkar also went on to make a big century (165) on the second day and played some sublime strokes, including three boundaries in five balls from Malcolm to bring up his hundred, with further support from Amre (78) and Kapil Dev (66*), as India declared on 560/6, then their highest score against England.

Unfortunately for Mike Gatting, the innings was also notable for his dropping of what has been regarded as one of the easiest missed catches at all time. Fielding at silly point off Ian Salisbury, Gatting was left groping at thin air after batsman Kiran More popped up a simple chance to him.

In reply, England lost Smith early, but Stewart (74) and Hick (64) batted solidly, adding 113 for the second wicket. Again though, England collapsed, from 157/2 to 220/7, and only Fairbrother's 83 made the total a respectable 286, but even that wasn't sufficient to avoid the follow-on. The spinners starred for India, bowling all but 7 overs in the innings, and taking all 9 wickets that fell to bowlers, with Raju (4–103) the pick. The story was similar in the second innings – Smith's 56 held together an otherwise flaky top order, which slumped to 99/6 before Chris Lewis took the attack back to the bowlers, finally delivering on the promise that many had seen for years. Lewis and Salisbury added 73, and Lewis and Tufnell another 56, but neither of these partnership were sufficient to prevent England losing by an innings. Lewis's innings of 117, which included two sixes and 15 fours, was his maiden Test century. Kumble picked up six wickets as he winkled most of the England batsmen out, while Kapil Dev set the tone by ripping out Stewart and Hick for ducks at the top of the order.

=== 3rd Test ===
19–23 February
Scorecard

England	v	India
347 (135 overs); GA Hick 178 (319); N Kapil Dev 3/35 [15]		591 (189.3 overs); VG Kambli 224 (411); PCR Tufnell 4/142 [39.3]
229 (82.5 overs); RA Smith 62 (166); A Kumble 4/70 [26]

India won by an innings and 15 runs
Wankhede Stadium, Bombay
Umpires: PD Reporter (Ind) and S Venkataraghavan (Ind)
Player of the match: VG Kambli

England's decision to go into the final Test of the series with just four specialist bowlers (Phillip DeFreitas, Lewis, Tufnell and John Emburey) looked justified when Gooch won the toss and elected to bat. Jarvis, Malcolm and Salisbury were dropped, and Fairbrother was unwell and unable to play, so in came Atherton, Emburey, DeFreitas and the fit-again Gooch. Blakey retained his place behind the stumps so that Stewart could once again open the batting. India kept faith with the same team that had won the first two tests convincingly.

England were soon in trouble though, at 58/4, and then 118/6 as wickets once again fell in clusters. Once Hick and Lewis (49) (demoted to number eight) were together though, batting looked an awful lot easier, as they put on 93 for the next wicket, and only started to get bogged down once the ball began turning more sharply. Hick manipulated the tail masterfully though, and eked out a further 51 with Emburey and 68 with Tufnell (2*), before being the last man out, taken by a marvelous running catch by Kapil Dev for a Test career-best 178.

In reply, India made a positive start. Prabhakar and Sidhu added 109 for the first wicket, and when that fell it only brought Vinod Kambli to the crease. He and Tendulkar (78), two local boys, delighted the fans in adding 196 for the third wicket, batting together for almost the whole day on a slow wicket and seemingly carving boundaries from the bowling at will. Kambli also received great support from another Bombay-based player, Amre (57), with whom he added 101, but eventually fell to Lewis for a magnificent 224, as India racked up a massive 591.

Set 244 to avoid an innings defeat, England started badly again. Prabhakar took the wickets of the top three batsmen, reducing the visitors to 34/3, and they never really recovered despite half-centuries from Smith and Gatting, and 47 from Hick. The tail was unable to demonstrate the same resilience as in the first innings, only DeFreitas making double figures, and the Test series ended on a whimper for England when DeFreitas was stumped off Raju still sixteen runs short of making India bat a second time.

This marked just the second time that India had won three Tests in a series (the previous occasion being in New Zealand in 1967–68).

== ODI series ==
=== 1st ODI ===
16 January 1993
Scorecard

England	v	India

Match cancelled without a ball bowled
Sardar Patel Stadium, Ahmedabad

- No toss.
- Match cancelled following disturbances in Ahmedabad and when the security of the players could not be guaranteed.

=== 2nd ODI ===
18 January 1993
Scorecard

India; 223/3 (48 overs)	v	England; 224/6 (48 overs)
Vinod Kambli 100* (149); Paul Jarvis 2/49 (10 overs)		Alec Stewart 91 (126); Kapil Dev 2/36 (10 overs)

England won by 4 wickets
Sawai Mansingh Stadium, Jaipur
Umpires: Shyam Bansal (Ind) and Srinivas Venkataraghavan (Ind)
Player of the match: Vinod Kambli (Ind)

- England won the toss and elected to field.
- Match reduced to 48 overs per side.

England needed 19 to win of the last two overs and got there off the final ball, two missed run-out attempts in the final over costing India dear. Kambli scored a hundred on his 21st birthday.

=== 3rd ODI ===
21 January 1993
Scorecard

England; 198/6 (50 overs)	v	India; 201/5 (45.1 overs)
Graeme Hick 56 (73); Javagal Srinath 2/34 (10 overs)		Navjot Singh Sidhu 76 (107); Phil DeFreitas 2/31 (10 overs)

India won by 5 wickets
Sector 16 Stadium, Chandigarh
Umpires: RV Ramani (Ind) and V. K. Ramaswamy (Ind)
Player of the match: Javagal Srinath (Ind)

- India won the toss and elected to field.
- Ian Salisbury (Eng) made his debut in ODIs.

=== 4th ODI ===
26 February 1993
Scorecard

England; 218/9 (47 overs)	v	India; 170 (41.4 overs)
Graeme Hick 56 (81); Javagal Srinath 5/41 (9 overs)		Navjot Singh Sidhu 40 (57); Paul Jarvis 5/35 (8.4 overs)

England won by 48 runs
M. Chinnaswamy Stadium, Bangalore
Umpires: V. K. Ramaswamy (Ind) and M. R. Singh (Ind)
Player of the match: Paul Jarvis (Eng)

- India won the toss and elected to field.

=== 5th ODI ===
1 March 1993
Scorecard

India; 137/7 (26 overs)	v	England; 141/4 (25.4 overs)
Sachin Tendulkar 24 (32); Paul Jarvis 2/40 (5 overs)		Neil Fairbrother 53* (52); Kapil Dev 1/10 (4 overs)

England won by 6 wickets
Keenan Stadium, Jamshedpur
Umpires: AL Narasimhan (Ind) and Chandra Sathe (Ind)
Player of the match: Neil Fairbrother (Eng)

- England won the toss and chose to field.
- Match was reduced to 26 overs per side.

=== 6th ODI ===
4 March 1993
Scorecard

England; 256 (50 overs)	v	India; 257/7 (48 overs)
Robin Smith 129 (145); Manoj Prabhakar 4/54 (10 overs)		Navjot Singh Sidhu 134* (160); Devon Malcolm 3/40 (10 overs)

India won by 3 wickets
Captain Roop Singh Stadium, Gwalior
Umpires: Arani Jayaprakash (Ind) and Piloo Reporter (Ind)
Player of the match: Navjot Singh Sidhu (Ind)

- India won the toss and elected to field.
- Neil Fairbrother (Eng) and Navjot Singh Sidhu (Ind) passed 1,000 and 2,000 runs respectively in ODIs.

=== 7th ODI ===
5 March 1993
Scorecard

England; 265/4 (48 overs)	v	India; 267/6 (46.4 overs)
Graeme Hick 105* (109); Javagal Srinath 3/37 (9 overs)		Mohammed Azharuddin 95* (63); Paul Jarvis 3/39 (10 overs)

India won by 4 wickets
Captain Roop Singh Stadium, Gwalior
Umpires: Shyam Bansal (Ind) and Srinivas Venkataraghavan (Ind)
Player of the match: Mohammed Azharuddin (Ind)

- India won the toss and elected to field.
- Graeme Hick's 105* was his first ODI century in his 27th match.
