= West Indian cricket team in India in 2013–14 =

International cricket tour

West Indies cricket team in India in 2013–14
	West Indies	India
- Dates: 31 October 2013 – 27 November 2013
Captains	Darren Sammy (Tests), Dwayne Bravo (ODIs)	MS Dhoni

Test series
- Result: India won the 2-match series 2–0
Most runs	Shivnarine Chanderpaul (133)	Rohit Sharma (288)
Most wickets	Shane Shillingford (11)	Ravichandran Ashwin (12)
- Player of the series: Rohit Sharma (Ind)

One Day International series
- Results: India won the 3-match series 2–1
Most runs	Darren Bravo (160)	Virat Kohli (204)
Most wickets	Ravi Rampaul (7)	Ravichandran Ashwin (6)
- Player of the series: Virat Kohli (Ind)

The West Indies cricket team toured India, playing two Test matches and a three-match One Day International series against the Indian national team from 31 October to 27 November 2013. The series, not initially in the ICC Future Tours Programme, was hastily arranged by the Board of Control for Cricket in India (BCCI) following the postponement of India's scheduled tour to South Africa to December, with that series itself reduced to 2 Tests and 3 ODIs due to a spat between the BCCI and Cricket South Africa.

The series was notable for Indian cricketer Sachin Tendulkar's retirement from all forms of the game at the conclusion of the second Test, which was his 200th overall.

== Squads ==
Tests		ODIs	
West Indies	India	West Indies	India
Darren Sammy (c); Tino Best; Darren Bravo; Shivnarine Chanderpaul; Sheldon Cottrell; Narsingh Deonarine; Kirk Edwards; Shannon Gabriel; Chris Gayle; Veerasammy Permaul; Kieran Powell; Denesh Ramdin (wk); Marlon Samuels; Shane Shillingford; Chadwick Walton (wk)	MS Dhoni (c, wk); Ravichandran Ashwin; Shikhar Dhawan; Virat Kohli; Bhuvneshwar Kumar; Amit Mishra; Mohammed Shami; Pragyan Ojha; Cheteshwar Pujara; Ajinkya Rahane; Ishant Sharma; Rohit Sharma; Sachin Tendulkar; Murali Vijay; Umesh Yadav	Dwayne Bravo (c); Tino Best; Darren Bravo; Johnson Charles (wk); Narsingh Deonarine; Chris Gayle; Jason Holder; Sunil Narine; Veerasammy Permaul; Kieran Powell; Denesh Ramdin (wk); Ravi Rampaul; Darren Sammy; Marlon Samuels; Lendl Simmons	MS Dhoni (c, wk); Ravichandran Ashwin; Shikhar Dhawan; Ravindra Jadeja; Virat Kohli; Bhuvneshwar Kumar; Amit Mishra; Mohammed Shami; Suresh Raina; Ambati Rayudu; Mohit Sharma; Rohit Sharma; Jaydev Unadkat; Vinay Kumar; Yuvraj Singh

== Tour match ==
31 October – 2 November
Scorecard

West Indians	v	Uttar Pradesh
466 (103.3 Overs); Shivnarine Chanderpaul 112 (153 Balls); Imtiaz Ahmed 5/117 (25 Overs)		372/9d (96.3 Overs); Parvinder Singh 112 (142 Balls); Sheldon Cotterrell 3/65 (19.3 Overs)
199/5 (37 Overs); Marlon Samuels 58 (47 Balls); Piyush Chawla 4/72 (14 Overs)

Match drawn
Jadavpur University Complex, Kolkata
Umpires: Ulhas Gandhe and C. Shamsuddin

- West Indians won the toss and elected to bat

== Test series ==
=== First Test ===
6–10 November
Scorecard

West Indies	v	India
234 (78 overs); Marlon Samuels 65 (98); Mohammed Shami 4/71 (17 overs)		453 (129.4 overs); Rohit Sharma 177 (301); Shane Shillingford 6/167 (55 overs)
168 (54.1 overs); Darren Bravo 37 (78); Mohammed Shami 5/47 (13.1 overs)

India won by an innings and 51 runs
Eden Gardens, Kolkata
Umpires: Nigel Llong (Eng) and Richard Kettleborough (Eng)
Player of the match: Rohit Sharma (Ind)

- West Indies won the toss and elected to bat
- Mohammed Shami and Rohit Sharma (Ind) and Sheldon Cottrell (WI) made their Test debuts.

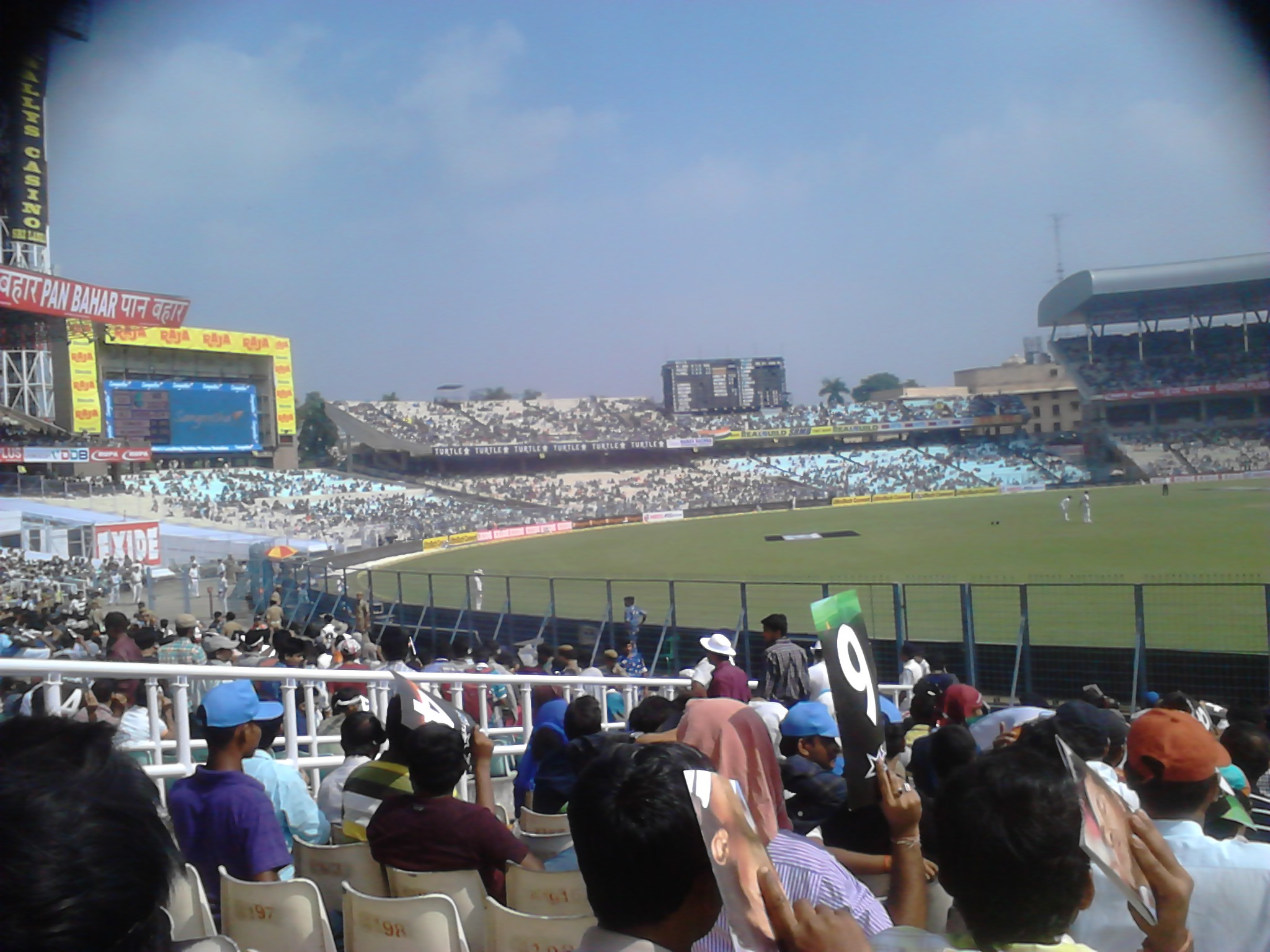
A view of Eden Gardens during the first Test

Debuting in the international Test series, Mohammed Shami took 4 wickets giving 71 runs off 17 overs he bowled in the first innings. In second innings he took 5 wickets giving 47 runs of 13.1 overs. This performance was compared with the best score by a medium-paced Indian bowler Syed Abid Ali who took 6 wickets giving 55 runs off 17 overs against Australia in 1967. Rohit Sharma also debuted in Test match with this match and scored the highest runs of 177 and marked his first century in the format.

Being the 199th Test match of Tendulkar and his last at Eden Gardens, the Cricket Association of Bengal (CAB) celebrated the event in a grand scale. A music album launched dedicated to his achievements was played at various intersections in the city of Kolkata when he arrived. The stadium displayed a life-size wax statue of Tendulkar and a cake of 199 Shôndeshs and 199 tricolour balloons were released. On 8 November, around 2000 students in Alathur, Palakkad district, Kerala donned Tendulkar masks to pay tribute to him.

=== Second Test ===
14–18 November
Scorecard

West Indies	v	India
182 (55.2 overs); Kieran Powell 48 (80); Pragyan Ojha 5/40 (11.2 overs)		495 (108 overs); Cheteshwar Pujara 113 (167); Shane Shillingford 5/179 (43 overs)
187 (47 overs); Dinesh Ramdin 53*(68); Pragyan Ojha 5/49 (18 overs)

India won by an innings and 126 runs
Wankhede Stadium, Mumbai
Umpires: Nigel Llong (Eng) and Richard Kettleborough (Eng)
Player of the match: Pragyan Ojha (Ind)

- India won the toss and elected to field
- Sachin Tendulkar (Ind) played in his 200th and final Test.
- Pragyan Ojha (Ind) took his first ten wicket haul in Tests and last test .

==== Tendulkar's retirement ====
In October 2013, Indian cricketer Sachin Tendulkar declared he would retire from Tests and all other forms of cricket after playing the second Test against the West Indies. He had retired from ODIs in December 2012, and from the Twenty20 format in October 2013, after he played the 2013 Champions League Twenty20, where his team Mumbai Indians took the winner's trophy. The match would be Tendulkar's 200th Test match. On his request, the Board of Control for Cricket in India (BCCI) agreed to schedule the match at Wankhede Stadium, his home ground in Mumbai.

Mumbai Cricket Association (MCA), the governing body for cricket in Mumbai and its surrounding regions, planned various events in honour of Tendulkar's retirement. Sharad Pawar, the president of the MCA, called it the "end of a golden era". On 11 November, MCA named the Association's ground at Mahavir Nagar, Kandivali in North Mumbai as "Sachin Tendulkar Gymkhana Club". The stadium had cutouts displaying various events from Tendulkar's career, and each ticket had his photograph and listed his 51 Test centuries. The online ticket booking for the match started from 11 November on Kyazoonga.com, and crashed multiple times due to high traffic. The online travel agency Musafir.com arranged 200 taxis to connect from various locations in Mumbai to the stadium for free for the match. On 12 November, India Today organized a day-long Salaam Sachin Conclave where various cricketers, celebrities of Bollywood, politicians and others spoke about him.

==== Day 1 ====
The match started with a toss of special gold coin flipped by the Indian captain M. S. Dhoni, winning the toss and choosing to bowl. The special golden coin had Tendulkar's image inscribed on one side and MCA's logo on other. The token coin was then presented to Tendulkar as a memento. 1000 more replicas were presented to dignitaries. The Union Minister of India, Kapil Sibal then unveiled Tendulkar's postal stamp. Tendulkar became the second Indian after Mother Teresa to have such stamp released in their lifetime.

West Indies were bowled out for 182 from 55.2 overs. Kieran Powell scored the highest with 48 runs. Indian left-arm orthodox spinner Pragyan Ojha took the maximum of 5 wickets. At the end of the inning, captain and wicketkeeper Dhoni completed 251 dismissals by a wicketkeeper and became 7th to do so in the history. Indian right-arm off-break bowler Ravichandran Ashwin took his 100th Test wicket with captain Darren Sammy and became the 5th fastest in the history to do so in 18 Test matches. India's batting started with Murali Vijay scoring the highest of 43 runs for the day. At the loss of two wickets and Tendulkar (38) and Cheteshwar Pujara (34) batting, the day ended with 157 total runs by Indian team.

==== Day 2 ====
Continuing ahead, Tendulkar and Pujara reached 74 and 113 respectively. Tendulkar recorded his 68th Test 50, but was dismissed for 74, missing his 101st International century. Rohit Sharma finished on 111 not out, his second consecutive century. By the end of day two, India led by 313 runs with a total score of 495. Shane Shillingford recorded fifth consecutive five-for in five innings, nearing the record of six consecutive five-fors set by Charlie Turner in 1888. The day ended with West Indies on 43 with loss of 3 wickets.

==== Day 3 ====
West Indies started on their chase from previous day's score of 43 but wound up all out at 187. India won the game by an innings and 126 runs and thus the over all Test series as 2–0. Ojha again took the highest of 5 wickets in this inning. Tendulkar in his emotional speech thanked various personalities of his life along with the audience. In return, the crowd screamed "Thank you". The hashtags like #ThankYouSachin, #SachinSachin and #SRT200 trended on social media sites like Twitter and Facebook.

== ODI series ==
=== 1st ODI ===
21 November
Scorecard

West Indies; 211 (48.5 overs)	v	India; 212/4 (35.2 overs)
Darren Bravo 59 (77); Suresh Raina 3/34 (10 overs)		Virat Kohli 86 (84); Jason Holder 2/48 (8 overs)

India won by 6 wickets
Jawaharlal Nehru International Stadium, Kochi
Umpires: Vineet Kulkarni (Ind) and Rod Tucker (Aus)
Player of the match: Virat Kohli (India)

- West Indies won the toss and elected to bat
- Virat Kohli (Ind) became the joint-fastest cricketer to reach 5,000 runs in ODIs, thus equalling the record of Vivian Richards.

=== 2nd ODI ===
24 November
Scorecard

India; 288/7 (50 overs)	v	West Indies; 289/8 (49.3 overs)
Virat Kohli 99 (100); Ravi Rampaul 4/60 (10 overs)		Darren Sammy 63* (45); Ravichandran Ashwin 2/37 (10 overs)

West Indies won by 2 wickets
ACA-VDCA Cricket Stadium, Visakhapatnam
Umpires: Vineet Kulkarni (Ind) and Rod Tucker (Aus)
Player of the match: Darren Sammy (WI)

- West Indies won the toss and elected to field.

=== 3rd ODI ===
27 November
Scorecard

West Indies; 263/5 (50 overs)	v	India; 266/5 (46.1 overs)
Marlon Samuels 71 (93); Ravichandran Ashwin 2/45 (10 overs)		Shikhar Dhawan 119 (95); Ravi Rampaul 2/55 (10 overs)

India won by 5 wickets
Green Park Stadium, Kanpur
Umpires: Anil Chaudhary (Ind) and Rod Tucker (Aus)
Player of the match: Shikhar Dhawan (India)

- India won the toss and elected to field.
