= Australian cricket team in India in 2013–14 =

International cricket tour

	Australia	India
- Dates: 10 October 2013 – 2 November 2013
Captains	George Bailey	MS Dhoni

One Day International series
- Results: India won the 7-match series 3–2
Most runs	George Bailey (478)	Rohit Sharma (491)
Most wickets	Mitchell Johnson (7); James Faulkner (7)	Ravichandran Ashwin (9)
- Player of the series: (India) Rohit Sharma

Twenty20 International series
- Results: India won the 1-match series 1–0
Most runs	Aaron Finch (89)	Yuvraj Singh (77)
Most wickets	Clint McKay (2)	Vinay Kumar (3); Bhuvneshwar Kumar (3)
- Player of the series: (India) Yuvraj Singh

The Australia national cricket team toured India from 10 October to 2 November 2013, playing a seven-match One Day International series and one Twenty20 International against India. Due to an ongoing back injury, Australian captain Michael Clarke was replaced by Callum Ferguson and George Bailey captained the side. During the second ODI match, each of the top five Australian batsmen made a score of fifty or more, a feat which no side had previously achieved. Later in the match, India chased down the target of 360 runs, making this the second highest successful ODI run-chase. Two weeks later in the sixth match, India again chased down the Australian total of 350 runs to record the third highest run-chase to win a game. Coincidentally, all three highest run chases had come against Australia. In the seventh and final match, Indian batsman Rohit Sharma became the third man to make a double-century in ODI cricket, when he scored 209 from 158 balls. His innings included 16 sixes, the most in an ODI innings beating the previous record of 15 held by Australian cricketer Shane Watson. The record was later broken by England's Eoin Morgan who hit 17 sixes against Afghanistan in 2019.

== Squads ==
ODIs		T20Is	
India	Australia	India	Australia
MS Dhoni (c) (wk); Virat Kohli; Shikhar Dhawan; Rohit Sharma; Yuvraj Singh; Suresh Raina; Ambati Rayudu; Ravichandran Ashwin; Ravindra Jadeja; Amit Mishra; Bhuvneshwar Kumar; Mohammed Shami; Vinay Kumar; Ishant Sharma; Jaydev Unadkat	George Bailey (c); Michael Clarke (vc); Aaron Finch; Shane Watson; Adam Voges; Brad Haddin (wk); Xavier Doherty; Mitchell Johnson; James Faulkner; Nic Maddinson; Glenn Maxwell; Nathan Coulter-Nile; Moises Henriques; Clint McKay; Callum Ferguson	MS Dhoni (c) (wk); Rohit Sharma; Shikhar Dhawan; Virat Kohli; Yuvraj Singh; Suresh Raina; Ambati Rayudu; Umesh Yadav; Ravichandran Ashwin; Ravindra Jadeja; Mohammed Shami; Amit Mishra; Vinay Kumar; Bhuvneshwar Kumar	George Bailey (c); Aaron Finch; Nic Maddinson; David Warner; Glenn Maxwell; Brad Haddin (wk); Shane Watson; Moises Henriques; James Faulkner; Xavier Doherty; Adam Voges; Mitchell Johnson; Clint McKay; Nathan Coulter-Nile

== Only T20I ==
10 October
19:30 (D/N)
Scorecard

Australia; 201/7 (20 overs)	v	India; 202/4 (19.4 overs)
Aaron Finch 89 (52); Vinay Kumar 3/26 (4 overs)		Yuvraj Singh 77* (35); Clint McKay 2/50 (4 overs)

India won by 6 wickets
Saurashtra Cricket Association Stadium, Rajkot
Umpires: Anil Chaudhary (Ind) and Chettithody Shamshuddin (Ind)
Player of the match: Yuvraj Singh (Ind)

- India won the toss and elected to field first.
- Nic Maddinson (Aus) made his T20I debut.
- Vinay Kumar and Ishant Sharma played their last T20I.

== ODI series ==
=== 1st ODI ===
13 October
13:30 (D/N)
Scorecard

Australia; 304/8 (50 overs)	v	India; 232 (49.4 overs)
George Bailey 85 (82); Yuvraj Singh 2/34 (6 overs)		Virat Kohli 61 (85); James Faulkner 3/47 (8 overs)

Australia won by 72 runs
Maharashtra Cricket Association Stadium, Pune
Umpires: Richard Kettleborough (Eng) and Vineet Kulkarni (Ind)
Player of the match: George Bailey (Aus)

- Australia won the toss and elected to bat
- This was first ODI Match at this venue

=== 2nd ODI ===
16 October
13:30 (D/N)
Scorecard

Australia; 359/5 (50 overs)	v	India; 362/1 (43.3 overs)
George Bailey 92* (50); Vinay Kumar 2/73 (9 overs)		Rohit Sharma 141* (123); James Faulkner 1/60 (7 overs)

India won by 9 wickets
Sawai Mansingh Stadium, Jaipur
Umpires: Richard Kettleborough (Eng) and Vineet Kulkarni (Ind)
Player of the match: Rohit Sharma (Ind)

- Australia won the toss and elected to bat
- Virat Kohli's century is the fastest by an Indian Cricketer in ODI: 100 off 52 balls.
- This is now the fourth highest run chase in the history of ODI cricket.
- All of the first five Australian batsmen made a score of fifty or more, a feat which no side had previously achieved.

A historic match in ODI history unfolded as Australia elected to bat on a high scoring pitch. Aaron Finch completed his half-century and was well on his way when he was run out by Suresh Raina. After getting to his fifty, Shane Watson was soon dismissed by Vinay Kumar on 59. Phillip Hughes fell 17 runs short of his 3rd hundred and was dismissed by Ravichandran Ashwin. Australian captain George Bailey and Glenn Maxwell both scored fifty and Australia ended their innings on 359/5 with George Bailey standing not out on 92. This was the first instance of all of the top five batsmen scoring at least 50 runs in an ODI, the second instance happened 7 years later in 2020.

India then started nicely and compiled 100 runs in just 16.2 overs with the loss of no wicket. Both openers Shikhar Dhawan and Rohit Sharma completed their fifties and added 176 runs for the first wicket before Dhawan got caught behind off James Faulkner. Virat Kohli then came to the crease and was dropped on the first ball. Kohli then got a good start and completed his half century in 27 Balls. Rohit got to his 3rd hundred in 100 balls, and Kohli got the fastest hundred by any Indian batsman, the century coming in just 52 balls and India went on to win the match by 9 wickets with 39 balls to spare.

=== 3rd ODI ===
19 October
13:30 (D/N)
Scorecard

India; 303/9 (50 overs)	v	Australia; 304/6 (49.3 overs)
MS Dhoni 139* (121); Mitchell Johnson 4/46 (10 overs)		Adam Voges 76* (88); Vinay Kumar 2/50 (8.3 overs)

Australia won by 4 wickets
I. S. Bindra Stadium, Mohali
Umpires: Richard Kettleborough (Eng) and Chettithody Shamshuddin (Ind)
Player of the match: James Faulkner (Aus)

- Australia won the toss and elected to field

=== 4th ODI ===
23 October
13:30 (D/N)
Scorecard

Australia; 295/8 (50 overs)	v	India; 27/0 (4.1 overs)
George Bailey 98 (94); Mohammed Shami 3/42 (8 overs)		Shikhar Dhawan 14* (12)

No result
JSCA International Cricket Stadium, Ranchi
Umpires: Richard Kettleborough (Eng) and Vineet Kulkarni (Ind)

- India won the toss and elected to field
- No further play was possible due to rain.

=== 5th ODI ===
26 October
13:30 (D/N)
Scorecard

Australia	v	India

Match abandoned without a ball bowled
Barabati Stadium, Cuttack
Umpires: Nigel Llong (Eng) and Sundaram Ravi (Ind)

- A wet outfield prevented any play

=== 6th ODI ===
30 October
13:30 (D/N)
Scorecard

Australia; 350/6 (50 overs)	v	India; 351/4 (49.3 overs)
George Bailey 156 (114); Ravichandran Ashwin 2/64 (10 overs)		Virat Kohli 115* (66); Mitchell Johnson 2/72 (10 overs)

India won by 6 wickets
Vidarbha Cricket Association Stadium, Nagpur
Umpires: Nigel Llong (Eng) and Sundaram Ravi (Ind)
Player of the match: Virat Kohli (Ind)

- India won the toss and elected to field
- This is now the fourth highest run chase in the history of ODI cricket.

=== 7th ODI ===
2 November
13:30 (D/N)
Scorecard

India; 383/6 (50 overs)	v	Australia; 326 (45.1 overs)
Rohit Sharma 209 (158); Xavier Doherty 2/74 (10 overs)		James Faulkner 116 (73); Mohammed Shami 3/52 (8.1 overs)

India won by 57 runs
M. Chinnaswamy Stadium, Bengaluru
Umpires: Nigel Llong (Eng) and Sundaram Ravi (Ind)
Player of the match: Rohit Sharma (Ind)

- Australia won the toss and elected to field
- This was Australia's highest score ever in unsuccessful run chases.
- James Faulkner (Aus) scored his first century in ODIs.This was the fastest hundred for Australia.
- Rohit Sharma's 209 is the sixth highest ODI score.
- Rohit Sharma hit 16 sixes in this match, a new world record (Previous record - Shane Watson - 15 sixes).
- Glenn Maxwell's fifty equalled the second fastest fifty in ODI cricket (18 balls).
- Vinay Kumar became the first Indian to concede 100 runs in a ODI.
- India won the 7-match series 3-2 (2 games were washed out).
- This was only fourth time when Australian bowlers conceded 350+ runs in ODI, first time was against South Africa (438) and three time against India in the same series.
- Vinay Kumar (Ind) and Adam Voges (Aus) played their last ODI.

== Statistics ==
Rohit Sharma was awarded the man of the series after scoring 491 runs. At the end of the series there were several changes in ICC Batsman rankings. Virat Kohli was ranked as the number 1 batsmen while George Bailey reached his career best of 3rd Spot.

=== Batting ===
Most runs

Player	Matches	Runs	Avg	HS
(India) Rohit Sharma	6	491	122.75	209
(Australia) George Bailey	6	478	95.60	156
(India) Virat Kohli	6	344	114.66	115*
(India) Shikhar Dhawan	6	284	56.80	100
(Australia) Glenn Maxwell	6	248	41.33	92

=== Bowling ===
Most wickets

Player	Matches	Wickets	Econ	BBI
(India) Ravichandran Ashwin	6	9	5.98	2/51
(India) Ravindra Jadeja	6	8	5.58	3/73
(India) Vinay Kumar	5	8	7.93	2/50
(India) Mohammed Shami	3	7	6.62	3/42
(Australia) Mitchell Johnson	5	7	5.68	4/46
