= Ambati Rayudu =

Indian cricketer (born 1985)

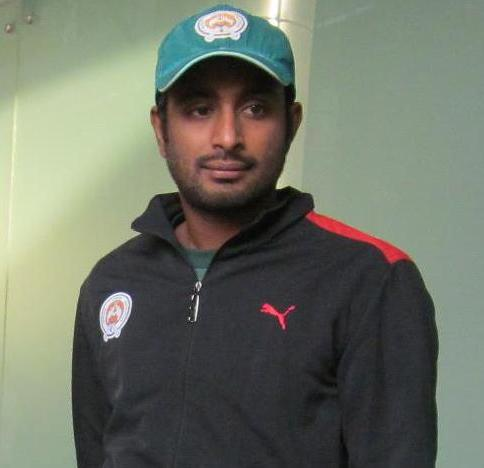

Personal information
- Full name: Ambati Thirupathi Rayudu
- Born: 23 September 1985 (age 41); Guntur, Andhra Pradesh, India
- Height: 5 ft 7 in (1.70 m)
- Batting: Right-handed
- Bowling: Right-arm off-spin
- Role: Wicket-keeper batsman
- Relatives: Rohit Rayudu (cousin)

International information
- National side: India (2013–2019)
- ODI debut (cap 196): 24 July 2013 v Zimbabwe
- Last ODI: 8 March 2019 v Australia
- ODI shirt no.: 5
- T20I debut (cap 48): 7 September 2014 v England
- Last T20I: 5 October 2015 v South Africa
- T20I shirt no.: 5

Domestic team information
- Years: Team
- 2001/02–2004/05: Hyderabad
- 2005/06: Andhra
- 2006/07–2009/10: Hyderabad
- 2010–2017: Mumbai Indians
- 2010/11–2015/16: Baroda
- 2016/17: Vidarbha
- 2017/18–2019/20: Hyderabad
- 2018–2023: Chennai Super Kings
- 2020/21–2021/22: Andhra
- 2022/23: Baroda
- 2023: St. Kitts & Nevis Patriots
- 2024: MI Emirates

Career statistics
Competition	ODI	T20I	FC	LA
Matches	55	6	97	172
Runs scored	1,694	42	6,151	5,479
Batting average	47.06	10.50	45.56	40.28
100s/50s	3/10	0/0	16/34	5/40
Top score	124*	20	210	124*
Balls bowled	121	–	798	421
Wickets	3	–	10	13
Bowling average	41.33	–	51.80	31.23
5 wickets in innings	0	–	0	0
10 wickets in match	0	–	0	0
Best bowling	1/5	–	4/43	4/45
Catches/stumpings	14/–	4/–	74/–	68/–
Medal record
Men's cricket
Representing India
ACC Asia Cup
Winner	2018 United Arab Emirates
ACC U19 Asia Cup
Winner	2003 Pakistan
- Source: ESPNcricinfo, 5 November 2022

Ambati Thirupathi Rayudu (born 23 September 1985) is a former Indian international cricketer, commentator and politician. He played 61 limited overs matches for the India national cricket team between 2013 and 2019. He won the IPL trophy a record six times, being the only player other than Rohit Sharma to achieve this feat. He played for Hyderabad in domestic cricket, Mumbai Indians and Chennai Super Kings in the Indian Premier League (IPL). He was a part of the Indian squad which won the 2018 Asia Cup. He is a right-handed middle-order batsman, who occasionally keeps wicket and bowls right-arm off breaks.

Rayudu began his first-class career with Hyderabad in 2002 at the age of 16 and, by the following year, was playing for India A. He captained the India Under-19 team at the 2004 ICC Under-19 Cricket World Cup and was expected to break into the senior team. Disputes with players and state association, followed by signing up with the "rebel" Indian Cricket League, led to him being ignored for national team selection. He returned to domestic cricket in 2009 by accepting BCCI's amnesty offer and terminating his ICL contract. After strong performances for Baroda in domestic cricket and Mumbai Indians in the IPL, he was named in the Indian squad for the first time in 2012. He eventually made his international debut in July 2013, in an ODI against Zimbabwe.

After being dropped from Indian squad for the 2019 ICC World Cup, Rayudu got an offer from Iceland cricket board to join Iceland team which he declined. On 2 July 2019, he announced his retirement from all forms of international cricket.

On 28 May 2023, he announced his retirement from the IPL. On 29 May 2023, Rayudu announced his retirement from all forms of Indian cricket. Shortly after, in June 2023, Rayudu was added to the roster for the Texas Super Kings in the inaugural season of Major League Cricket. It was his first appearance in a franchise league outside of India.

In 2023, he announced his foray into politics in Andhra Pradesh. On 28 December 2023, he joined YSR Congress Party, but left on 6 January 2024, in a record 9 days. On 10 January 2024, he joined the Jana Sena Party, stating that the party's ideologies match his more than YSRCP's.

== Early life ==
Rayudu was born on 23 September 1985 in upper-middle-class family. in Guntur, Andhra Pradesh, India. His father Sambasiva Rao worked at the archives department. Rayudu has said in an interview that his father was his inspiration to take up cricket and put him into a coaching camp when he was in third grade. Rayudu's father took him to the cricket academy of former Hyderabad cricketer Vijay Paul in 1992. Paul recalls, "Rayudu's father used to ferry him around on his scooter to the cricket camps and various matches." According to Abdul Azeem, “Rao used to stand about 50 meters away and watch Rayudu practice day-in and day-out."

== Career ==
=== Early promise ===
Rayudu began his career playing for Hyderabad youth teams in the late-90s, playing at the Under-16 and Under-19 levels. He appeared for India Under-15s at the ACC Under-15 Trophy in 2000, finishing as the leading run-scorer of the tournament and winning man of the match in the final against Pakistan. Prolific run-scoring at age group levels saw him getting elevated to the senior team squad of Hyderabad. He made his first-class debut for Hyderabad in January 2002, at the age of 16, during the 2001–02 Ranji Trophy. Batting at 4, he scored 33 in that match, his only first-class appearance of the season. Later that year, he was made captain of India Under-17s and also made appearances for India Under-19s. On India Under-19 tour of England, his maiden Under-19 assignment, Rayudu batted as an opener and made a total of 291 runs from 3 innings and finished as the highest run-getter of the series which India swept 3–0. His best efforts of the series came in the third ODI in which he scored a 169-ball 177 to single-handedly take his team to the target of 304 from a precarious position of 137 for 6.

Rayudu appeared in all matches for Hyderabad in the 2002–03 Ranji Trophy and amassed a total of 698 runs at an average of 69.80 to finish third on the leading run-scorers list. During the tournament, playing only his third Ranji game, Rayudu scored 210 and 159 not out against Andhra in the same match and "pressed his claims for an India cap". He became the youngest player in the history of Ranji Trophy to score a double century and a century in the same match.

In 2003, Rayudu played extensively for India A on its West Indies and England tours. He averaged 87 on the England tour following which experts opined that he is "sure to play for India in the near future". ESPNcricinfo wrote about the 17-year-old: "Touted as the next big hope for Indian middle-order batting, Rayudu has had the critics gushing about his scintillating strokeplay and his composure under pressure." However he had a disappointing stint with India Seniors at the Challenger Trophy in September 2003, where his perceived weakness against the short ball was exploited. He then failed to make an impression in the Emerging Players Tournament after which he played four matches in the following Ranji season with an average of over 54. He captained India Under-19s to the title at the Asia Under-19 tournament, with an unbeaten fifty in the final.

Rayudu captained the Indian team at the 2004 ICC Under-19 Cricket World Cup in Bangladesh where India finished as semifinalists. He averaged 24.83 with the bat at the tournament and was banned for the semifinal against Pakistan for breaching the ICC Code of Conduct in the previous match. He struck an unbeaten century for India A against Kenya at Nairobi later that year. He averaged just 11.93 from 7 matches in the 2004–05 Ranji Trophy, but struck 3 fifties in 4 matches in the Ranji One-Day Trophy.

=== Decline, ICL and return ===
Due to differences with the then Hyderabad coach Rajesh Yadav, Rayudu switched to Andhra for the 2005–06 season. He averaged 35 in the Ranji Trophy that season and made headlines when he was attacked by Hyderabad player Arjun Yadav with stumps after Yadav was dismissed during the Andhra-Hyderabad match. Rayudu returned to Hyderabad the following season after Vivek Jaisimha took over as the team's coach. Rayudu could play only three Ranji matches that season as he suffered a knee injury that kept him out of action. In one of the three matches he scored 62 and 110 not out, against Rajasthan. Upon returning from injury, he averaged 21 in the 2006–07 Ranji One-Day Trophy.

Midway through 2007, the "rebel" Indian Cricket League (ICL) was formed. The Board of Control for Cricket in India (BCCI), which opposed the league, declared that players and officials affiliating with the ICL will be banned from Indian domestic cricket. In August 2007, it was reported that Rayudu and six other players from Hyderabad had already signed up for the ICL. In an interview in November 2007, Rayudu backed his decision to play in the ICL by remarking, "I didn't want to play ten years of domestic cricket and feel that I have not played any international-quality opposition." He added that it was a chance "to play against quality opposition for three years and it will also be telecast on TV. People will hopefully see me perform. And I want to perform for my own personal satisfaction." He played for Hyderabad Heroes and ICL India in the ICL from 2007 to 2008.

In 2009, the BCCI granted amnesty to 79 Indian players in the ICL, including Rayudu, allowing them to come back to Indian domestic cricket. Rayudu returned to play for Hyderabad and said he wanted to "concentrate on domestic cricket and push for the IPL." Rayudu averaged 43 from 7 matches in the 2009–10 Ranji Trophy, and 50 from 5 matches in the 2009–10 Vijay Hazare Trophy. In early 2010, he was signed up by the Mumbai Indians ahead of the 2010 Indian Premier League.

Before the 2010–11 season, Rayudu decided to play for Baroda after Hyderabad got relegated to the Plate Division of Ranji Trophy, with Hyderabad coach Venkatapathy Raju saying "it was done in bad taste". At the Ranji Trophy that season, Rayudu finished as Baroda's leading run-getter with 566 runs in 9 matches at an average of 56.60 including an unbeaten double hundred and three half-centuries, while the team finished runners-up. At the 2011–12 Ranji Trophy, he averaged 48.75 with two centuries. He was then recalled to the India A squad on its New Zealand tour and scored 105 and 26 not out against New Zealand A at Lincoln. He was also included in the 30 probables for the 2012 ICC World Twenty20 but failed to make it to the final 15-man squad.

=== Indian team ===
In December 2012, the newly formed selection panel, chaired by Sandeep Patil who was also previously associated with the ICL, picked Rayudu as the replacement player for the injured Manoj Tiwary for the T20I series against England. However, Rayudu did not feature in the playing eleven in either of the two matches. In the 2012–13 Ranji Trophy season, Rayudu scored 666 runs at an average of 60.54 with a hundred and seven fifties. He played for Rest of India in the 2013 Irani Cup against Mumbai and scored 51 and 156*. He was the top-scorer in the 2012–13 Deodhar Trophy final where his innings of 78* helped West Zone chase down the target of 290 against North Zone.

During the West Indies tri-series in July 2013, Rayudu was named the replacement for Mahendra Singh Dhoni who was ruled out of the series due to an injury, but did not appear in any of the matches. Rayudu was then selected in a second string Indian squad for the tour of Zimbabwe later that month. He made his international debut in the first ODI of the series, on 24 July 2013, and was crucial in setting up an Indian win. He made 63* and in partnership with his captain, Virat Kohli, who made a century, helped India win. He became the 12th Indian batsman to score a half-century on ODI debut.

Rayudu continued to be a part of India's ODI squads as a reserve batsman in the home series against Australia in October 2013, against West Indies in November 2013, as well as on tours to South Africa in December 2013 and New Zealand in January 2014, making only two appearances in the playing eleven across the four series. He played in all matches of 2014 Asia Cup and scored 58 against Pakistan. He struggled during the three-match ODI tour of Bangladesh, making two single-digit scores.

Rayudu was picked in the ODI and T20I squads for the tour of England in July 2014. He played in the third ODI at Nottingham where he picked his maiden ODI wicket, that of England captain Alastair Cook, and top-scored with 64 not out to help India register a six-wicket win. He followed it with a 53 in the fifth ODI at Leeds. He averaged 28.50 in the home ODI series against West Indies in October 2014. Rayudu scored his maiden ODI century in the following series against Sri Lanka, hitting an unbeaten 121 in the second ODI at Ahmedabad and guiding India to the target of 275. During the match, he shared 100-plus partnerships with both Shikhar Dhawan and Kohli and won his first man of the match award for the knock. In the fifth ODI at Ranchi, he made 59 to set up another successful run-chase and a 5–0 whitewash of Sri Lanka.

Rayudu averaged 19.33 in the tri-series against Australia and England and was selected in India's 15-member squad for the 2015 Cricket World Cup which reached the semifinal, but did not appear in any of the matches in the tournament. He played two ODIs on the Bangladesh tour in June 2015 and averaged 22. In the subsequent tour of Zimbabwe, Rayudu scored an unbeaten 124 in the first ODI at Harare and won the man of the match award. He scored 41 in the next match before suffering an injury that ruled him out of the tour. India went on to sweep the series 3–0 and Rayudu was adjudged man of the series.

In the 2022 IPL Rayudu was bought by the Chennai Super Kings for ₹6.75 crores again after a four-year stint with them. On 28 May 2023, prior to the 2023 IPL final, Rayudu announced that it would be his final IPL match. However, on 29 May 2023, Rayudu announced his retirement from all forms of Indian cricket.

=== Other Leagues ===
In 2023, shortly after announcing his retirement from Indian cricket, he joined former teammates, Devon Conway and Mitchell Santner, and coach, Stephen Fleming for Rayudu's debut in a league outside of India. He is listed as the wicket keeper batsman on the Texas Super Kings squad in one of the 9 available overseas player slots for the inaugural season of Major League Cricket.

In August 2023, he was signed by St. Kitts & Nevis Patriots as a marquee player ahead of the 2023 season of the Caribbean Premier League. He became the second Indian to feature in the CPL, after Pravin Tambe.

== Personal life ==
Rayudu married Chennupalli Vidya, a college friend, on 14 February 2009. They have two children.

=== Controversies ===
Rayudu has been involved in confrontations with players and umpires throughout his career. In 2005, while playing for Andhra in the Ranji Trophy, he was involved in a scuffle with Hyderabad player Arjun Yadav, in which he was attacked by Yadav with a stump. During the 2012 IPL, Rayudu was fined 100% of his match fee for using obscene and abusive language against opposition player Harshal Patel after a match. In 2014, he was seen hurling expletives at the umpire after his dismissal during a match of India A's tour of Australia. During a 2016 IPL match, he was involved in an on-field spat with Mumbai Indians teammate Harbhajan Singh. In 2018, the BCCI banned Rayudu for two matches after his heated confrontation with the umpires during a Syed Mushtaq Ali Trophy match against Karnataka.

In September 2017, a video surfaced on social media showing Rayudu getting into a heated argument, manhandling and punching a senior citizen.

In April 2019, Rayudu tweeted "Just Ordered a new set of 3d glasses to watch the world cup" after the selectors dropped him from the World Cup squad in favour of Vijay Shankar, whom the chairman of selection committee had called a "three dimensional cricketer".
