= Sri Lankan cricket team in India in 2014–15 =

International cricket tour

	India	Sri Lanka
- Dates: 30 October 2014 – 16 November 2014
Captains	Virat Kohli	Angelo Mathews

One Day International series
- Results: India won the 5-match series 5–0
Most runs	Virat Kohli (329)	Angelo Mathews (339)
Most wickets	Axar Patel (11)	Angelo Mathews (4)
- Player of the series: Virat Kohli (India)

The Sri Lanka cricket team toured India from 30 October to 16 November 2014 for five One Day Internationals (ODIs) after the abandonment of the West Indies tour of India due to a pay dispute. India won the series 5–0, their fourth 5-0 whitewash in ODI history. It is also Sri Lanka's first 0-5 whitewash loss.

In the fourth ODI match, Indian batsman Rohit Sharma scored 264, the highest ever score in an ODI. He hit 33 fours in that innings which is also a world record.

== Squads ==
ODIs
India	Sri Lanka
Virat Kohli (c); Varun Aaron; Ravichandran Ashwin; Stuart Binny; Shikhar Dhawan; Ravindra Jadeja; Kedar Jadhav; Dhawal Kulkarni; Vinay Kumar; Amit Mishra; Axar Patel; Ajinkya Rahane; Suresh Raina; Ambati Rayudu; Wriddhiman Saha (wk); Karn Sharma; Rohit Sharma; Ishant Sharma; Robin Uthappa (wk); Umesh Yadav	Angelo Mathews (c); Dinesh Chandimal; Chathuranga de Silva; Niroshan Dickwella (wk); Tillakaratne Dilshan; Shaminda Eranga; Lahiru Gamage; Mahela Jayawardene; Nuwan Kulasekara; Ajantha Mendis; Kusal Perera; Thisara Perera; Dhammika Prasad; Seekkuge Prasanna; Ashan Priyanjan; Suraj Randiv; Kumar Sangakkara (wk); Upul Tharanga; Lahiru Thirimanne

== Tour matches ==
=== List A: India A vs Sri Lanka ===
30 October 2014
09:00
Scorecard

India A 382/6 (50 overs)	v	Sri Lanka; 294/9 (50 overs)
Rohit Sharma 142 (111); Dhammika Prasad 4/57 (6 overs)		Upul Tharanga 76 (75); Karn Sharma 4/47 (10 overs)

India A won by 88 runs
Brabourne Stadium, Mumbai
Umpires: Rajesh Deshpande and Pashchim Pathak (Ind)

- Sri Lanka won the toss and chose to field.
- India A 12 (11 batting, 11 fielding); Sri Lanka 15 (11 batting, 11 fielding).

== ODI series ==
=== 1st ODI ===
2 November 2014
01:30 PM
Scorecard

India; 363/5 (50 overs)	v	Sri Lanka; 194 (39.2 overs)
Shikhar Dhawan 113 (107); Suraj Randiv 3/78 (10 overs)		Mahela Jayawardene 43 (36); Ishant Sharma 4/34 (8 overs)

India won by 169 runs
Barabati Stadium, Cuttack, Odisha
Umpires: Vineet Kulkarni (Ind) and Bruce Oxenford (Aus)
Player of the match: Ajinkya Rahane (Ind)

- Sri Lanka won the toss and chose to field.
- Lahiru Gamage (SL) made his ODI debut.
- Suresh Raina (Ind) played in his 200th ODI and went past 5,000 ODI runs.

The 1st ODI proved to be a rather one-sided affair. After a sedate start Indian openers opened up after the end of the 1st powerplay and after taking an early 2nd powerplay India scored 105 runs between overs 21–30. Both the openers got here 50's and 100's in the same overs and building on this foundations and a quickfire 50 by Raina India set a daunting target on 364 for Sri Lanka. Sri Lanka's openers also started cautiously but unlike Indian openers they couldn't build on and with loss of wickets at constant intervals India won by 169 runs. Ishant Sharma recorded his best ODI bowling performance. Varun Aaron had to leave the field during his fourth over due to muscle injury.

=== 2nd ODI ===
6 November 2014
02:30 PM
Scorecard

Sri Lanka; 274/8 (50 overs)	v	India; 275/4 (44.3 overs)
Angelo Mathews 92* (101); Axar Patel 2/39 (10 overs)		Ambati Rayudu 121* (118); Seekkuge Prasanna 3/53 (7.3 overs)

India won by 6 wickets
Sardar Patel Stadium, Ahmedabad, Gujarat
Umpires: Vineet Kulkarni (Ind) and Bruce Oxenford (Aus)
Player of the match: Ambati Rayudu (Ind)

- Sri Lanka won the toss and elected to bat.
- Ambati Rayudu (Ind) scored his first century in ODIs.

The 2nd ODI was another one-sided affair. Sri Lanka lost Kusal Perera in the 1st over and despite some aggressive batting from Dilshan and Sangakkara India were still able to keep the innings under control. However, some late order hitting from Thisara Perera and an unbeaten 92 from captain Angelo Mathews took Sri Lanka to 274, which was the same score they scored in the 2011 Cricket World Cup Final. India lost Ajinkya Rahane early but two 100+ partnerships for the 2nd and 3rd wickets took India to victory. Ambati Rayudu scored his maiden international century.

=== 3rd ODI ===
9 November 2014
02:30 PM (D/N)
Scorecard

Sri Lanka; 242 (48.2 overs)	v	India; 245/4 (44.1 overs)
Mahela Jayawardene 118 (124); Umesh Yadav 4/53 (9 overs)		Shikhar Dhawan 91 (79); Tillakaratne Dilshan 1/10 (4 overs)

India won by 6 wickets
Rajiv Gandhi International Cricket Stadium, Hyderabad, Telangana
Umpires: Vineet Kulkarni (Ind) and Bruce Oxenford (Aus)
Player of the match: Mahela Jayawardena (SL)

- Sri Lanka won the toss and elected to bat.
- Mahela Jayawardene became the fifth batsmen to score 12,000 ODI runs.
- Virat Kohli went past 6,000 runs in his career, the fastest in the world to do so. Shikhar Dhawan scored his 2,000th ODI run becoming the fastest Indian batsmen to reach this landmark.

Sri Lanka started the innings poorly, losing Kusal Perera to Umesh Yadav again in the 1st over. A 105 run partnership between Mahela Jayawardene and Tillakaratne Dilshan revived Sri Lanka's innings. however, three-wickets in three overs by Axar Patel during the powerplay resulted in Sri Lanka losing all the momentum. Banking on a superb century from Jayawardene and a 50 from Dilshan Sri Lanka scored 242. India started positively in their reply and a fighting 79-ball 91 from Shikhar Dhawan laid the foundation for India's victory. During his innings of 53 Indian captain Virat Kohli became the fastest batsmen in terms of innings to reach 6000 career ODI runs. Yadav achieved his maiden 4-wicket haul in ODIs.

=== 4th ODI ===
13 November 2014
02:30 PM
Scorecard

India; 404/5 (50 overs)	v	Sri Lanka; 251 (43.1 overs)
Rohit Sharma 264 (173); Angelo Mathews 2/44 (8 overs)		Angelo Mathews 75 (68); Dhawal Kulkarni 4/34 (10 overs)

India won by 153 runs
Eden Gardens, Kolkata, West Bengal
Attendance: 50,389
Umpires: Bruce Oxenford (Aus) and Sundaram Ravi (Ind)
Player of the match: Rohit Sharma (Ind)

- India won the toss and elected to bat.
- Karn Sharma (Ind) made his ODI debut.
- Rohit Sharma became the first batsman to score two double-centuries in ODIs.
- Rohit Sharma's 264 is the highest individual score in One Day International history and the second highest individual score in List A cricket.

The fourth match of the series became a one-man show. Rohit Sharma, playing his first international match after fracturing his finger against England in August 2014, scored a record-breaking 264 off 173 balls, as India scored 404 in their allocated 50 overs. The innings involved a 202 run partnership for the 3rd wicket between Sharma and captain Virat Kohli, and a 128 run partnership for the 5th wicket between Sharma and Robin Uthappa, in which Uthappa contributed only 16. Sri Lanka lost their first 4 wickets for 48 runs. Fifties from captain Angelo Mathews and Lahiru Thirimanne only delayed the inevitable as India took a 4–0 lead in the series.

=== 5th ODI ===
16 November 2014
02:30 PM (D/N)
Scorecard

Sri Lanka; 286/8 (50 overs)	v	India; 288/7 (48.4 overs)
Angelo Mathews 139* (116); Dhawal Kulkarni 3/57 (8 overs)		Virat Kohli 139* (126); Ajantha Mendis 4/73 (9.4 overs)

India won by 3 wickets
JSCA International Cricket Stadium, Ranchi, Jharkhand
Umpires: Bruce Oxenford (Aus) and Sundaram Ravi (Ind)
Player of the match: Angelo Mathews (SL)

- Sri Lanka won the toss and chose to bat.
- Kedar Jadhav (Ind) and Niroshan Dickwella (SL) made their ODI debuts.
- Angelo Mathews (SL) scored his first century in ODIs.

The start of the Sri Lankan innings followed the similar pattern from previous matches. They lost an opener early in their innings. However a 128 run partnership between captain Angelo Mathews and Lahiru Thirimanne lead to a recovery in the innings. Sri Lanka scored 73 runs in their last 5 overs and 114 runs in the last 10 as on the back of Mathews maiden ODI century Sri Lanka posted a competitive total.
