= West Indian cricket team in India in 2014–15 =

International cricket tour

West Indies in India in 2014-15
	India	West Indies
- Dates: 3 October – 17 October 2014
Captains	MS Dhoni	Denesh Ramdin (Test); Dwayne Bravo (ODI); Darren Sammy (T20I)

Test series

One Day International series
- Results: India won the 4-match series 2–1
Most runs	Virat Kohli (191)	Marlon Samuels (254)
Most wickets	Mohammed Shami (10)	Jerome Taylor (5)
- Player of the series: Mohammed Shami

Twenty20 International series

The West Indies cricket team toured India in October 2014. The tour was originally scheduled to consist of three Test matches, five One Day International matches and one Twenty20 International match. The ODI series was reduced from five matches to four, after the third match was cancelled due to Cyclone Hudhud.

On the day the series was to commence, the West Indies players threatened not to come to the ground unless they were paid their due amount by the WICB. After BCCI intervention, the WICB promised to pay their players and the series started. On 17 October 2014, at the time of the toss, West Indies ODI captain Dwayne Bravo brought the entire team with him and announced that they were abandoning the rest of the tour because they had not received their promised payment from the WICB. Later the BCCI confirmed that the remaining fixtures of the tour after the 4th ODI game had been cancelled, due to an ongoing pay dispute between the West Indies players, the West Indies Cricket Board and the players association. A senior BCCI official confirmed the development, saying the West Indies team management had informed the board of their decision earlier in the day. Sri Lanka have agreed in principle to play five ODIs in November in India following the West Indies abandoning the matches. Subsequently, the BCCI announced that it would suspend all further planned tours of the West Indies until further notice, and would undertake legal action against the WICB for the premature ending of the India tour.

In June 2016, India confirmed they would honour their tour to the West Indies, scheduled to take place the following month.

== Squads ==
Tests		ODIs		T20Is	
India	West Indies	India	West Indies	India	West Indies
		Mahendra Singh Dhoni (c, wk); Shikhar Dhawan; Ravindra Jadeja; Virat Kohli; Bhuvneshwar Kumar; Sanju Samson; Ajinkya Rahane; Suresh Raina; Ambati Rayudu; Mohammed Shami; Ishant Sharma; Murali Vijay; Umesh Yadav; Kuldeep Yadav; Akshar Patel; ~~Mohit Sharma~~	Dwayne Bravo (c); Sulieman Benn; Darren Bravo; Jason Holder; Leon Johnson; Kieron Pollard; Chris Gayle; Denesh Ramdin (wk); Ravi Rampaul; Kemar Roach; Andre Russell; Darren Sammy; Marlon Samuels; Dwayne Smith; Jerome Taylor; ~~Sunil Narine~~; ~~Lendl Simmons~~	Mahendra Singh Dhoni (c, wk); Stuart Binny; Shikhar Dhawan; Ravindra Jadeja; Virat Kohli; Bhuvneshwar Kumar; Manish Pandey; Akshar Patel; Ajinkya Rahane; Suresh Raina; Sanju Samson; Mohammed Shami; Karn Sharma; Kuldeep Yadav	

== Tour matches ==
=== List A: India A vs West Indians ===
3 October 2014
09:00
Scorecard

West Indians; 148 (38.1 overs)	v	India A 149/1 (25.3 overs)
Marlon Samuels 51 (59); Amit Mishra 3/26 (10 overs)		Unmukt Chand 79* (81); Kemar Roach 1/28 (4 overs)

India A won by 9 wickets
Brabourne Stadium, Mumbai
Umpires: Rajesh Deshpande and Pashchim Pathak

- West Indies won the toss and chose to bat

=== List A: India A vs West Indians ===
5 October 2014
02:30 (D/N)
Scorecard

India A 282 (48.1 overs)	v	West Indians; 266/9 (50 overs)
Unmukt Chand 101 (111); Jerome Taylor 3/51 (9.1 overs)		Denesh Ramdin 102 (102); Dhawal Kulkarni 3/39 (10 overs)

India A won by 16 runs
Wankhede Stadium, Mumbai
Umpires: Rajesh Deshpande and Anil Dandekar

- India A won the toss and chose to bat

=== First class: Indian Board President's XI vs West Indians ===
25–27 October 2014
Scorecard

Board President's XI	v	West Indians

Match cancelled
Green Park Stadium, Kanpur

== ODI Series ==
=== 1st ODI ===
8 October 2014
14:30 (D/N)
Scorecard

West Indies; 321/6 (50 Overs)	v	India; 197/10 (41 Overs)
Marlon Samuels 126* (116); Mohammed Shami 4/66 (9 overs)		Shikhar Dhawan 68 (92); Marlon Samuels 2/10 (3 overs)

West Indies won by 124 runs
Jawaharlal Nehru Stadium, Kochi
Umpires: Ian Gould (Eng) and Sundaram Ravi (Ind)
Player of the match: Marlon Samuels (WI)

- India won the toss and elected to field.

=== 2nd ODI ===
11 October 2014
14:30 (D/N)
Scorecard

India; 263/7 (50 overs)	v	West Indies; 215 (46.3 overs)
Suresh Raina 62 (60); Jerome Taylor 3/54 (10 overs)		Dwayne Smith 97 (97); Mohammed Shami 4/36 (9.3 overs)

India won by 48 runs
Feroz Shah Kotla Ground, New Delhi
Umpires: Ian Gould (Eng) and Sundaram Ravi (Ind)
Player of the match: Mohammed Shami (Ind)

- India won the toss and elected to bat.

=== 3rd ODI ===
14 October 2014
14:30 (D/N)
Scorecard

India	v	West Indies

Match abandoned
Dr. Y.S. Rajasekhara Reddy ACA-VDCA Cricket Stadium, Visakhapatnam

- Match abandoned without a ball bowled
- Due to Cyclone Hudhud, this match was cancelled on 12 October and reduced the series to four ODIs.

=== 4th ODI ===
17 October 2014
14:30 (D/N)
Scorecard

India; 330/6 (50 overs)	v	West Indies; 271 (48.1 overs)
Virat Kohli 127 (114); Sulieman Benn 1/30 (8 overs)		Marlon Samuels 112 (106); Akshar Patel 2/26 (10 overs)

India won by 59 runs
Himachal Pradesh Cricket Association Stadium, Dharamshala
Umpires: Ian Gould (Eng) and Vineet Kulkarni (Ind)
Player of the match: Virat Kohli (Ind)

- West Indies won the toss and elected to field.

=== 5th ODI ===
20 October 2014
14:30 (D/N)
Scorecard

India	v	West Indies

Match cancelled
Eden Gardens, Kolkata

== T20I series ==
=== Only T20I ===
22 October 2014
19:00 (D/N)
Scorecard

India	v	West Indies

Match cancelled
Barabati Stadium, Cuttack

== Test series ==
=== 1st Test ===
30 October 2014
Scorecard

India	v	West Indies

Match cancelled
Rajiv Gandhi International Cricket Stadium, Hyderabad

=== 2nd Test ===
7 November 2014
Scorecard

India	v	West Indies

Match cancelled
M. Chinnaswamy Stadium, Bangalore

=== 3rd Test ===
15 November 2014
Scorecard

India	v	West Indies

Match cancelled
Sardar Patel Stadium, Ahmedabad
