= Indian cricket team in Zimbabwe in 2013 =

Cricket Match

	Zimbabwe	India
- Dates: 24 July 2013 – 3 August 2013
Captains	Brendan Taylor	Virat Kohli

One Day International series
- Results: India won the 5-match series 5–0
Most runs	Elton Chigumbura (159)	Shikhar Dhawan (209)
Most wickets	Kyle Jarvis (4)	Amit Mishra (18)

The India national cricket team toured Zimbabwe from 24 July 2013 to 3 August 2013. The tour consisted of five One Day Internationals. India won the series 5–0. It was their first 5-0 ODI series sweep in an away series.

== Venues ==
The first three one-dayers were played in Harare Sports Club, Harare, and the last two in Queens Sports Club, Bulawayo.

== Squads ==
India	Zimbabwe
Virat Kohli (c); Shikhar Dhawan; Ambati Rayudu; Ravindra Jadeja; Dinesh Karthik (wk); Vinay Kumar; Amit Mishra; Cheteshwar Pujara; Ajinkya Rahane; Suresh Raina; Parvez Rasool; Mohammed Shami; Mohit Sharma; Rohit Sharma; Jaydev Unadkat	Brendan Taylor (c)(wk); Tendai Chatara; Elton Chigumbura; Michael Chinouya; Graeme Cremer; Kyle Jarvis; Hamilton Masakadza; Timycen Maruma; Natsai Mushangwe; Tinotenda Mutombodzi; Sikandar Raza; Vusimuzi Sibanda; Prosper Utseya; Brian Vitori; Malcolm Waller; Sean Williams

== ODI series ==
=== 1st ODI ===
24 July
09:30
Scorecard

Zimbabwe; 228/7 (50 overs)	v	India; 230/4 (44.5 overs)
Sikandar Raza 82 (112); Amit Mishra 3/43 (10 overs)		Virat Kohli 115 (108); Prosper Utseya 2/34 (10 overs)

India won by 6 wickets
Harare Sports Club, Harare
Umpires: Bruce Oxenford (Aus) and Russell Tiffin (Zim)
Player of the match: Virat Kohli (Ind)

- India won the toss and elected to field.
- Ambati Rayudu and Jaydev Unadkat made their ODI debuts for India.

=== 2nd ODI ===
26 July
09:30
Scorecard

India; 294/8 (50 overs)	v	Zimbabwe; 236/9 (50 overs)
Shikhar Dhawan 116 (127); Brian Vitori 2/27 (8 overs)		Vusi Sibanda 55 (65); Jaydev Unadkat 4/41 (10 overs)

India won by 58 runs
Harare Sports Club, Harare
Umpires: Owen Chirombe (Zim) and Bruce Oxenford (Aus)
Player of the match: Shikhar Dhawan (Ind)

- Zimbabwe won the toss and elected to field.

=== 3rd ODI ===
28 July
09:30
Scorecard

Zimbabwe; 183 (46 overs)	v	India; 187/3 (35.3 overs)
Sean Williams 45 (53); Amit Mishra 4/47 (10 overs)		Virat Kohli 68* (88); Tendai Chatara 1/34 (7.3 overs)

India won by 7 wickets
Harare Sports Club, Harare
Umpires: Bruce Oxenford (Aus) and Russell Tiffin (Zim)
Player of the match: Amit Mishra (Ind)

- India won the toss and elected to field.
- Michael Chinouya made his ODI debut for Zimbabwe.

=== 4th ODI ===
1 August
09:30
Scorecard

Zimbabwe; 144 (42.4 overs)	v	India; 145/1 (30.5 overs)
Elton Chigumbura 50* (66); Amit Mishra 3/25 (8.4 overs)		Suresh Raina 65* (71); Tendai Chatara 1/31 (5 overs)

India won by 9 wickets
Queens Sports Club, Bulawayo
Umpires: Jeremiah Matibiri (Zim) and Bruce Oxenford (Aus)
Player of the match: Mohit Sharma (Ind)

- India won the toss and elected to field.
- Cheteshwar Pujara and Mohit Sharma made their ODI debuts for India.

=== 5th ODI ===
3 August
09:30
Scorecard

Zimbabwe; 163 (39.5 overs)	v	India; 167/3 (34 overs)
Sean Williams 51 (65); Amit Mishra 6/48 (8.5 overs)		Ajinkya Rahane 50 (66); Kyle Jarvis 2/18 (8 overs)

India won by 7 wickets
Queens Sports Club, Bulawayo
Umpires: Owen Chirombe (Zim) and Bruce Oxenford (Aus)
Player of the match: Amit Mishra (Ind)

- India won the toss and elected to field.

== Statistics ==
=== Batting ===
Most runs

Player	Matches	Runs	Avg	HS
(India) Shikhar Dhawan	4	209	52.25	116
(India) Virat Kohli	5	197	98.50	115
(Zimbabwe) Elton Chigumbura	5	159	53.00	50*
(Zimbabwe) Hamilton Masakadza	4	125	25.00	38
(Zimbabwe) Vusimuzi Sibanda	5	118	23.60	55

=== Bowling ===
Most wickets

Player	Matches	Wickets	Econ	BBI
(India) Amit Mishra	5	18	4.40	6/48
(India) Jaydev Unadkat	5	8	3.47	4/41
(India) Mohammed Shami	5	6	4.15	2/25
(India) Ravindra Jadeja	5	5	3.51	2/28
(Zimbabwe) Kyle Jarvis	3	4	4.92	2/18

== Broadcasting Rights ==
TV Broadcaster(s)	Country	Notes
TEN Sports	Pakistan; West Indies; Sri Lanka	
TEN Cricket	Bangladesh; India	
Super Sport	South Africa; Zimbabwe	Official Broadcasters of the tournament.
