= Indian cricket team in New Zealand in 2013–14 =

International cricket tour

	New Zealand	India
- Dates: 19 January 2014 – 18 February 2014
Captains	Brendon McCullum	Mahendra Singh Dhoni

Test series
- Result: New Zealand won the 2-match series 1–0
Most runs	Brendon McCullum (535)	Shikhar Dhawan (215)
Most wickets	Tim Southee, Neil Wagner (11)	Ishant Sharma (15)

One Day International series
- Results: New Zealand won the 5-match series 4–0
Most runs	Kane Williamson (361)	Virat Kohli (291)
Most wickets	Corey Anderson (10)	Mohammed Shami (11)

The India cricket team toured New Zealand, playing a five-match One Day International (ODI) series and two Test matches against the New Zealand national team from 19 January to 18 February 2014. New Zealand won both the Test (1–0) and ODI series (4–0).

== Squads ==
ODIs		Tests	
New Zealand	India	New Zealand	India
Brendon McCullum (c & wk); Kane Williamson (vc); Corey Anderson; Martin Guptill; Mitchell McClenaghan; Nathan McCullum; Kyle Mills; Adam Milne; James Neesham; Luke Ronchi (wk); Jesse Ryder; Tim Southee; Ross Taylor; Hamish Bennett	MS Dhoni (c & wk); Virat Kohli (vc); Rohit Sharma; Shikhar Dhawan; Ajinkya Rahane; Ambati Rayudu; Suresh Raina; Ravichandran Ashwin; Ravindra Jadeja; Bhuvneshwar Kumar; Mohammed Shami; Ishant Sharma; Amit Mishra; Ishwar Pandey; Stuart Binny; Varun Aaron	Brendon McCullum (c & wk); Kane Williamson (vc); Corey Anderson; Trent Boult; Doug Bracewell; Peter Fulton; Hamish Rutherford; Jesse Ryder; Ish Sodhi; Tim Southee; Ross Taylor; Neil Wagner; BJ Watling (wk); Tom Latham (wk)	MS Dhoni (c & wk); Virat Kohli (vc); Shikhar Dhawan; Murali Vijay; Rohit Sharma; Ajinkya Rahane; Ravindra Jadeja; Zaheer Khan; Mohammed Shami; Ishant Sharma; Ambati Rayudu; Bhuvneshwar Kumar; Ravichandran Ashwin; Umesh Yadav; Wriddhiman Saha (wk); Ishwar Pandey

== ODI series ==
=== 1st ODI ===
19 January 2014
14:00 (D/N)
Scorecard

New Zealand; 292/7 (50 overs)	v	India; 268 (48.4 overs)
Kane Williamson 71 (88); Mohammed Shami 4/55 (9 overs)		Virat Kohli 123 (111); Mitchell McClenaghan 4/68 (10 overs)

New Zealand won by 24 runs
McLean Park, Napier
Umpires: Rod Tucker (Aus) and Derek Walker (NZ)
Player of the match: Corey Anderson (NZ)

- India won the toss and elected to field.

=== 2nd ODI ===
22 January 2014
14:00 (D/N)
Scorecard

New Zealand; 271/7 (42 overs)	v	India; 277/9 (42 overs)
Kane Williamson 77 (87); Mohammed Shami 3/55 (7 overs)		Virat Kohli 78 (65); Tim Southee 4/72 (9 overs)

New Zealand won by 15 runs (D/L)
Seddon Park, Hamilton
Umpires: Chris Gaffaney (NZ) and Rod Tucker (Aus)
Player of the match: Kane Williamson (NZ)

- India won the toss and elected to field
- Rain reduced the match to 42 overs per side and revised India's target to 293 runs according to the Duckworth–Lewis method.
- With this defeat, India lost their ICC ODI Championship number-one ranking to Australia. However, with Australia's defeat against England in their 4th ODI on 24 January, India regained the number-one ranking.

=== 3rd ODI ===
25 January 2014
14:00 (D/N)
Scorecard

New Zealand; 314 (50 overs)	v	India; 314/9 (50 overs)
Martin Guptill 111 (129); Ravindra Jadeja 2/47 (10 overs)		Ravindra Jadeja 66* (45); Corey Anderson 5/63 (10 overs)

Match tied
Eden Park, Auckland
Umpires: Rod Tucker (Aus) and Billy Bowden (NZ)
Player of the match: Ravindra Jadeja (Ind)

- India won the toss and elected to field.
- This was 250th international match for MS Dhoni as both captain and wicket-keeper of India.
- Corey Anderson (NZ) claimed his maiden five-wicket haul in ODIs.
- India's number 6, 7 and 8 batsmen scored half-centuries, the first such instance in ODIs.

=== 4th ODI ===
28 January 2014
14:00 (D/N)
Scorecard

India; 278/5 (50 overs)	v	New Zealand; 280/3 (48.1 overs)
Mahendra Singh Dhoni 79* (73); Tim Southee 2/36 (10 overs)		Ross Taylor 112* (127); Mohammad Shami 1/61 (8 overs)

New Zealand won by 7 wickets
Seddon Park, Hamilton
Umpires: Gary Baxter (NZ) and Rod Tucker (Aus)
Player of the match: Ross Taylor (NZ)

- India won the toss and elected to bat.
- Stuart Binny made his ODI debut for India.

=== 5th ODI ===
31 January 2014
14:00 (D/N)
Scorecard

New Zealand; 303/5 (50 overs)	v	India; 216 (49.4 overs)
Ross Taylor 102 (106); Varun Aaron 2/60 (10 overs)		Virat Kohli 82 (78); Matt Henry 4/38 (10 overs)

New Zealand won by 87 runs
Westpac Stadium, Wellington
Umpires: Rod Tucker (Aus) and Billy Bowden (NZ)
Player of the match: Ross Taylor (NZ)

- India won the toss and elected to field
- Matt Henry made his ODI debut for New Zealand, and finished with the third-best debut figures for a New Zealand ODI player.

== Tour matches ==
2–3 February 2014
Scorecard

New Zealand XI	v	Indians
262/9d (78 overs); Robert O'Donnell 80 (124); Ishwar Pandey 3/42 (14 overs)		313/7 (93 overs); Ajinkya Rahane 60 (97); Shawn Hicks 1/8 (2 overs)

Match drawn
Cobham Oval, Whangārei
Umpires: Phil Jones (NZ) and Derek Walker (NZ)

- New Zealand XI won the toss and elected to bat.

== Test series ==
=== 1st Test ===
6–10 February 2014
Scorecard

New Zealand	v	India
503 (121.4 overs); Brendon McCullum 224 (307); Ishant Sharma 6/134 (33.4 overs)		202 (60 overs); Rohit Sharma 72 (120); Neil Wagner 4/64 (11 overs)
105 (41.2 overs); Ross Taylor 41 (73); Ishant Sharma 3/28 (10.2 overs)		366 (96.3 overs); Shikhar Dhawan 115 (211); Neil Wagner 4/62 (25 overs)

New Zealand won by 40 runs
Eden Park, Auckland
Umpires: Steve Davis (Aus) and Richard Kettleborough (Eng)
Player of the match: Brendon McCullum (NZ)

- India won the toss and elected to field.

=== 2nd Test ===
14–18 February 2014
Scorecard

New Zealand	v	India
192 (52.5 overs); Kane Williamson 47 (100); Ishant Sharma 6/51 (17 overs)		438 (102.4 overs); Ajinkya Rahane 118 (158); Tim Southee 3/93 (20 overs)
680/8d (210 overs); Brendon McCullum 302 (559); Zaheer Khan 5/170 (51 overs)		166/3 (52 overs); Virat Kohli 105* (135); Tim Southee 2/50 (16 overs)

Match drawn
Basin Reserve, Wellington
Umpires: Steve Davis (Aus) and Richard Kettleborough (Eng)
Player of the match: Brendon McCullum (NZ)

- India won the toss and elected to field.
- Zaheer Khan played his last international cricket match.
- Tom Latham and James Neesham (NZ) made Test debuts.
- Ajinkya Rahane (Ind) scored his first century in Tests.
- Brendon McCullum and BJ Watling (NZ) set a record for the highest sixth-wicket partnership in Tests (352 runs).
- James Neesham's 137* was the highest score on debut for a number eight batsman in a Test match.
- New Zealand's score of 680 for 8 was also a new record score for the third innings in Tests.
