= 2013 West Indies Tri-Series =

- Date: 28 June – 11 July 2013
- Location: Caribbean
- Result: India won the series
- Player of the series: Bhuvneshwar Kumar (Ind)
Teams
West Indies	India	Sri Lanka
Captains
Dwayne Bravo Kieron Pollard	MS Dhoni; Virat Kohli	Angelo Mathews
Most runs
Johnson Charles (185)	Rohit Sharma (217)	Upul Tharanga (223)
Most wickets
Kemar Roach (7)	Bhuvneshwar Kumar (10)	Rangana Herath (10)

The 2013 West Indies Tri-Series was a One Day International cricket tournament in the Caribbean that was held between India, Sri Lanka and the West Indies. The first round of group fixtures were held at Sabina Park, Kingston, Jamaica with the second round and the final held at Queen's Park Oval, Port of Spain, Trinidad. The series was named the Celkon Mobile Cup. India won the series after they defeated Sri Lanka in the final. Sri Lanka's Upul Tharanga scored the most runs in the series (223), while his teammate Rangana Herath and India's Bhuvneshwar Kumar picked the most wickets with 10; the latter was named the player of the series.

== Squads ==
West Indies	India	Sri Lanka
Dwayne Bravo (c); Chris Gayle; Johnson Charles; Darren Bravo; Marlon Samuels; Kieron Pollard; Devon Smith; Darren Sammy; Denesh Ramdin (wk); Sunil Narine; Tino Best; Ravi Rampaul; Kemar Roach	MS Dhoni (c) (wk); Shikhar Dhawan; Murali Vijay; Rohit Sharma; Virat Kohli; Dinesh Karthik (wk); Suresh Raina; Ravindra Jadeja; Ravichandran Ashwin; Bhuvneshwar Kumar; Ishant Sharma; Umesh Yadav; Irfan Pathan; Amit Mishra; Vinay Kumar	Angelo Mathews (c); Dinesh Chandimal (vc); Kusal Perera; Upul Tharanga; Kumar Sangakkara; Mahela Jayawardene; Lahiru Thirimanne; Jeevan Mendis; Lasith Malinga; Shaminda Eranga; Nuwan Kulasekara; Dilhara Lokuhettige; Rangana Herath; Sachithra Senanayake; Ajantha Mendis

== Matches ==
=== Points table ===
Pos	Team	Pld	W	L	Pts	NRR	Qualification
1	India	4	2	2	10	0.054	Advanced to the final
2	Sri Lanka	4	2	2	9	0.348	Advanced to the final
3	West Indies	4	2	2	9	−0.383	

Source: ESPNCricinfo

==== Round 1 ====
28 June
Scorecard

Sri Lanka; 208 (48.3 overs)	v	West Indies; 209/4 (37.5 overs)
Mahela Jayawardene 52 (52); Sunil Narine 4/40 (10 overs)		Chris Gayle 109 (100); Rangana Herath 1/37 (6 overs)

West Indies won by 6 wickets
Sabina Park, Kingston, Jamaica
Umpires: Ian Gould (Eng) and Joel Wilson (WI)
Player of the match: Chris Gayle (WI)

- West Indies won the toss and elected to field.

30 June
Scorecard

India; 229/7 (50 overs)	v	West Indies; 230/9 (47.4 overs)
Rohit Sharma 60 (89); Roach, Sammy 2/41 (10 overs)		Johnson Charles 97 (100); Umesh Yadav 3/43 (9.4 overs)

West Indies won by 1 wicket
Sabina Park, Kingston, Jamaica
Umpires: Ian Gould (Eng) and Peter Nero (WI)
Player of the match: Johnson Charles (WI)

- West Indies won the toss and elected to field.

2 July
Scorecard

Sri Lanka; 348/1 (50 overs)	v	India; 187 (44.5 overs)
Upul Tharanga 174* (159); Ravichandran Ashwin 1/66 (10 overs)		Ravindra Jadeja 49* (62); Rangana Herath 3/37 (10 overs)

Sri Lanka won by 161 runs
Sabina Park, Kingston, Jamaica
Umpires: Ian Gould (Eng) and Joel Wilson (WI)
Player of the match: Upul Tharanga (SL)

- India won the toss and elected to field.
- Virat Kohli (Ind) captained India for the first time in ODIs.

==== Round 2 ====
5 July
Scorecard

India; 311/7 (50 overs)	v	West Indies; 171 (34/39 overs)
Virat Kohli 102 (83); Tino Best 2/51 (10 overs)		Johnson Charles 45 (39); Bhuvneshwar Kumar 3/29 (8 overs)

India won by 102 runs (D/L method)
Queen's Park Oval, Port of Spain
Umpires: Nigel Llong (Eng) and Peter Nero (WI)
Player of the match: Virat Kohli (Ind)

- West Indies won the toss and elected to field.
- Rain reduced the West Indian innings to 39 overs.

7–8 July
Scorecard

Sri Lanka; 219/8 (41 overs)	v	West Indies; 190/9 (41 overs)
Kumar Sangakkara 90* (95); Kemar Roach 4/27 (8 overs)		Darren Bravo 70 (84); Angelo Mathews 4/29 (8 overs)

Sri Lanka won by 39 runs (D/L method)
Queen's Park Oval, Port of Spain
Umpires: Nigel Llong (Eng) and Joel Wilson (WI)
Player of the match: Kumar Sangakkara (SL)

- West Indies won the toss and elected to field.
- Rain halted Sri Lanka's innings after 19 overs on the first day and reduced both sides' innings to 41 overs on the second day.

9 July
Scorecard

India; 119/3 (29 overs)	v	Sri Lanka; 96 (24.4 overs)
Rohit Sharma 48* (83); Rangana Herath 2/32 (6 overs)		Dinesh Chandimal 26 (54); Bhuvneshwar Kumar 4/8 (6 overs)

India won by 81 runs (D/L method)
Queen's Park Oval, Port of Spain
Umpires: Nigel Llong (Eng) and Peter Nero (WI)
Player of the match: Bhuvneshwar Kumar (Ind)

- Sri Lanka won the toss and elected to field.
- Rain halted play during India's innings at 29 overs. Sri Lanka's innings reduced to 26 overs with a revised target of 178 after 26 overs.
- As a result of this match, India qualified for the finals and West Indies were eliminated.

=== Final ===
11 July
Scorecard

Sri Lanka; 201 (48.5 overs)	v	India; 203/9 (49.4 overs)
Kumar Sangakkara 71 (100); Ravindra Jadeja 4/23 (7.5 overs)		Rohit Sharma 58 (89); Rangana Herath 4/20 (10 overs)

India won by 1 wicket
Queen's Park Oval, Port of Spain
Umpires: Nigel Llong (Eng) and Peter Nero (WI)
Player of the match: Mahendra Singh Dhoni (Ind)

- India won the toss and elected to field.

== Statistics ==
=== Batting ===
Most runs

Player	Matches	Runs	Avg	HS
(Sri Lanka) Upul Tharanga	5	223	55.75	174*
(India) Rohit Sharma	5	217	54.25	60
(Sri Lanka) Mahela Jayawardene	5	199	39.80	107
(Cricket West Indies) Johnson Charles	4	185	46.25	97
(Sri Lanka) Kumar Sangakkara	5	178	59.33	90*

=== Bowling ===
Most wickets

Player	Matches	Wickets	Econ	BBI
(India) Bhuvneshwar Kumar	4	10	3.34	4/8
(Sri Lanka) Rangana Herath	4	10	3.93	4/20
(India) Ravindra Jadeja	5	8	4.86	4/23
(India) Ishant Sharma	5	8	5.70	2/17
(Sri Lanka) Angelo Mathews	5	7	3.41	4/29
(Cricket West Indies) Kemar Roach	4	7	5.08	4/27
(India) Umesh Yadav	4	7	5.50	3/32

== Broadcasting rights ==
TV Broadcaster(s)	Country	Notes
TEN Sports	Sri Lanka; West Indies; Pakistan; Bangladesh	Official Broadcasters of the tournament.
TEN Cricket	India	
DD National	India	Only Indian Matches
Sky Sports	United Kingdom	
SuperSport	South Africa	
Fox Sports	Australia	
