= Michael Chinouya =

Zimbabwean cricketer (born 1986)

Personal information
- Born: 9 June 1986 (age 40); Kwekwe, Zimbabwe
- Batting: Right-handed
- Bowling: Right-arm medium-fast
- Role: Bowler

International information
- National side: Zimbabwe
- Test debut (cap 97): 28 July 2016 v New Zealand
- Last Test: 6 August 2016 v New Zealand
- ODI debut (cap 117): 28 July 2013 v India
- Last ODI: 1 August 2013 v India
- Source: Cricinfo, 9 August 2014

Michael Chinouya (born 9 June 1986) is a Zimbabwean cricketer. He made his One Day International debut for Zimbabwe against India in July 2013. In July 2016 he was added to Zimbabwe's Test squad for their series against New Zealand. On 28 July 2016, he made his Test debut against New Zealand.
