= Indian cricket team in Bangladesh in 2015 =

International cricket tour

	Bangladesh	India
- Dates: 10 June 2015 – 24 June 2015
Captains	Mushfiqur Rahim (Test); Mashrafe Mortaza (ODIs)	Virat Kohli (Test); MS Dhoni (ODIs)

Test series
- Result: 1-match series drawn 0–0
Most runs	Imrul Kayes (79)	Shikhar Dhawan (173)
Most wickets	Shakib Al Hasan (4)	Ravichandran Ashwin (5)
- Player of the series: Shikhar Dhawan (Ind)

One Day International series
- Results: Bangladesh won the 3-match series 2–1
Most runs	Soumya Sarkar (128)	Shikhar Dhawan (158)
Most wickets	Mustafizur Rahman (13)	Ravichandran Ashwin (6)
- Player of the series: Mustafizur Rahman (Ban)

The Indian cricket team toured Bangladesh from 10 to 24 June 2015. The tour consisted of one Test match and three One Day International (ODI) matches. Because of the series taking place during monsoon season, each ODI had a reserve day allocated. The one-off Test finished in a draw and Bangladesh won the ODI series 2–1.

== Squads ==
On 4 June, Bangladesh's Mahmudullah was ruled out of the series after fracturing his finger in training. Two days later, India's KL Rahul was ruled out of the Test match because of illness.

Tests		ODIs	
Bangladesh	India	Bangladesh	India
Mushfiqur Rahim (c); Tamim Iqbal; Imrul Kayes; Mominul Haque; ~~Mahmudullah~~; Shakib Al Hasan; Soumya Sarkar; Shuvagata Hom; Taijul Islam; Mohammad Shahid; Rubel Hossain; Jubair Hossain; Litton Das; Abul Hasan	Virat Kohli (c); Murali Vijay; Shikhar Dhawan; ~~KL Rahul~~; Cheteshwar Pujara; Ajinkya Rahane; Rohit Sharma; Wriddhiman Saha (wk); Ravichandran Ashwin; Harbhajan Singh; Karn Sharma; Bhuvneshwar Kumar; Umesh Yadav; Varun Aaron; Ishant Sharma	Mashrafe Mortaza (c); Shakib Al Hasan (vc); Taskin Ahmed; Litton Das; Mominul Haque; Nasir Hossain; Rubel Hossain; Tamim Iqbal; Mushfiqur Rahim; Mustafizur Rahman; Sabbir Rahman; Soumya Sarkar; Arafat Sunny; Rony Talukdar	MS Dhoni (c, wk); Rohit Sharma; Ajinkya Rahane; Shikhar Dhawan; Virat Kohli; Suresh Raina; Ambati Rayudu; Ravichandran Ashwin; Ravindra Jadeja; Axar Patel; Bhuvneshwar Kumar; Umesh Yadav; Mohit Sharma; Stuart Binny; Dhawal Kulkarni

== Test series ==
=== Only Test ===
10–14 June 2015
Scorecard

India	v	Bangladesh
462/6d (103.3 overs); Shikhar Dhawan 173 (195); Shakib Al Hasan 4/105 (24.3 overs)		256 (65.5 overs); Imrul Kayes 72 (139); Ravichandran Ashwin 5/87 (25 overs)
		23/0 f/o (15 overs); Tamim Iqbal 16* (41)

Match drawn
Khan Shaheb Osman Ali Stadium, Fatullah
Umpires: Kumar Dharmasena (SL) and Nigel Llong (Eng)
Player of the match: Shikhar Dhawan (Ind)

- India won the toss and elected to bat.
- Rain stopped play on day 1 at 11:35 and lunch was taken. Play resumed at 15:30. No play was possible on day 2 because of rain. Rain disrupted most of the day on day 3, with play finishing early. Rain reduced day 4 to just 2 hours of play. Most of the first session on day 5 was lost because of rain.
- Litton Das (Ban) made his Test debut.
- Tamim Iqbal became the leading run-scorer in Tests for Bangladesh.

== ODI series ==
=== 1st ODI ===
18 June 2015
15:00 (D/N)
Scorecard

Bangladesh; 307 (49.4 overs)	v	India; 228 (46 overs)
Tamim Iqbal 60 (62); Ravichandran Ashwin 3/51 (10 overs)		Rohit Sharma 63 (68); Mustafizur Rahman 5/50 (9.2 overs)

Bangladesh won by 79 runs
Sher-e-Bangla National Cricket Stadium, Dhaka
Umpires: Enamul Haque (Ban) and Rod Tucker (Aus)
Player of the match: Mustafizur Rahman (Ban)

- Bangladesh won the toss and elected to bat.
- Rain interrupted the Bangladesh innings during the 16th over, but no play was lost.
- Litton Das and Mustafizur Rahman (both Ban) made their ODI debuts.
- This is Bangladesh's highest total against India in ODIs.
- Mustafizur Rahman (Ban) took a five-wicket haul on debut.

=== 2nd ODI ===
21 June 2015
14:00 (D/N)
Scorecard

India; 200 (45.0 overs)	v	Bangladesh; 200/4 (38.0 overs)
Shikhar Dhawan 53 (60); Mustafizur Rahman 6/43 (10 overs)		Shakib Al Hasan 51* (62); Ravichandran Ashwin 1/32 (10 overs)

Bangladesh won by 6 wickets (DLS method)
Sher-e-Bangla National Cricket Stadium, Dhaka
Umpires: Sharfuddoula (Ban) and Rod Tucker (Aus)
Player of the match: Mustafizur Rahman (Ban)

- India won the toss and elected to bat.
- Rain stopped play in the 44th over of India's innings with India at 196/8. The game was reduced 47 overs per-side, with Bangladesh being set a revised DLS target of 200 runs to win.
- Mustafizur Rahman (Ban) took a five-wicket haul on his second consecutive match.
- With this victory, Bangladesh qualified for the 2017 ICC Champions Trophy.

=== 3rd ODI ===
24 June 2015
14:00 (D/N)
Scorecard

India; 317/6 (50 overs)	v	Bangladesh; 240 (47 overs)
Shikhar Dhawan 75 (73); Mashrafe Mortaza 3/76 (10 overs)		Sabbir Rahman 43 (38); Suresh Raina 3/45 (8 overs)

India won by 77 runs
Sher-e-Bangla National Cricket Stadium, Dhaka
Umpires: Enamul Haque (Ban) and Rod Tucker (Aus)
Player of the match: Suresh Raina (Ind)

- Bangladesh won the toss and elected to field.

== Controversy ==
During the ODI match in Mirpur, Sudhir Kumar Chaudhary, an ardent fan of the Indian team, was attacked and harassed by Bangladesh fans booing against India, when he was trying to leave the stadium. He got scared but was eventually rescued by Bangladesh Police.
