= Shikhar Dhawan =

Indian cricketer (born 1985)

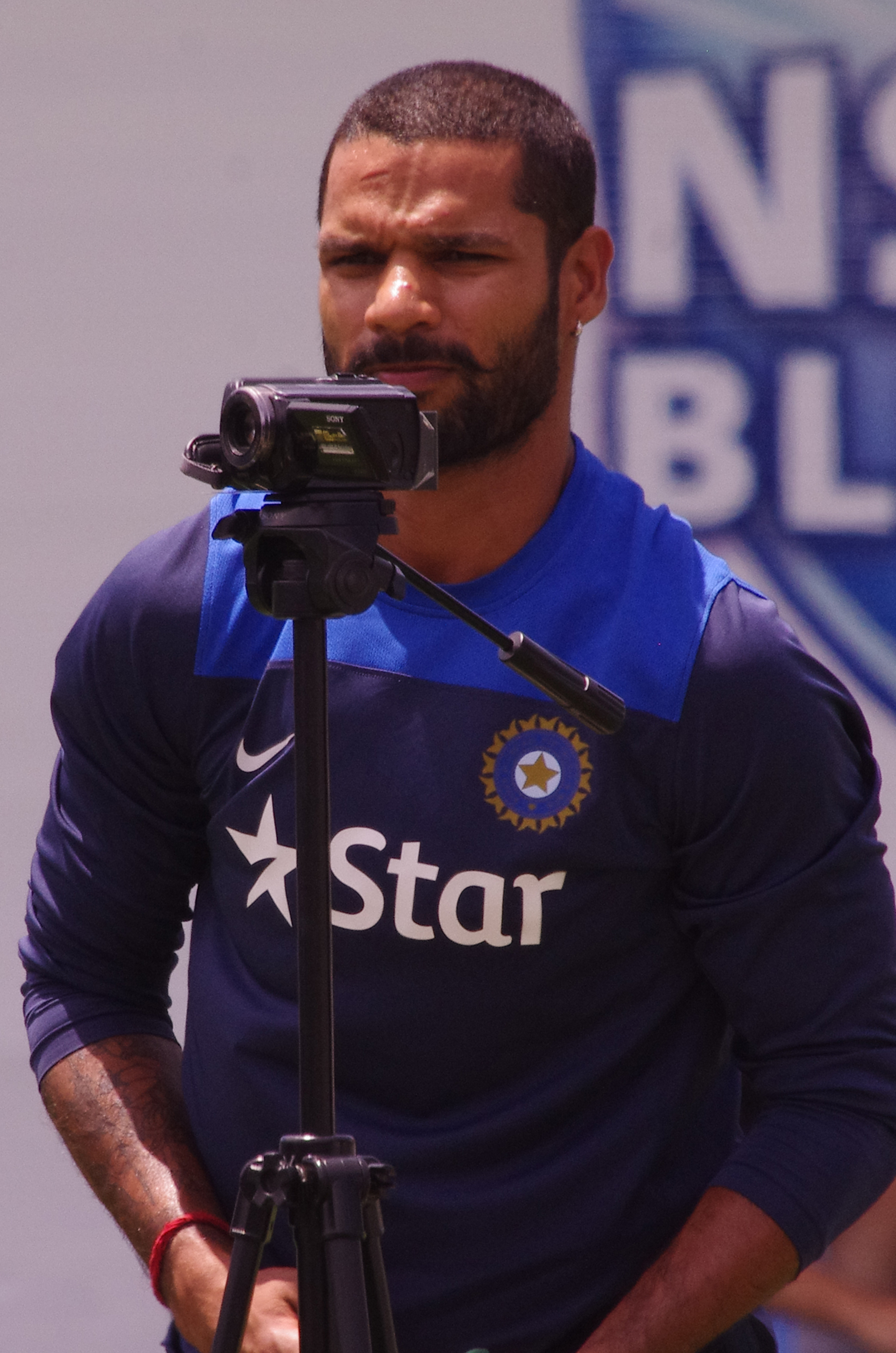
- Dhawan in 2014

Personal information
- Born: 5 December 1985 (age 40); New Delhi, India
- Nickname: Gabbar, Mr. ICC
- Batting: Left-handed
- Bowling: Right-arm off break
- Role: Opening batter

International information
- National side: India (2010–2022)
- Test debut (cap 277): 14 March 2013 v Australia
- Last Test: 7 September 2018 v England
- ODI debut (cap 188): 20 October 2010 v Australia
- Last ODI: 10 December 2022 v Bangladesh
- ODI shirt no.: 42 (previously 25)
- T20I debut (cap 36): 4 June 2011 v West Indies
- Last T20I: 29 July 2021 v Sri Lanka
- T20I shirt no.: 42 (previously 25)

Domestic team information
- Years: Team
- 2004–2024: Delhi
- 2008: Delhi Daredevils (squad no. 16)
- 2009–2010: Mumbai Indians (squad no. 16)
- 2011–2012: Deccan Chargers (squad no. 25)
- 2013–2018: Sunrisers Hyderabad (squad no. 25)
- 2019–2021: Delhi Capitals (squad no. 42)
- 2022–2024: Punjab Kings (squad no. 42)
- 2024: Karnali Yaks (squad no. 42)

Career statistics
Competition	Test	ODI	T20I	FC
Matches	34	167	68	122
Runs scored	2,315	6,793	1,759	8,499
Batting average	40.61	44.11	27.92	44.26
100s/50s	7/5	17/39	0/11	25/29
Top score	190	143	92	224
Balls bowled	54	–	–	298
Wickets	0	–	–	3
Bowling average	–	–	–	47.33
5 wickets in innings	–	–	–	0
10 wickets in match	–	–	–	0
Best bowling	–	–	–	2/30
Catches/stumpings	28/–	83/–	19/0	120/–
Medal record
Men's Cricket
Representing India
ICC Champions Trophy
Winner	2013 England and Wales
Runner-up	2017 England and Wales
ICC T20 World Cup
Runner-up	2014 Bangladesh
ACC Asia Cup
Winner	2016 Bangladesh
Winner	2018 United Arab Emirates
- Source: ESPNcricinfo, 15 December 2022

Shikhar Dhawan (born 5 December 1985) is an Indian former cricketer who played as an opening batter. He was a regular member of the Indian team in limited-overs formats for over a decade and represented Delhi in domestic cricket. He was the leading run scorer and Player of the Tournament in the 2013 ICC Champions Trophy as well as the leading run-scorer on the Indian national team at the 2015 World Cup. Across ICC World Cups and Champions Trophies, he averaged 65.15, the highest among players with over 1000 runs.

Dhawan made his One Day International (ODI) debut against Australia in October 2010 at Visakhapatnam. His Test debut came against the same opposition in March 2013 at Mohali, where he scored the fastest century by any batsman on Test debut (85 balls) and ended his innings with 187 runs from 174 balls. This is also the highest score by an Indian on a Test debut.

In August 2013, Dhawan scored 248 off 150 balls for India A against South Africa A in a List A match, which was then the second-highest individual score in the format. He later became the first Indian to score a century in his 100th ODI, during a match against South Africa in Johannesburg. On 14 June 2018, he scored a century before lunch on the opening day of a Test against Afghanistan. Dhawan also went through phases of inconsistent form, both in domestic and international cricket. On 24 August 2024, Dhawan announced his retirement from all forms of cricket.

== Early life ==
Dhawan was born on 5 December 1985 in Delhi, India to Sunaina and Mahendra Pal Dhawan. He completed his schooling at St. Mark's Senior Secondary Public School in Meera Bagh, Delhi. Since the age of 12, he trained at Sonnet Club under the guidance of coach Tarak Sinha, who has trained 12 international cricketers. Dhawan was a wicket-keeper when he first joined the club. Despite being a right hander who writes right handed, Dhawan learnt to bat left handed.

== Early career ==
=== Youth career ===
Dhawan first played for Delhi Under-16s in the 1999/00 Vijay Merchant Trophy and was the leading run-scorer of the 2000/01 Vijay Merchant Trophy in which Delhi finished runners-up. He scored 755 runs from 9 innings at an average of 83.88 with two centuries and a top score of 199. Dhawan was selected in the North Zone Under-16s squad for the Vijay Hazare Trophy in February 2001. He scored 30 and 66 in the semifinal against South Zone.

Dhawan's impressive performances for Delhi Under-16s were rewarded when he was picked in the India Under-17 squad for the 2000/01 ACC Under-17 Asia Cup. He played three games in the tournament averaging 85. Dhawan was subsequently drafted into the Delhi Under-19 team in October 2001, at the age of 15, for the Cooch Behar Trophy. In 2001/02 Vijay Merchant Trophy, Dhawan impressed once again with the bat by scoring 282 runs in 5 innings at an average of 70.50.

In October 2002, Dhawan was selected again in the Delhi Under-19 team for the Cooch Behar Trophy in which he made 388 runs from 8 innings at an average of 55.42 including two centuries. He was then picked to play for North Zone Under-19s in January 2003 in the Vinoo Mankad Trophy. Dhawan scored 45 and 12 in the semifinal against Central Zone, before top-scoring for his team with 71 in the final on a seaming track in Rohtak against East Zone securing his team an innings-win. In the CK Nayudu Trophy held in February 2003, Dhawan averaged 55.50 with the bat for North Zone Under-19s. He continued to amass runs at the Under-19 domestic level as he scored 444 runs from 6 innings at an average of 74 in the Cooch Behar Trophy in October after which he was made the captain of the Delhi Under-19 team. Dhawan averaged 66.66 in the MA Chidambaram Trophy held in December that year which was his first tournament as captain.

Dhawan played for India in the 2004 Under-19 World Cup in Bangladesh and finished as the leading run-scorer of the tournament scoring a total of 505 runs. Dhawan's runs came at an average of 84.16, with three centuries and a fifty, and was named Player of the Tournament. In the two youth Tests against England the following January, he had scores of 69, 18, and 41.

=== Early domestic career ===
Dhawan made his first-class debut for Delhi against Andhra in November 2004, in the 2004–05 season of the Ranji Trophy scoring 49 on his debut innings. He finished as Delhi's leading run-getter that Ranji season with a total of 461 runs from 6 matches and a high score of 130, scoring more runs than experienced players in the team like Ajay Jadeja and Aakash Chopra. In the Ranji One-day Trophy that followed, Dhawan made his List A debut against Jammu & Kashmir in January 2005. He then scored back-to-back unbeaten hundreds against Himachal Pradesh and Haryana. He was picked in the India Seniors squad for the Challenger Trophy in February, in which he opened the innings against India B with future India teammate MS Dhoni. In the second match, Dhawan scored a 124-ball 126, sharing a 246-run first-wicket partnership with Dhoni who also struck a century, helping India Seniors chase down 276 for the loss of two wickets. He was selected in the India A team to play in the one-off 50-over match against the touring Pakistani team in March that year. He scored 8 before being bowled by Naved-ul-Hasan.

In 2005/06 Challenger Trophy in October 2005, Dhawan played for India B and had a disappointing series with the bat. He had scores of 30, 40, and 26, unable to convert the starts into big knocks. He scored 117 for North Zone against Zimbabwe Cricket Union President's XI in the Duleep Trophy and 65 for Board President's XI in a three-day match against the touring Sri Lankan team. He averaged 34.40 in the 2005–06 Ranji season, but returned to form in the Ranji One-day Trophy scoring at an average of 40.75 from five games. Dhawan was drafted into the North Zone squad for Deodhar Trophy later that month where he continued to be in good form with scores of 56 against Central Zone, 65 against West Zone, 44 against South Zone and 5 against East Zone. North Zone went on to win the tournament and retain the trophy. Dhawan represented India A in the EurAsia Cricket Series in April–May 2006, a limited-overs tournament held at Abu Dhabi between India A, Ireland A, Netherlands A, Pakistan A and United Arab Emirates. He finished as the leading run-scorer of the tournament with 288 runs from 5 matches at an average of 72 including a hundred and two fifties.

Dhawan started the 2006-07 Ranji season with a century against Tamil Nadu, batting at number three. He was made captain of the Delhi team for the Ranji One-day Trophy in February 2007, despite the presence of international players in the lineup such as Virender Sehwag, Gautam Gambhir, Aakash Chopra and Ashish Nehra. Dhawan scored 161 runs in the tournament at an average of 32.20 with a top score of 46 while Delhi could not progress past the quarterfinals. He batted at four for North Zone in the Deodhar Trophy in February–March and averaged 23.66 from three innings.

Delhi won the 2007–08 season of Ranji Trophy in which Dhawan made 570 runs from 8 matches at an average of 43.84 including two hundreds. In the Duleep Trophy that followed, he averaged 42.25 in his three games for North Zone. He was the second-highest run-getter in the Vijay Hazare Trophy (earlier called Ranji One-day Trophy) in February–March 2008, accumulating 389 runs in 6 matches at an average of 97.25 with two hundreds and a strike rate of over 100. However, Dhawan lost his form during the Deodhar Trophy in March when he played for North Zone and made scores of 0, 1 and 5. He failed to make an impression playing for India A in a four-day match against New Zealand A in September as he scored 27 and 7.

Dhawan returned to form in the 2008–09 Ranji season with 415 runs at an average over 69, but had an indifferent run in the Vijay Hazare Trophy in February 2009 with an average of 18.80 in six innings.

Dhawan played for India Red in the Challenger Trophy in October 2009. He averaged 48.33 in that tournament which India Red won. His good form continued in the Ranji Trophy as he scored 224 in the season's opening match against Baroda and 100 in the second game against Karnataka. However, Dhawan suffered an injury in the third match which kept him on the sidelines for four weeks He returned to the team during the knockout stage and finished the Ranji season with a total of 451 runs from 6 innings averaging 75.16. In February 2010, Dhawan played five matches for Delhi in the Vijay Hazare Trophy and scored the most runs for his team, 327 runs at 81.75, including a century (155*) and two fifties, earning himself a spot in the North Zone team for Deodhar Trophy in March. He made an unbeaten 85 in the semifinal against East Zone and 48 in the final against West Zone, helping North Zone lift the trophy.

=== Inconsistent seasons ===
Dhawan was recalled in India A squad that toured England in June–July 2010. In the first game of the tour, a three-day match against Yorkshire, Dhawan scored 179 off 208 balls to help India A post 473/3d. Yorkshire was bowled out for 219 in their first innings and the match ended in a draw. In the limited-overs triangular series involving England Lions, India A, and West Indies A, Dhawan scored 166 runs from 4 innings at an average of 41.50 and a strike rate of 130.70.

Dhawan was selected in the Rest of India squad to play against the defending Ranji champions Mumbai in the Irani Cup in October 2010. He scored 83 in the first innings as the Rest of India won by 361 runs. He was then selected to play for India Blue in the Challengers Trophy. Dhawan was dismissed run out for a duck in the first game against India Red before he scored a 121-ball 109 in the second match against India Green. India Red beat India Green in the final at Indore where he scored 44. This string of strong performances earned him his maiden international call-up against Australia in October.

In November 2010, Dhawan returned to playing for Delhi in 2010–11 Ranji Trophy. He scored a total of 486 runs in 7 matches at an average of 44.18. He registered only one hundred in that season, a 149 against Gujarat at Delhi after Gujarat were bowled out for 71 in their first innings. After failing to make it to the Indian squad for the South African tour in December, he struggled with form in Duleep Trophy, Vijay Hazare Trophy and Deodhar Trophy.

After his poor performances in the West Indies, Dhawan was unable to find a place in the Indian squad that toured England later that year and resumed his domestic commitments. In October 2011, playing for the Rest of India against Rajasthan in the Irani Cup final at Jaipur, he scored 177 off 165 balls in the first innings and 155 off 126 balls in the second innings. The Rest of India went on to win the match by 404 runs, and Dhawan was awarded the man of the match for his efforts. He was out of form in the 2011–12 Ranji Trophy as he scored 296 runs at an average of 32.88 with no hundreds, while Delhi finished sixth in their seven-team group and could not progress to the knockout stage. Dhawan returned to form in the Vijay Hazare Trophy in February–March 2012, scoring 291 runs in eight matches at an average of 48.50 including three fifties. Delhi managed to reach the semifinal which they lost to Mumbai.

In June 2012, India A toured West Indies to play 3 four-day matches, 3 List A matches and two T20s against West Indies A, and Dhawan was included in India A squad. He struggled with the bat in the entire tour, failing to post a single fifty-plus score. He averaged 7.50 in the first two four-day matches before getting dropped from the team for the third game. In the two T20s, he averaged 27 with a strike rate of less than 100, and scored 49 runs in the two List A matches at an average of 24.50.

=== 2012–13 season ===
Dhawan was in sublime form at the start of the 2012–13 season. He played for India A in the Challenger Trophy in September–October 2012. In the first match against Bengal, he scored an unbeaten 99 to help India A chase down the target of 194 for the loss of two wickets and won the man of the match award. He scored a 139-ball 152 in the next match against India B, as India A won by 4 runs. In the final against India B, he scored 61, but India A were bowled out for 217 and fell short of the target by 139 runs. In the Duleep Trophy that followed, he was named the captain of the North Zone squad. He won the man of the match award in the quarterfinal match against West Zone, after scoring 101 and 50. In the semifinal against Central Zone, Dhawan scored 121 and 37.

Dhawan continued his good form in the 2012–13 Ranji Trophy, scoring 461 runs including two centuries at an average of 51.22. He was named the captain of Delhi for the one-off List A match against the touring England team in January 2013. He scored 110 off 109 balls in Delhi's run-chase of 295, helping Delhi win the match by 6 wickets. He was then selected in the Rest of India squad for 2013 Irani Cup match against Mumbai in February 2013. Opening the innings with Murali Vijay, he scored 63 and 0. The match ended in a draw, but Rest of India retained the title on first-innings lead.

== International career ==
=== Early years ===
In October 2010, the Indian selectors selected a "second string" squad for a three-match ODI series against Australia, in which Dhawan was picked in the 14-man squad which was the first occasion he featured in an Indian senior team squad. India captain Dhoni backed Dhawan before the series saying, "Both of us scored in the Challengers in Mumbai (in 2005). I got a chance to establish myself in the national team. There has been ups and downs in his career but he has been quite consistent. As an opener, it's quite tough, as you have Virender Sehwag, Sachin Tendulkar, and Gautam Gambhir all at the same level. It's good that he got a chance finally. Hope he scores and the bench will become stronger". Dhawan made his international debut, along with Saurabh Tiwary, in the second ODI at Visakhapatnam on 20 October. Australia, who batted first, made 289/3 in 50 overs, and Dhawan opened the innings for India in the run-chase. He did not score off the first delivery and was bowled off the second by Clint McKay.

In June 2011, India toured the West Indies for three Tests, five ODIs, and one T20I. India's regular openers in limited-overs, Sehwag and Gambhir were ruled out of the tour due to shoulder injuries, whereas Tendulkar decided to rest himself after the World Cup win and the IPL. The selectors picked Dhawan in the limited-overs squad in spite of his poor performance in the previous domestic season as he showed signs of returning to form during the IPL. He made his T20I debut against West Indies on 4 June at Port of Spain where he opened the innings with Parthiv Patel and was dismissed after an 11-ball 5. In the first match of the ODI series, playing the second ODI of his career, Dhawan scored 51 off 76 balls. India eventually chased down 215 with 4 wickets in hand. He had scores of 3, 4, and 11 in the other matches he played in the series.

=== Test debut and Champions Trophy ===
After consistent performances in the 2012–13 domestic season, Dhawan was rewarded with a call-up to the Indian Test squad in February 2013 for the four-match series against Australia. He was the third-choice opener in the squad which consisted of Test regulars Virender Sehwag and Murali Vijay. India chose Sehwag and Vijay over Dhawan in the first two Tests, after which Sehwag was dropped from the squad owing to his poor form. No replacement was named in the squad for Sehwag, which made Dhawan the favourite to take his place in the third Test. Dhawan made his Test debut in the Test at Mohali on 14 March, receiving the cap from Sachin Tendulkar who said to him: "We have known you as a very gutsy player in domestic cricket, now we hope to see you as a gutsy player in international cricket, so show us some guts." The first day of the match was washed out by rain, and Australia elected to bat first after winning the toss on the second day. Australia were bowled out for 408 on the morning of the third day. In reply, India opened the innings with Dhawan and Vijay. The duo batted out the rest of the third day taking India to 283 for no loss at stumps on the third day, with Dhawan batting on 185 and Vijay batting on 83. In the process, Dhawan scored the fastest century ever on Test debut, off 85 balls, breaking the long-held record of Gundappa Viswanath (137 vs Australia at Kanpur, 1969). Dhawan was dismissed for 187 (174 balls) in the second over of the fourth day, caught by Ed Cowan at silly point off the bowling of Nathan Lyon. He did not bat in India's second innings after suffering a hand injury while fielding during the fourth day. India went on to win the match by 6 wickets, and Dhawan won the man of the match award. The knock was later named as the Best Test Batting Performance of 2013 by ESPNcricinfo.

He missed the fourth Test at Delhi after being ruled out for six weeks due to a fracture in his left hand.

Dhawan made his comeback from injury during the 2013 Indian Premier League in a match for Sunrisers Hyderabad against Chennai Super Kings on 25 April and scored 63 runs from 45 balls. He played 10 matches that season and scored 311 runs at an average of 38.87 including three fifties. His good form helped him gain selection to the Indian ODI squad for the 2013 ICC Champions Trophy that was to be held in England in June. Dhawan opened the batting with Rohit Sharma in the tournament and the pair found success. In the tournament's opening match between India and South Africa at Cardiff, Dhawan scored his maiden ODI hundred—114 from 94 balls including 12 fours and a six. He shared an opening partnership of 127 runs with Sharma. India won and he was named the man of the match. His knock was nominated to be one of the best ODI batting performances of the year 2013 by ESPNcricinfo. In India's next match against West Indies, he scored an unbeaten 102 off 107 balls, his second ODI hundred, adding 101 for the first wicket with Rohit. India chased down the target of 234 for the loss of two wickets and more than 10 overs to spare. India's last group fixture was a rain-curtailed match at Birmingham against Pakistan, which India won by 8 wickets (D/L method). Dhawan scored 48 off 41 balls in this match. India topped the group table by winning all matches and qualified for the semifinals. In the semifinal match against Sri Lanka, he scored a 92-ball 68 which helped India win by 8 wickets with 15 overs to spare. This win took India to the final at Birmingham where they would face the hosts England. The final was reduced to 20-overs-a-side after rain delayed the start of play. India batted first and made 129/7 with Dhawan scoring 31 runs off 24 balls. India went on to win the match by 5 runs. Dhawan, who scored 363 runs from 5 matches at an average of 90.75 and a strike rate of over 100, won the Golden Bat award for scoring the most runs in the tournament and was also named player of the tournament. He was also named as part of the 'Team of the Tournament' by the ICC and ESPNcricinfo. Dhawan was 5 runs shy of the 7500 mark in T20s before IPL 2020 Match 30. 34-year-old Dhawan achieved the milestone in his 267th T20 and 264th innings.

=== Big Match Player ===
The Indian team then went to the West Indies for a triangular series against West Indies and Sri Lanka. Dhawan scored 135 runs in five games at an average of 27. His only half-century in the series came against West Indies at Port of Spain where he made 69 off 77 balls. India won the series by beating Sri Lanka in the final in which he scored 16. In July–August, India toured Zimbabwe for five ODIs, resting several first-choice players, under the captaincy of Virat Kohli. Dhawan scored a total of 209 runs in four matches at an average of 52.25 and finished as the leading run-getter of the series, while India won the series 5–0. In the second match at Harare, he scored his third ODI century. He was awarded the man of the match for his innings of 116 which helped India post 294/8 after being 65/4 in the 17th over.

"I haven't seen a better innings in one-day cricket than this one. The way he batted today, I thought he would get 300. They were clean hits, all proper cricketing shots. He pulled, he cut, he drove. He played all shots today and it was a real treat to watch."

— India A coach Lalchand Rajput on Dhawan's knock of 248

In August 2013, he played for India A on its tour of South Africa. He continued to be in good form in the triangular series against South Africa A and Australia A. He recorded the second-highest List A innings of all time by scoring 248 runs off 150 balls against South Africa A in the last group match of the series at Pretoria, the winner of which would play Australia A in the final. His innings included 30 fours and seven sixes and helped India A put up 433/3 on board and win the match by 39 runs. After the match, South Africa A captain Justin Ontong described Dhawan's knock as "the best one-day innings" he had ever seen, and added "Every shot he hit found the gap or went over the fielders. It was like watching a highlights package. He hit so many good shots, it's hard to pick out one that stood out. There were a few sixes that went into the construction site." Dhawan then scored 62 in the final against Australia A as India A clinched the series with a 50-run win. He finished as the highest run-getter of the series, scoring 410 runs at an average of 102.50 and a strike rate of over 135.

Australia toured India in October and November 2013 for one T20I and seven ODIs. Dhawan scored a personal best 32 in the T20I game which India won. In the ODIs, he scored 284 runs in 6 innings at an average of 56.80 and was involved in three century opening stands with Rohit Sharma. In the second ODI at Jaipur, Dhawan scored 95 off 86 balls to help India chase down the target of 360 for the loss of just one wicket, the second-highest successful run-chase in the history of ODI cricket. In the sixth game at Nagpur, he scored a 102-ball 100, his fourth ODI century, which helped India successfully chase Australia's total of 350. He was dismissed for 60 in the final match at Bangalore which India won to clinch the series. In November 2013, after being unable to convert starts into big knocks in the two-match Test series and the first two ODIs against West Indies, Dhawan scored a match-winning 119 off just 95 balls in the series-deciding third ODI at Kanpur and was named player of the match.

For his performances in 2013, he was named in the World ODI XI by the ICC. He was also named in the ODI XI by ESPNcricinfo for his performances in 2013.

=== Struggle with form ===
India toured South Africa in December 2013 to play 3 ODIs and 2 Tests. In the first ODI played at New Wanderers Stadium, Johannesburg, South Africa made 358 runs while batting first. Dhawan made 12 runs from 13 balls. In the second match, he got out for a duck while chasing 281 runs. The 3rd ODI was washed out by rain and lost the series 2–0. This broke India's record 6 straight ODI series win. The ODIs were followed by 2 tests. Dhawan continued his poor run, scoring only 13 and 15 in the first match played at New Wanderers Stadium. In the second match played at Kingsmead, Durban he got starts in both innings as he made scores of 29 and 19 but fails to convert them into big scores.

In January 2014, India went to New Zealand to play 5 ODIs & 2 Tests. In the first ODI played at McLean Park, Napier while chasing 293 runs Dhawan made 32 runs before getting out by Corey Anderson. He scored 12 and 28 runs in the next two matches before getting dropped for the first time in a year. He came back for the last match but made only 9 runs. In the first Test match played at Eden Park, Auckland Dhawan got out for a duck in first innings, But he scored his 2nd Test century in the 2nd innings. This came after a very long time as he had been out of form. In the Second Test, he scored 98 runs in the first innings but got out for only 2 runs in the second innings as the match ended in a draw.

Dhawan did not have a great start to 2014 Asia Cup where he made only 28 runs in the first match against Bangladesh but he made 94 runs against Sri Lanka in India's next match. He also made 60 runs against Afghanistan. India wins only 2 matches and failed to make it to the final. Dhawan finished the tournament with 192 runs.

He was also part of India's 15-man squad for 2014 World T20 where he played 3 matches. In the first match against Pakistan, he made 30 runs off 24 balls and gave India a good start while chasing 132 runs. He played two more matches in the tournament against West Indies and Bangladesh, respectively. However, India won all 3 matches but Dhawan failed to score big runs and being dropped from the team. India made it to the final where they lost to Sri Lanka.

Dhawan was selected in India's 18-man squad to play five Test matches against England. After showing good form in the practise match where he made 60 runs, he was selected in final playing XI for the first test match to be played at Trent Bridge, Nottingham. He made 12 runs in the first innings and 29 runs in the second. His bad form from the first match continued in the next two matches as he made scores of 7, 31, 6 & 37 in the four innings resulting in him being dropped from the team for the next two matches in favour of returning Gautam Gambhir.

He was also part of the ODI and T20 squad. The first ODI was washed out by rain. He suffered with bad form in the next two matches before returning to form in the 4th match with an unbeaten 97 which included 11 fours and 4 sixes. In the same match, he put on 183 runs opening stand with Ajinkya Rahane who scored a Hundred. He made 31 runs in the 5th ODI as India won the 5 match series 3–1 and Dhawan finished the series as the second-highest run scorer. He also played the lone T20 where he made 32 runs but India lost the match by 3 runs in the last over.

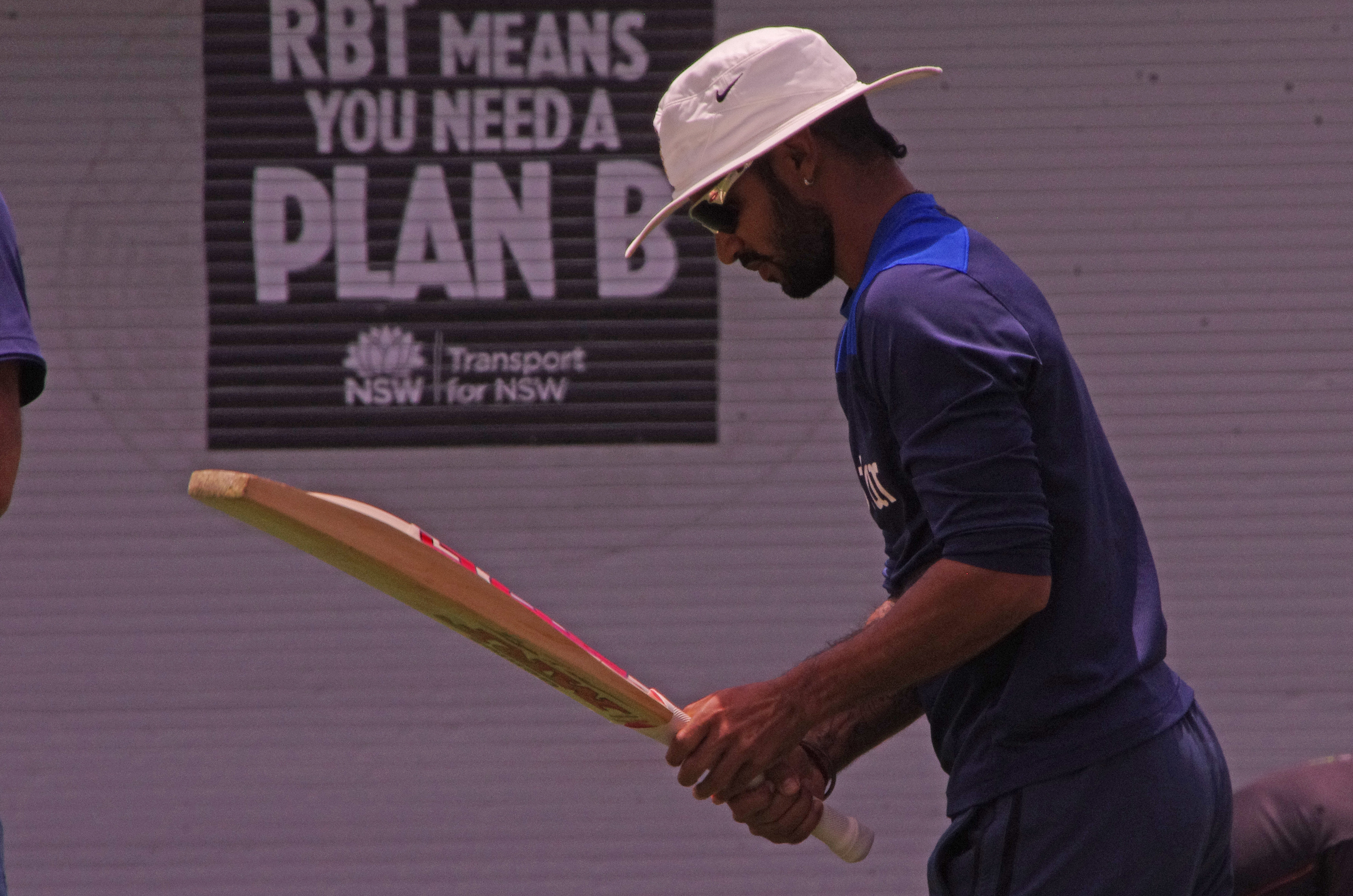
Dhawan during a practice session in January 2015

West Indies tour India in October 2014 to play 5 ODIs, 3 Tests and 1 T20. Dhawan was part of ODI squad where he played in the first match and 68 runs; however, India lost the match while chasing 338 runs. He scored 35 off 35 in the 4th match and India won the match and the series 2–1 as the 3rd and 5th ODI were cancelled. After the 4th ODI, the whole tour was cancelled by the West Indies Cricket Board.

Sri Lanka then agreed to tour India in November 2014 to play 5 ODIs. Dhawan was part of squad announced for first 3 ODIs. In the first match played at Cuttak he made 113 runs and put on 231 runs Opening stand with Ajinkya Rahane. He made 79 runs off 80 balls in the second match and 91 off 79 in the third match. He was rested for remaining 2 matches and was replaced by returning Rohit Sharma. India won the series 5-0 and Dhawan finished the series as the third-highest run scorer.

Dhawan made a comeback into the Test team in 2014 Border-Gavaskar Test series where he played in the first match at Adelaide Oval and made 25 runs in the first inning and 9 runs in the second innings. In the second match played at the Gabba, Brisbane he made 24 runs in the first innings and put on 56 runs opening stand with Murali Vijay. He made 81 runs off 145 in the second innings. In the third match at Melbourne, he made 28 runs in the first inning but followed it up with a duck in the second innings. He was dropped from the last test due to poor form.

His poor form continued in 2015 Cartlon Mid ODI Tri Series against Australia and England. In India's first match against Australia, he made only 2 runs off 4 balls. He made scores of 1 and 8 in next two matches before showing some sign of returning to form in the last Match against England, where he made 38 runs and put 83 runs opening stand with Ajinkya Rahane who made 73 runs. He made a fifty in the World Cup warm-up match against Australia.

Dhawan had a great start to the 2015 World Cup with a 73 against Pakistan in the first match and was run out. He made a hundred against South Africa in next match, scoring 137 off 146 balls which is also his second-highest score in ODIs. He made 14 runs against UAE and 9 runs against West Indies in India's next two matches of the tournament. He scored his second hundred of the tournament in the next match against Ireland which came off just 85 balls. He scored only 10 runs against Zimbabwe. India won all their group matches and topped the Group B table with 12 points. In India's next match against Bangladesh in the Quarterfinal, Dhawan scored 30 runs off 38 balls and India won the match and advanced to the semifinal where Dhawan made 45 runs off 41 balls but India lost the match and failed to qualify for the Final. Dhawan finished the tournament as the fifth-highest run scorer with 412 runs at an average of 51.50 and strike rate of 91.75. He was also named in the 'Team of the tournament' by Cricbuzz and a reserve player in the ESPNcricinfo XI.

Dhawan made a comeback into the test side in June 2015 by scoring 173 in the first inning of the only test match against Bangladesh. It was followed by a 3-match ODI series where he was top-scorer with 160 runs.

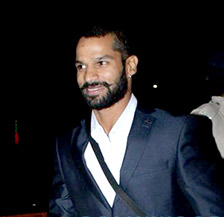
Dhawan in January 2016

During the India tour of Sri Lanka in August 2015, Dhawan followed up his good form with a 134 in the first Test. With this, he also became only the third Indian opener after Sunil Gavaskar and Rahul Dravid to score back-to-back test hundred in away Tests. During the match, he fracturing his right hand while fielding in the slips and was ruled out of the tour.

He was also named as part of the 'Team of the Tournament' at the 2017 Champions Trophy by the ICC, ESPNcricinfo and Cricbuzz.

On 10 February 2018 against South Africa Dhawan played in his 100th ODI, scored his 13th ODI century and became the first batsman for India to score a century in his 100th ODI. After this match, he became the most prolific run-getter for India at the end of 100th ODI.

=== Recall to Indian team ===
Following his good domestic performances, Dhawan was recalled to the India ODI squad for the Champions Trophy starting June 2017. He marked his return in the first game of the tournament, on 5 June, against Pakistan, scoring 68 off 65 balls, helping his team win the game. Three days later, he scored a record-equalling three Champions Trophy century, 125 runs off 128 balls, against Sri Lanka in a losing cause. He tied with Chris Gayle, Herschelle Gibbs and Sourav Ganguly for most centuries in the Champions Trophy. He also became the fastest to pass 500 runs in the tournament's history, taking him only 7 matches; also becoming the quickest to achieve this milestone in any ICC Major tournament. His 78 against South Africa a few days later helped his team beat them by eight wickets. Following the subsequent final loss to Pakistan, Dhawan was awarded the golden bat for scoring the most runs (338) in the tournament. He became the first and only batter to not only win 2 Golden Bats in the ICC Champions Trophy but also 2 consecutive Golden Bats (he also won it in 2013). He carried forward his good form in the tour of West Indies, scoring two consecutive half-centuries in the first two matches of the five-match ODI series, that India won 3–1.

In the 2017 India tour of Sri Lanka, Dhawan helped India to win the 3-match test series 3–0 by scoring two centuries and 358 runs, he was named the player of the series for his batting performances. He carried his good form in the ODI series by scoring a century in the first match which India won. On 2 September, it was announced that he would not be part of the team for the last ODI and the only T20I for personal reasons. India later went on to win the ODI series 5–0 and the only T20I. In the 2017 Australia tour of India, Dhawan was released from the Indian squad and missed the all five ODI's of the 5-match ODI series against Australia for personal reasons. He was recalled for the 3-match T20I series against Australia. On 1 November 2017, Dhawan scored his highest-ever T20I score of 80 runs off just 52 balls against New Zealand in a 53 run victory to take a lead of 1–0 in the T20I series. On 17 December, Dhawan scored his 12th ODI century against Sri Lanka and became fifth quickest batsman to reach 4000 runs in ODIs. He was awarded the player of the series for scoring one half century and a century in the 3-match ODI series. He was also named in the ODI XI of the year by Cricbuzz.

On 10 February 2018, against South Africa, Dhawan played in his 100th ODI, scored his 13th ODI century and became the first batsman for India to score a century in his 100th ODI. After this match, he became the most prolific run-getter for India at the end of 100th ODI. He scored 323 runs in six ODIs as India won the series of 5–1. In the T20I series Dhawan scored most runs, with 143 runs at an average of 47.67 and a strike rate of 156.76. On 25 February 2018, he was named vice-captain of India for the T20 Tri-series in Sri Lanka. On 14 June 2018, Dhawan became the only Indian and sixth overall player to score a century before lunch on the first day of a Test match, against Afghanistan in their first ever Test.

Dhawan was awarded the Player of the Series for scoring 117 runs in 2 innings, at an average of 58.50, with scores of a 76 (from 42 balls) and 41 (from 22), in the T20I series of India tour of Australia 2018/19, as India drew the 3-match series 1–1. In 2018, he scored the most runs in T20Is by any cricketer, with 689 runs. He was also named in the ODI and T20 Team of the year 2018 by Cricbuzz. In April 2019, he was named in India's squad for the 2019 Cricket World Cup. On 9 June, he scored his 17th century, against Australia, despite a thumb injury and was awarded player of the match. Later it was announced that he had fractured his thumb and was ruled out for at least three weeks. On 19 June 2019, the Board of Control for Cricket in India (BCCI) confirmed that Dhawan had been ruled out for the rest of the tournament, with Rishabh Pant confirmed as his replacement.

In June 2021, Dhawan was named India's captain for their ODI and T20I matches against Sri Lanka. In the opening match of the series, Dhawan scored 86 runs and completed 6,000 runs in ODI cricket. However, in the second match the skipper was only able to score 29 off 38 balls.

In July 2022, he was named as India's captain for the away ODI series against the West Indies. Later the same month, in the opening game against England, Dhawan played in his 150th ODI match.

== Indian Premier League ==
Dhawan was selected captain of the Sunrisers Hyderabad team prior to the start of the 2013 Champions League Twenty20 tournament.

Dhawan was retained by Sunrisers Hyderabad for the 2017 Indian Premier League. He scored 479 runs in 14 matches at an average of 36.84 in the tournament. His side were knocked out by the Kolkata Knight Riders in the playoffs.

In the 2018 IPL Auction, Dhawan was bought by Sunrisers Hyderabad for ₹ 5.2 crores using their RTM (right to match) card. In the 2018 Indian Premier League, he scored 497 runs, his side finished runners-up after losing to Chennai Super Kings in the final. He was traded to Delhi Capitals for the 2019 season. For Dhawan's performances in the 2019 IPL season, he was named in the ESPNcricinfo IPL XI. On 20 October 2020, Dhawan became the first batsman in the history of Indian Premier League (IPL) to score back-to-back hundreds and on the same day, he became the fifth batsman to cross the 5000 runs mark in the Indian Premier League (IPL) after David Warner. Dhawan, 34, is the 3rd in the list of top run scorers in IPL 2020. Dhawan completed 600 runs in IPL 2020.

Dhawan joined KL Rahul in reaching 600 runs in the IPL 2020 edition.

He scored 587 runs in IPL 2021, finishing fourth in the orange cap list.

In the 2022 IPL Auction, Dhawan was bought by the Punjab Kings for ₹ 8.25 crores. On 25 April 2022 in a match against the Chennai Super Kings, Dhawan accomplished 2 big milestones. He played his 200th match of the Tata IPL and achieved the 6000 run milestone becoming the 2nd player to do so after Virat Kohli.

Dhawan had been announced as the new skipper of Punjab Kings, replacing Mayank Agarwal for the 2023 edition.

Shikhar Dhawan IPL Teams and Runs
Season	Year	Team	Runs
1	2008	Delhi Daredevils	340
2	2009	Mumbai Indians	40
3	2010	Mumbai Indians	191
4	2011	Deccan Chargers	400
5	2012	Deccan Chargers	569
6	2013	Sunrisers Hyderabad	311
7	2014	Sunrisers Hyderabad	377
8	2015	Sunrisers Hyderabad	353
9	2016	Sunrisers Hyderabad	501
10	2017	Sunrisers Hyderabad	479
11	2018	Sunrisers Hyderabad	496
12	2019	Delhi Capitals	521
13	2020	Delhi Capitals	618
14	2021	Delhi Capitals	587
15	2022	Punjab Kings	460
16	2023	Punjab Kings	373
17	2024	Punjab Kings	152

== Nepal Premier League ==
Shikhar Dhawan played for Karnali Yaks in 2024 Nepal Premier League. In December 2024, Dhawan scored his maiden fifty in Nepal Premier League.

== International centuries ==
Dhawan, a left-handed opening batsman, he has made 24 centuries in international cricket – 7 in Test cricket and 17 in One Day Internationals (ODIs) – as of January 2020 and currently sits fifty-sixth in the list of century-makers in international cricket.

Dhawan made his Test debut against Australia at the Punjab Cricket Association IS Bindra Stadium, Chandigarh, in March 2013. He scored 187 and became the thirteenth Indian to score a century on Test debut. (Note: It is the sixth-highest score on Test debut and the second-highest by an opening batsman.) His highest score of 190 was made against Sri Lanka at the Galle International Stadium, Galle in July 2017.

Dhawan made his One Day International (ODI) debut against Australia at the Dr. Y. S. Rajasekhara Reddy ACA–VDCA Cricket Stadium, Visakhapatnam, in October 2010. He scored his first ODI century against South Africa at Sophia Gardens, Cardiff in the opening match of the 2013 ICC Champions Trophy, scoring 114. His highest score of 143 in ODIs came against Australia on 10 March 2019 at the Punjab Cricket Association IS Bindra Stadium, Chandigarh.

Dhawan made his Twenty20 International (T20I) debut against the West Indies in June 2011 at the Queen's Park Oval, Port of Spain. As of March 2019, he is yet to score a century in the format, with his highest score being 92, also against the West Indies, at the M. A. Chidambaram Stadium, Chennai in November 2018.

Test centuries
No.	Score	Opponents	Venue	Date	Result	Ref
1	187	Australia	Punjab Cricket Association IS Bindra Stadium, Chandigarh	14 March 2013	India won	
2	115	New Zealand	Eden Park, Auckland	6 February 2014	New Zealand won	
3	173	Bangladesh	Fatullah Osmani Stadium, Fatullah	10 June 2015	Drawn	
4	134	Sri Lanka	Galle International Stadium, Galle	12 August 2015	Sri Lanka won	
5	190	Sri Lanka	Galle International Stadium, Galle	26 July 2017	India won	
6	119	Sri Lanka	Pallekele International Cricket Stadium, Kandy	12 August 2017	India won	
7	107	Afghanistan	M. Chinnaswamy Stadium, Bengaluru	14 June 2018	India won	

ODI centuries
No.	Score	Opponents	Venue	Date	Result	Ref
1	114	South Africa	Sophia Gardens, Cardiff	6 June 2013	India won	
2	102 *	West Indies	The Oval, London	11 June 2013	India won	
3	116	Zimbabwe	Harare Sports Club, Harare	26 July 2013	India won	
4	100	Australia	Vidarbha Cricket Association Ground, Nagpur	30 October 2013	India won	
5	119	West Indies	Green Park, Kanpur	27 November 2013	India won	
6	113	Sri Lanka	Barabati Stadium, Cuttack	2 November 2014	India won	
7	137	South Africa	Melbourne Cricket Ground, Melbourne	22 February 2015	India won	
8	100	Ireland	Seddon Park, Hamilton	10 March 2015	India won	
9	126	Australia	Manuka Oval, Canberra	20 January 2016	Australia won	
10	125	Sri Lanka	The Oval, London	8 June 2017	Sri Lanka won	
11	132 *	Sri Lanka	Rangiri Dambulla International Stadium, Dambulla	20 August 2017	India won	
12	100 *	Sri Lanka	ACA–VDCA Cricket Stadium, Visakhapatnam	17 December 2017	India won	
13	109	South Africa	Wanderers Stadium, Johannesburg	10 February 2018	South Africa won	
14	127	Hong Kong	Dubai International Cricket Stadium, Dubai	18 September 2018	India won	
15	114	Pakistan	Dubai International Cricket Stadium, Dubai	23 September 2018	India won	
16	143	Australia	Punjab Cricket Association IS Bindra Stadium, Chandigarh	10 March 2019	Australia won	
17	117	Australia	The Oval, London	9 June 2019	India won	

== Awards and achievements ==
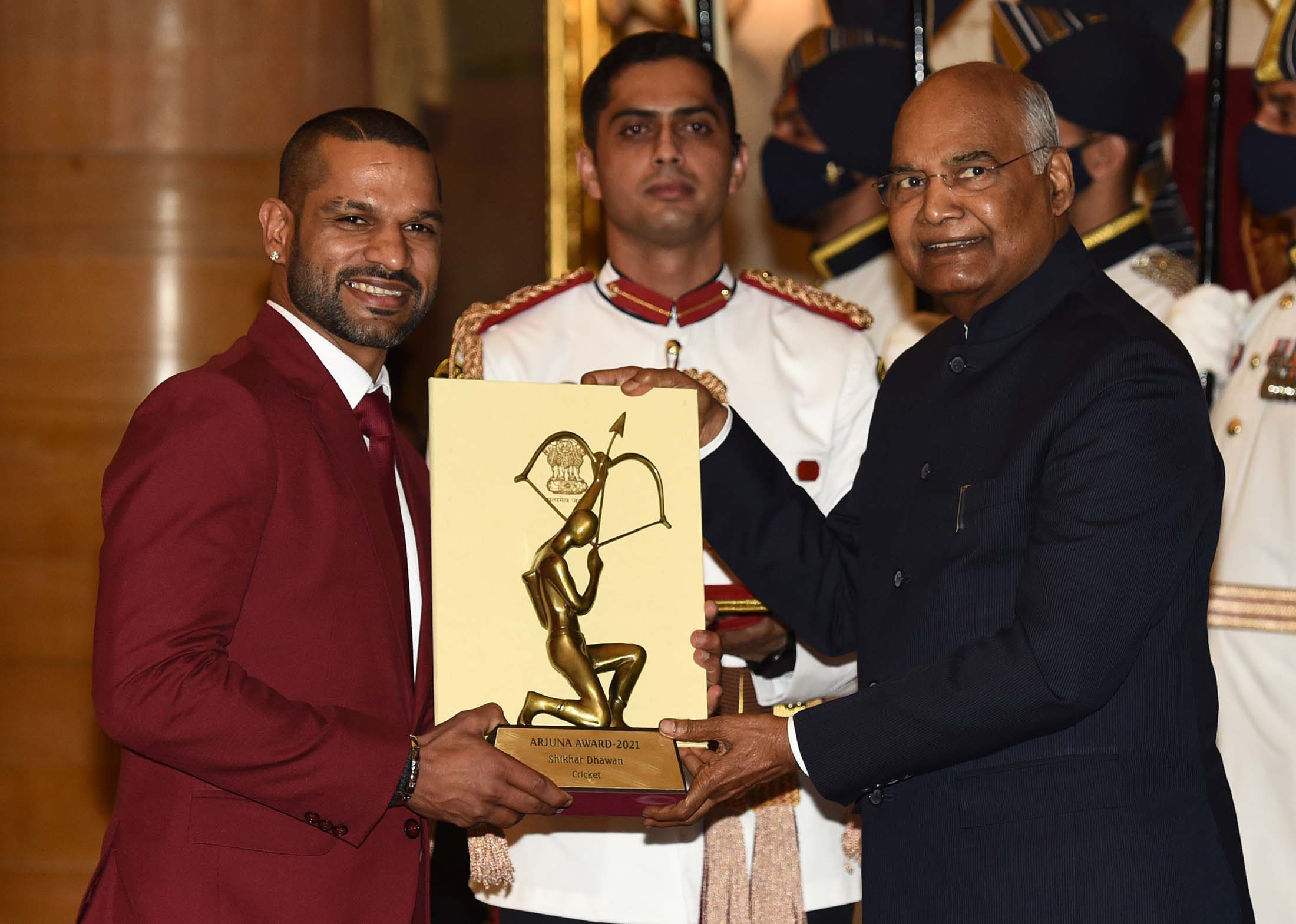
Ram Nath Kovind presenting the Arjuna Award to Shikhar Dhawan

ICC World ODI XI: 2013

- Fastest Test Century by a Debutant 187 off 174
- Leading run scorer for India in ICC World Cup 2015
- Man of the tournament at the 2013 ICC Champions Trophy; he won the tournament as a squad member of India.
- Golden Bat at the 2013 ICC Champions Trophy for scoring the most runs at the tournament.
- Golden Bat at the 2017 ICC Champions Trophy for scoring the most runs at the tournament.
- Only player to get 2 golden bats at the ICC Champions Trophy
- Only player to get 2 consecutive golden bats at ICC Champions Trophy
- Wisden Cricketer of the year 2014
- First Indian batsman to score a century before lunch of first day in a Test match
- Fastest Indian batsman to reach 1000 (Joint-fastest), 2000, 3000 ODI runs
- Fastest batsman to reach 1000 runs in ICC tournaments
- Highest run scorer of Asia Cup 2018
- During IPL 2020 Dhawan became the first player in history of the league to score two consecutive centuries.
- 2021-Arjuna Award, by the Government of India in recognition of his outstanding achievement in sports.
- Player with joint-most centuries in ICC Champions Trophy.

== Personal life ==
In 2008, Dhawan became engaged to Melbourne-based Aesha Mukerji, an experienced kickboxer, who he later married in 2012. Mukherjee was introduced to Dhawan by Harbhajan Singh . She is 12 years older than Dhawan, and was a mother of two daughters from her previous marriage. In December 2014, she gave birth to a son named Zoravar. Dhawan has also adopted Aesha's daughters, Aliyah and Rhea. In July 2019, Dhawan listed his family home in Melbourne's outer south-east. Shikhar Dhawan lived with his family in Clyde North home since 2015. Dhawan and Mukerji ended their marriage in September 2021. Shikhar Dhawan was granted divorce on 5 October 2023 on grounds of "mental cruelty" by estranged wife Aesha Mukerji and visitation rights to his son and allowed to chat with his son over video call. In May 2025, he confirmed his relationship with Irish professional product consultant Sophie Shine. Later, both of them got married in a private ceremony held in Delhi on 21 February 2026.
