= Indian cricket team in South Africa in 2013–14 =

Indian cricket team in South Africa in 2013
	South Africa	India
- Dates: 5 December 2013 – 30 December 2013
Captains	Graeme Smith (Tests); AB de Villiers (ODIs)	Mahendra Singh Dhoni (Tests & ODIs)

Test series
- Result: South Africa won the 2-match series 1–0
Most runs	Faf du Plessis (197)	Cheteshwar Pujara (280)
Most wickets	Dale Steyn & Vernon Philander (10)	Zaheer Khan (7)
- Player of the series: AB de Villiers (SA)

One Day International series
- Results: South Africa won the 3-match series 2–0
Most runs	Quinton de Kock (342)	Mahendra Singh Dhoni (84)
Most wickets	Dale Steyn (6)	Mohammed Shami (9)
- Player of the series: Quinton de Kock (SA)

The Indian cricket team toured South Africa from 5 to 30 December 2013, playing three One Day Internationals (ODI) and the two Test matches against the hosts. The Indian team was led by MS Dhoni while South Africa was captained by AB de Villiers (for ODIs) and Graeme Smith (for Tests). The tour began with the three-match ODI series, with South Africa winning the series 2–0. (Note: The third ODI was abandoned) Quinton de Kock, South Africa's wicket-keeper, became the fifth player in history to score three centuries in consecutive innings of ODIs. South Africa won the Test series 1–0, the first Test ending in a draw. Jacques Kallis, South Africa's most prolific run-scorer in Tests, announced his retirement from the format after the second Test at Durban.

== Squads ==
ODIs		Tests	
South Africa	India	South Africa	India
AB de Villiers (c); Hashim Amla; Quinton de Kock (wk); Jean-Paul Duminy; Imran Tahir; Jacques Kallis; Ryan McLaren; David Miller; Morne Morkel; Wayne Parnell; Vernon Philander; Graeme Smith; Dale Steyn; Lonwabo Tsotsobe	MS Dhoni (c, wk); Ravichandran Ashwin; Shikhar Dhawan; Ravindra Jadeja; Virat Kohli; Bhuvneshwar Kumar; Amit Mishra; Mohammed Shami; Ajinkya Rahane; Suresh Raina; Ambati Rayudu; Ishant Sharma; Mohit Sharma; Rohit Sharma; Umesh Yadav; Yuvraj Singh	Graeme Smith (c); AB de Villiers (wk); Hashim Amla; Jean-Paul Duminy; Faf du Plessis; Dean Elgar; Imran Tahir; Jacques Kallis; Rory Kleinveldt; Morne Morkel; Alviro Petersen; Robin Peterson; Vernon Philander; Dale Steyn; Thami Tsolekile	MS Dhoni (c, wk); Ravichandran Ashwin; Shikhar Dhawan; Ravindra Jadeja; Zaheer Khan; Virat Kohli; Bhuvneshwar Kumar; Mohammed Shami; Pragyan Ojha; Cheteshwar Pujara; Ajinkya Rahane; Ambati Rayudu; Wriddhiman Saha (wk); Ishant Sharma; Rohit Sharma; Murali Vijay; Umesh Yadav

== ODI series ==
=== 1st ODI ===
5 December
13:30 (D/N)
Scorecard

South Africa; 358/4 (50 overs)	v	India; 217 (41 overs)
Quinton de Kock 135 (121); Mohammed Shami 3/68 (10 overs)		MS Dhoni 65 (71); Dale Steyn 3/25 (8 overs)

South Africa won by 141 runs
New Wanderers Stadium, Johannesburg
Umpires: Adrian Holdstock (SA) and Richard Illingworth (ENG)
Player of the match: Quinton de Kock (SA)

- India won the toss and elected to field.

=== 2nd ODI ===
8 December
10:00 (D/N)
Scorecard

South Africa; 280/6 (49 overs)	v	India; 146 (35.1 overs)
Quinton de Kock 106 (118); Mohammed Shami 3/48 (8 overs)		Suresh Raina 36 (50); Lonwabo Tsotsobe 4/25 (7.1 overs)

South Africa won by 134 runs
Kingsmead, Durban
Umpires: Shaun George (SA) and Richard Illingworth (ENG)
Player of the match: Quinton de Kock (SA)

- India won the toss and elected to field.
- Wet pitch delayed the toss & reduced both teams' innings to 49 overs each

=== 3rd ODI ===
11 December
13:30 (D/N)
Scorecard

South Africa; 301/8 (50 overs)	v	India
AB de Villiers 109 (101); Ishant Sharma 4/40 (10 overs)

No result
Centurion Park, Centurion
Umpires: Johan Cloete (SA) and Richard Illingworth (Eng)

- South Africa won the toss and elected to bat.
- No further play was possible due to rain.

== Tour match ==
14–15 December

South African Invitation XI	v	Indians

Match abandoned without a ball bowled
Willowmoore Park, Benoni

== Test series ==
=== First Test ===
18–22 December
Scorecard

India	v	South Africa
280 (105 overs); Virat Kohli 119 (181); Vernon Philander 4/61 (27 overs)		244 (75.3 overs); Graeme Smith 68 (119); Ishant Sharma 4/79 (25 overs)
421 (120.4 overs); Cheteshwar Pujara 153 (270); Vernon Philander 3/68 (28 overs)		450/7 (136 overs); Faf du Plessis 134 (309); Mohammed Shami 3/107 (28 overs)

Match drawn
New Wanderers Stadium, Johannesburg
Umpires: Steve Davis (Aus) and Rod Tucker (Aus)
Player of the match: Virat Kohli (Ind)

- India won the toss and elected to bat.

The Test was India's first after the retirement of Sachin Tendulkar. After opting to bat, India posted 280 runs in the first innings. In return, South Africa made 244. India in their second innings went on to score 421 runs with Cheteshwar Pujara scoring 153 and Virat Kohli making 96, falling four runs short of becoming the first Indian no.4 to hit centuries in both innings of a test match. Their 222-run stand is the highest for India in South Africa in tests. Chasing a target of 458 runs, South Africa ended up with 450 runs for the loss of seven wickets, leading to a draw. The team's total of 450, is the second-highest fourth-innings score to draw a match and third overall. Francois du Plessis and AB de Villiers made centuries in the South Africa total. Described as one among the "closest draws", the fourth innings total of 450 made by South Africa is the second-highest by a team in a drawn match and third overall. During the match, wicket-keepers from both the teams bowled, making it the first time to happen in the history of Test cricket. Described as one of the "Closest draws", the match saw a few players from both sides achieving significant milestones in their careers – India's Zaheer Khan became the fourth Indian to capture 300 wickets in Test cricket. Vernon Philander playing in his 19th Test match, became the fastest bowler to take 100 wickets for South Africa. The Test also marked the eighth occasion where Indian spinners failed to pick up a single wicket.

=== Second Test ===
26–30 December
Scorecard

India	v	South Africa
334 (111.3 overs); Murali Vijay 97 (226); Dale Steyn 6/100 (30 overs)		500 (155.2 overs); Jacques Kallis 115 (316); Ravindra Jadeja 6/138 (58.2 overs)
223 (86 overs); Ajinkya Rahane 96 (157); Robin Peterson 4/74 (24 overs)		59/0 (11.4 overs); Alviro Petersen 31* (37)

South Africa won by 10 wickets
Kingsmead, Durban
Umpires: Steve Davis (Aus) and Rod Tucker (Aus)
Player of the match: Dale Steyn (SA)

- India won the toss and elected to bat.
- Jacques Kallis (SA) played his last Test match.

== Statistics ==
South Africa

- Vernon Philander took his 100th Test wicket when he got Shikhar Dhawan out in the 2nd innings of the 1st Test.
- Faf du Plessis made his 3rd Test century in the second innings of the 1st Test.
- AB de Villiers made his 18th Test century in the second innings of the 1st Test.
- Jacques Kallis made his 45th Test century in the first innings of the 2nd Test.

India

- Virat Kohli made his 5th Test century in the first innings of the 1st Test.
- Cheteshwar Pujara made his 6th Test century in the second innings of the 1st Test.
- Zaheer Khan took his 300th Test wicket when he got Jacques Kallis out in the 2nd innings of the 1st Test.
