= Vineet Kulkarni =

Indian cricket umpire (born 1979)

Personal information
- Full name: Vineet Anil Kulkarni
- Born: 6 October 1979 (age 47); Pune, Maharashtra, India
- Role: Umpire

Umpiring information
- ODIs umpired: 25 (2013–2016)
- T20Is umpired: 14 (2012–2016)
- WODIs umpired: 7 (2013)
- WT20Is umpired: 3 (2016)
- Source: ESPNcricinfo, 15 February 2016

Vineet Anil Kulkarni (born 6 October 1979) is an Indian cricket umpire. Kulkarni made his debut as an umpire in both List A and first-class cricket in 2009. He served on the ICC International Panel of Umpires in the on-field category and officiated in 25 One Day Internationals (ODIs) and 14 Twenty20 Internationals (T20Is). He made his T20I umpiring debut in 2012 and his ODI umpiring debut a year later.

== Career ==
In September 2023, he served as an examiner of cricket umpiring examination organised by Dhule district cricket association. At Dhule, aspirants from Jalgaon, Nandurbar district participated.

== See also ==
- List of One Day International cricket umpires
- List of Twenty20 International cricket umpires
