= Vinay Kumar =

Indian cricketer

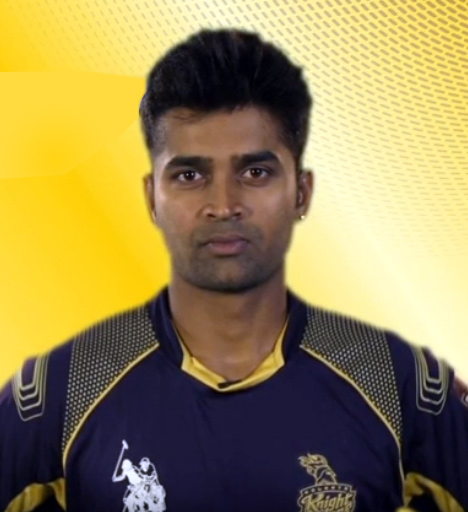
- Kumar in 2014

Personal information
- Full name: Vinay Kumar Ranganath
- Born: 12 February 1984 (age 42); Davanagere, Karnataka, India
- Batting: Right-handed
- Bowling: Right-arm medium-fast
- Role: Bowler

International information
- National side: India (2010–2013)
- Only Test (cap 274): 13 January 2012 v Australia
- ODI debut (cap 183): 28 May 2010 v Zimbabwe
- Last ODI: 2 November 2013 v Australia
- T20I debut (cap 29): 11 May 2010 v Sri Lanka
- Last T20I: 10 October 2013 v Australia

Domestic team information
- Years: Team
- 2004–2019: Karnataka
- 2008–2010, 2012–2013: Royal Challengers Bangalore (squad no. 5)
- 2011: Kochi Tuskers Kerala
- 2014, 2018: Kolkata Knight Riders
- 2015–2017: Mumbai Indians
- 2019–2021: Puducherry

Career statistics
Competition	Test	ODI	T20I	FC
Matches	1	31	9	139
Runs scored	11	86	2	3,311
Batting average	5.50	9.55	–	22.07
100s/50s	0/0	0/0	0/0	2/17
Top score	6	27*	2*	105*
Balls bowled	78	1,436	189	23,931
Wickets	1	48	10	504
Bowling average	73.00	30.44	24.70	22.44
5 wickets in innings	0	0	0	26
10 wickets in match	0	0	0	5
Best bowling	1/73	4/30	3/24	8/32
Catches/stumpings	0/–	6/–	1/–	72/–
Medal record
Men's Cricket
Representing India
ICC Champions Trophy
Winner	2013 England and Wales
- Source: ESPNcricinfo, 26 February 2021

Vinay Kumar (born 12 February 1984) is an Indian former cricketer and cricket commentator who has represented India at Test, One Day International (ODI) and Twenty20 levels. He is a right-arm medium fast bowler who played domestic cricket for Karnataka and also in the Indian Premier League for Royal Challengers Bangalore, Mumbai Indians and Kolkata Knight Riders. He captained Karnataka to two consecutive Ranji Trophy titles in 2013–14 and 2014–15 seasons. In November 2018, he played in his 100th match in the Ranji Trophy. In August 2019, he moved from Karnataka to Puducherry, ahead of the 2019–20 Ranji Trophy season. During the first round of matches in the tournament, he took his 400th wicket in the Ranji Trophy. In February 2021, Kumar announced his retirement from all forms of the game. With India, he was a member of the team that won the 2013 ICC Champions Trophy.

== Personal life ==
Vinay Kumar was born in Davangere, Karnataka, on 12 February 1984. He attended a government school in Davangere before graduating from the A.R.G. Arts and Commerce College with a Bachelor of Commerce degree. Vinay Kumar married Richa Singh on 29 November 2013. Vinay Kumar and Richa Singh had a baby girl on 23 June 2022.

== Early career (2004–2010) ==
Vinay Kumar was selected for Karnataka's Ranji Trophy team in the 2004–05 season and made his debut against Bengal. He was the Ranji Trophy's second-highest wicket-taker in the 2007–08 season, with 40 at an average of 18.52. He was signed by the Royal Challengers Bangalore for the inaugural Indian Premier League (IPL) in 2008. He is affectionately called "The Davangere Express". He is often regarded as the fastest off-spinner in the world to open the bowling for any team.

He was the highest wicket taker in the 2009–2010 domestic season. In IPL 2010, he took 16 wickets, the highest among all pace bowlers in the tournament, leading to his selection to play for India in the 2010 ICC World Twenty20 in the West Indies. He played in one match in the tournament, taking two wickets for 30 runs from four overs in India's five-wicket defeat to Sri Lanka.

== International career (2010–2021) ==
In May 2010, after India's elimination from the ICC World Twenty20, Vinay Kumar made his ODI debut against Zimbabwe in Harare, taking 2/51 off eight overs in a six-wicket defeat. He injured his knee before India's next fixture, and was replaced in their squad by Abhimanyu Mithun. Vinay Kumar returned to the Indian team in October 2010, playing in one ODI of India's three-match series against Australia and taking 0/71 off nine overs.

In 2011, Vinay Kumar joined Kochi Tuskers Kerala for the franchise's first and only season in the IPL, having been bought for US$475,000 in the pre-season auction. He also returned to the Indian team, being selected in the limited overs squads for tours of the West Indies and England. He played in the dead rubber fifth match of the ODI series against the West Indies, taking one for 46 from nine overs. He then played in three ODIs in England, taking two wickets. Later in 2011 he played in four ODIs in India against each of England and the West Indies. In December, at the age of 27, he was called into India's Test squad for the first time as a replacement for the injured Varun Aaron for the 2011–12 tour of Australia. He made his Test debut in the third of the four-match series in Perth. His opportunity came as India chose to take four pace bowlers into the match, which caused him to be selected ahead of spinner R Ashwin. He took one wicket (that of Michael Hussey) for 73 runs in Australia's first and only innings of the match. He was left out of India's team for the fourth and final Test of the series in Adelaide, Ashwin returning to the team in his place. He also played in the T20 match between Australia and India on 3 February 2012. In IPL 2014, he played for Kolkata Knight Riders who traded him to Mumbai Indians before the 2015 season. In the 2018 IPL Auction, he was sold to the Kolkata Knight Riders for 1 crore.

== Playing style ==
Cricketing website ESPNcricinfo compares Vinay Kumar's style of bowling to that of Venkatesh Prasad, saying that he relies "more on outswingers, legcutters and accuracy, than on outright pace". His lack of pace in his Test debut against Australia in January 2012—bowling at 120 kilometres per hour in his opening spell—was criticised by former Pakistan fast bowler Wasim Akram as "disappointing". On the other hand, The Indian Express noted about Vinay Kumar's performances in his breakthrough 2010 IPL season: "He doesn’t bowl too fast nor too slow, and he doesn’t have threatening in-swingers or the deliveries that shape away from right-handers. But if there is one art that Vinay Kumar has mastered, it is the all-important one of picking up wickets." In the IPL 2018, Vinay got heavily trolled in social media after he told the trollers to "Chill".
