= 2025–2027 World Test Championship =

Fourth edition of World Test Championship

2025–2027 ICC World Test Championship
- Dates: 17 June 2025 – 12 June 2027
- Administrator: International Cricket Council
- Cricket format: Test cricket
- Tournament format(s): League and Final
- Participants: 9
- Matches: 71
- Official website: ICC World Test Championship

1st Test between New Zealand and India in November 2026

The 2025–2027 ICC World Test Championship is the fourth edition of the ICC World Test Championship. It is being played in Test format. It started on 17 June 2025 with the contest between Sri Lanka and Bangladesh at Galle International Stadium, and is scheduled to finish on 12 June 2027 with the final match to be played at The Oval.

== Format ==
The tournament consists of 27 series and 71 matches in the league stage. The top two teams in the points table advance to the final. Each team plays six series, three at home and three away, with each series containing two to five Test matches.

The points system is unchanged from the previous edition. A win is worth all 12 points, a tie is worth 6 points each, a draw is worth 4 points each, and a loss is worth 0 points. A team that is behind the required over rate at the end of a match would have one point deducted for each over it was behind (over rate deduction doesn't applied when the team all out the opponent within 80 overs) . As in the previous edition, teams are ranked in the league table based on the percentage of total points won out of total points contested.

In the event that this percentage is tied between teams, a series of tiebreaker criteria are used to determine the standings of teams, starting with the number of series wins, followed by each team's percentage in away matches, and finally the ICC Test Rankings at the end of the league stage.

Points system
Match result	Points earned	Points contested	Percentage of points won
Win	12	12	100
Tie	6	12	50
Draw	4	12	33.33
Loss	0	12	0

Points available per series
Matches in series	Total points available
2	24
3	36
4	48
5	60

== Participants ==
Despite Afghanistan, Ireland, and Zimbabwe all holding full ICC member status, they are not participants of the World Test Championship (WTC).

The remaining nine full ICC members taking part in the 2025–2027 World Test Championship are:

- Australia
- Bangladesh
- England
- India
- New Zealand
- Pakistan
- South Africa
- Sri Lanka
- West Indies

== Schedule ==
The International Cricket Council (ICC) announced the 2023–2027 Future Tours Programme on 17 August 2022 and identified which series was a part of the World Test Championship. Rather than being a full round-robin tournament in which everyone plays everyone else equally, each team plays only six of the other eight as in the previous cycles. The exact dates and the venues of these series will be decided by the boards of the competing teams.

Home \ Away	AUS	BAN	ENG	IND	NZ	PAK	SA	SL	WI
Australia	—	1–1 [2]	4–1 [5]	—	4 matches	—	—	—	—
Bangladesh	—	—	2 matches	—	—	2–0 [2]	—	—	0–1 [2]
England	—	—	—	2–2 [5]	1–2 [3]	3–0 [3]	—	—	—
India	5 matches	—	—	—	—	—	0–2 [2]	—	2–0 [2]
New Zealand	—	—	—	2 matches	—	—	—	2 matches	2–0 [3]
Pakistan	—	—	—	—	2 matches	—	1–1 [2]	1–0 [2]	—
South Africa	2–1 [3]	1–0 [2]*	3 matches	—	—	—	—	—	—
Sri Lanka	—	1–0 [2]	—	0–1 [2]	—	—	2 matches	—	—
West Indies	0–3 [3]	—	—	—	—	1–1 [2]	—	1–0 [2]	—

Updated to match(es) played on 20 November 2026 (Pakistan v Sri Lanka). Source: ICC Men's FTP. The numbers in square brackets are the number of matches in the series.
Legend: Blue = home team win; Yellow = draw; Red = away team win.

Team	Scheduled matches			Not scheduled to play against
Team	Total	Home	Away	Not scheduled to play against
Australia	22	England (5); New Zealand (4); Bangladesh (2)	West Indies (3); South Africa (3); India (5)	Pakistan Sri Lanka
Bangladesh	12	Pakistan (2); West Indies (2); England (2)	Sri Lanka (2); South Africa (2); Australia (2)	India New Zealand
England	21	India (5); New Zealand (3); Pakistan (3)	Australia (5); South Africa (3); Bangladesh (2)	Sri Lanka West Indies
India	18	West Indies (2); South Africa (2); Australia (5)	England (5); Sri Lanka (2); New Zealand (2)	Bangladesh Pakistan
New Zealand	16	West Indies (3); India (2); Sri Lanka (2)	England (3); Australia (4); Pakistan (2)	Bangladesh South Africa
Pakistan	13	South Africa (2); Sri Lanka (2); New Zealand (2)	Bangladesh (2); West Indies (2); England (3)	Australia India
South Africa	14	Australia (3); Bangladesh (2); England (3)	Pakistan (2); India (2); Sri Lanka (2)	New Zealand West Indies
Sri Lanka	12	Bangladesh (2); India (2); South Africa (2)	West Indies (2); Pakistan (2); New Zealand (2)	Australia England
West Indies	14	Australia (3); Sri Lanka (2); Pakistan (2)	India (2); New Zealand (3); Bangladesh (2)	England South Africa

=== Test series statistics ===
Pos.	Team	Test Series			
Pos.	Team	Series	Win	Lost	Drawn
1	Australia	4	2	1	1
2	Bangladesh	4	1	2	1
3	England	4	1	2	1
4	India	4	2	1	1
5	New Zealand	2	2	0	0
6	Pakistan	5	1	2	2
7	South Africa	3	2	0	1
8	Sri Lanka	4	1	3	0
9	West Indies	6	2	3	1

== League table ==
Pos	Team	Pld	W	L	D	T	Ded	Con	Pts	Pct	Qualification
1	South Africa	8	6	2	0	0	0	96	72	75.00	2027 World Test Championship final
2	New Zealand	6	4	1	1	0	0	72	52	72.22	2027 World Test Championship final
3	Australia	13	9	4	0	0	0	156	108	69.23	
4	India	11	5	4	2	0	0	132	68	51.52	
5	Bangladesh	9	3	4	2	0	0	108	44	40.74	
6	England	16	7	8	1	0	14	192	74	38.54 (Note: England were deducted a total of 14 points for a slow over-rate in the third Test against India (2 points) and the second Test against New Zealand (12 points).)	
7	West Indies (E)	14	3	8	3	0	2	168	46	27.38 (Note: West Indies were deducted 2 points for maintaining a slow over-rate in the second Test against Sri Lanka.)	
8	Sri Lanka	8	1	3	4	0	15	96	13	13.54 (Note: Sri Lanka were deducted 15 points for maintaining a slow over-rate in the first Test against Pakistan.)	
9	Pakistan (E)	11	3	7	1	0	24	132	16	12.12 (Note: Pakistan were deducted a total of 24 points for a slow over-rate in the first Test against Bangladesh (8 points), the third Test against England (11 points) and the first Test against Sri Lanka (5 points).)	

Updated to match(es) played on 20 November 2026. Source: International Cricket Council, ESPNcricinfo
Notes:

Tie-breaking criteria
The ranking of teams in the league stage is determined as follows:
1. Points Percentage in all matches;
2. Number of Series wins;
3. Points Percentage in away matches;
4. ICC Test Rankings on 30 April 2027

== League stage ==
=== 2025 ===
==== Sri Lanka v Bangladesh ====
17–21 June 2025
Scorecard

Bangladesh; 495 (153.4 overs) & 285/6d (87 overs)	v	Sri Lanka; 485 (131.2 overs) & 72/4 (32 overs)

Match drawn
Galle International Stadium, Galle
Points: Sri Lanka 4, Bangladesh 4

25–29 June 2025
Scorecard

Bangladesh; 247 (79.3 overs) & 133 (44.2 overs)	v	Sri Lanka; 458 (116.5 overs)

Sri Lanka won by an innings and 78 runs
Sinhalese Sports Club Cricket Ground, Colombo
Points: Sri Lanka 12, Bangladesh 0

==== Anderson–Tendulkar Trophy (England v India) ====
20–24 June 2025
Scorecard

India; 471 (113 overs) & 364 (96 overs)	v	England; 465 (100.4 overs) & 373/5 (82 overs)

England won by 5 wickets
Headingley, Leeds
Points: England 12, India 0

2–6 July 2025
Scorecard

India; 587 (151 overs) & 427/6d (83 overs)	v	England; 407 (89.3 overs) & 271 (68.1 overs)

India won by 336 runs
Edgbaston, Birmingham
Points: India 12, England 0

10–14 July 2025
Scorecard

England; 387 (112.3 overs) & 192 (62.1 overs)	v	India; 387 (119.2 overs) & 170 (74.5 overs)

England won by 22 runs
Lord's, London
Points: England 10, India 0

23–27 July 2025
Scorecard

India; 358 (114.1 overs) & 425/4 (143 overs)	v	England; 669 (157.1 overs)

Match drawn
Old Trafford, Manchester
Points: England 4, India 4

31 July–4 August 2025
Scorecard

India; 224 (69.4 overs) & 396 (88 overs)	v	England; 247 (51.2 overs) & 367 (85.1 overs)

India won by 6 runs
The Oval, London
Points: India 12, England 0

==== Frank Worrell Trophy (West Indies v Australia) ====
25–29 June 2025
Scorecard

Australia; 180 (56.5 overs) & 310 (81.5 overs)	v	West Indies; 190 (63.2 overs) & 141 (33.4 overs)

Australia won by 159 runs
Kensington Oval, Bridgetown
Points: Australia 12, West Indies 0

3–6 July 2025
Scorecard

Australia; 286 (66.5 overs) & 243 (71.3 overs)	v	West Indies; 253 (73.2 overs) & 143 (34.3 overs)

Australia won by 133 runs
Grenada National Cricket Stadium, St. George's
Points: Australia 12, West Indies 0

12–14 July 2025 (D/N)
Scorecard

Australia; 225 (70.3 overs) & 121 (37 overs)	v	West Indies; 143 (52.1 overs) & 27 (14.3 overs)

Australia won by 176 runs
Sabina Park, Kingston
Points: Australia 12, West Indies 0

=== 2025–26 ===
==== India v West Indies ====
2–6 October 2025
Scorecard

West Indies; 162 (44.1 overs) & 146 (45.1 overs)	v	India; 448/5d (128 overs)

India won by an innings and 140 runs
Narendra Modi Stadium, Ahmedabad
Points: India 12, West Indies 0

10–14 October 2025
Scorecard

India; 518/5d (134.2 overs) & 124/3 (35.2 overs)	v	West Indies; 248 (81.5 overs) & 390 (118.5 overs) (f/o)

India won by 7 wickets
Arun Jaitley Cricket Stadium, New Delhi
Points: India 12, West Indies 0

==== Pakistan v South Africa ====
12–16 October 2025
Scorecard

Pakistan; 378 (110.4 overs) & 167 (46.1 overs)	v	South Africa; 269 (84 overs) & 183 (60.5 overs)

Pakistan won by 93 runs
Gaddafi Stadium, Lahore
Points: Pakistan 12, South Africa 0

20–24 October 2025
Scorecard

Pakistan; 333 (113.4 overs) & 138 (49.3 overs)	v	South Africa; 404 (119.3 overs) & 73/2 (12.3 overs)

South Africa won by 8 wickets
Rawalpindi Cricket Stadium, Rawalpindi
Points: South Africa 12, Pakistan 0

==== Freedom Trophy (India v South Africa) ====
14–16 November 2025
Scorecard

South Africa; 159 (55 overs) & 153 (54 overs)	v	India; 189 (62.2 overs) & 93 (35 overs)

South Africa won by 30 runs
Eden Gardens, Kolkata
Points: South Africa 12, India 0

22–26 November 2025
Scorecard

South Africa; 489 (151.1 overs) & 260/5d (78.3 overs)	v	India; 201 (83.5 overs) & 140 (63.5 overs)

South Africa won by 408 runs
Assam Cricket Association Stadium, Guwahati
Points: South Africa 12, India 0

==== The Ashes (Australia v England) ====
21–22 November 2025
Scorecard

England; 172 (32.5 overs) & 164 (34.4 overs)	v	Australia; 132 (45.2 overs) & 2/205 (28.2 overs)

Australia won by 8 wickets
Perth Stadium, Perth
Points: Australia 12, England 0

4–7 December 2025 (D/N)
Scorecard

England; 334 (76.2 overs) & 241 (75.2 overs)	v	Australia; 511 (117.3 overs) & 2/69 (10 overs)

Australia won by 8 wickets
The Gabba, Brisbane
Points: Australia 12, England 0

17–21 December 2025
Scorecard

Australia; 371 (91.2 overs) & 349 (84.4 overs)	v	England; 286 (87.2 overs) & 352 (102.5 overs)

Australia won by 82 runs
Adelaide Oval, Adelaide
Points: Australia 12, England 0

26–27 December 2025
Scorecard

Australia; 152 (45.2 overs) & 132 (34.3 overs)	v	England; 110 (29.5 overs) & 6/178 (32.2 overs)

England won by 4 wickets
Melbourne Cricket Ground, Melbourne
Points: England 12, Australia 0

4–8 January 2026
Scorecard

England; 384 (97.3 overs) & 342 (88.2 overs)	v	Australia; 567 (133.5 overs) & 5/161 (31.2 overs)

Australia won by 5 wickets
Sydney Cricket Ground, Sydney
Points: Australia 12, England 0

==== New Zealand v West Indies ====
2–6 December 2025
Scorecard

New Zealand; 231 (70.3 overs) & 466/8d (109 overs)	v	West Indies; 167 (75.4 overs) & 457/6 (163.3 overs)

Match drawn
Hagley Oval, Christchurch
Points: New Zealand 4, West Indies 4

10–12 December 2025
Scorecard

West Indies; 205 (75 overs) & 128 (46.2 overs)	v	New Zealand; 278/9d (74.4 overs) & 57/1 (10 overs)

New Zealand won by 9 wickets
Basin Reserve, Wellington
Points: New Zealand 12, West Indies 0

18–22 December 2025
Scorecard

New Zealand; 575/8d (155 overs) & 306/2d (54 overs)	v	West Indies; 420 (128.2 overs) & 138 (80.3 overs)

New Zealand won by 323 runs
Bay Oval, Mount Maunganui
Points: New Zealand 12, West Indies 0

=== 2026 ===
==== Bangladesh v Pakistan ====
8–12 May 2026
Scorecard

Bangladesh; 413 (117.1 overs) & 240/9d (70.3 overs)	v	Pakistan; 386 (100.3 overs) & 163 (52.5 overs)

Bangladesh won by 104 runs
Sher-e-Bangla National Cricket Stadium, Dhaka
Points: Bangladesh 12, Pakistan −8

16–20 May 2026
Scorecard

Bangladesh; 278 (77 overs) & 390 (102.2 overs)	v	Pakistan; 232 (57.4 overs) & 358 (97.2 overs)

Bangladesh won by 78 runs
Sylhet International Cricket Stadium, Sylhet
Points: Bangladesh 12, Pakistan 0

==== Crowe–Thorpe Trophy (England v New Zealand) ====
4–7 June 2026
Scorecard

England; 140 (39.4 overs) & 226 (56 overs)	v	New Zealand; 113 (29.5 overs) & 138 (40.3 overs)

England won by 115 runs
Lord's, London
Points: England 12, New Zealand 0

17–21 June 2026
Scorecard

New Zealand; 391 (96.2 overs) & 362 (87.1 overs)	v	England; 291 (84 overs) & 209 (58.1 overs)

New Zealand won by 253 runs
The Oval, London
Points: New Zealand 12, England –12

25–29 June 2026
Scorecard

New Zealand; 438 (114.5 overs) & 288/9d (94 overs)	v	England; 354 (88.2 overs) & 212 (51.2 overs)

New Zealand won by 160 runs
Trent Bridge, Nottingham
Points: New Zealand 12, England 0

==== Sobers–Tissera Trophy (West Indies v Sri Lanka) ====
25–29 June 2026
Scorecard

Sri Lanka; 308 (71.5 overs) & 101 (31.2 overs)	v	West Indies; 626/9d (160.5 overs)

West Indies won by an innings and 217 runs
Sir Vivian Richards Stadium, North Sound
Points: West Indies 12, Sri Lanka 0

3–7 July 2026
Scorecard

Sri Lanka; 549/9d (139.3 overs) & 251/9d (49 overs)	v	West Indies; 499 (165.5 overs) & 109/0 (40 overs)

Match drawn
Sir Vivian Richards Stadium, North Sound
Points: Sri Lanka 4, West Indies 2

==== West Indies v Pakistan ====
25–28 July 2026
Scorecard

West Indies; 311 (98.5 overs) & 181 (54.5 overs)	v	Pakistan; 282 (80.1 overs) & 120 (40.2 overs)

West Indies won by 90 runs
Brian Lara Cricket Academy, San Fernando
Points: West Indies 12, Pakistan 0

2–6 August 2026
Scorecard

West Indies; 344 (105.4 overs) & 117 (46.1 overs)	v	Pakistan; 387 (115 overs) & 77/2 (23.3 overs)

Pakistan won by 8 wickets
Queen's Park Oval, Port of Spain
Points: Pakistan 12, West Indies 0

==== Australia v Bangladesh ====
13–16 August 2026
Scorecard

Australia; 198 (53 overs) & 284 (95.1 overs)	v	Bangladesh; 426 (138 overs) & 1/57 (14.2 overs)

Bangladesh won by 9 wickets
Marrara Oval, Darwin
Points: Bangladesh 12, Australia 0

22–23 August 2026
Scorecard

Bangladesh; 64 (34 overs) & 95 (38.3 overs)	v	Australia; 210 (52.3 overs)

Australia won by an innings and 51 runs
Great Barrier Reef Arena, Mackay
Points: Australia 12, Bangladesh 0

==== Sri Lanka v India ====
15–19 August 2026
Scorecard

India; 462 (116.4 overs) & 193 (48.5 overs)	v	Sri Lanka; 284 (79.4 overs) & 206 (77.4 overs)

India won by 165 runs
Galle International Stadium, Galle
Points: India 12, Sri Lanka 0

23–27 August 2026
Scorecard

India; 503/9d (138 overs)	v	Sri Lanka; 290 (89.4 overs) & 429/9d (154 overs) (f/o)

Match drawn
Sinhalese Sports Club Cricket Ground, Colombo
Points: India 4, Sri Lanka 4

==== England v Pakistan ====
19–21 August 2026
Scorecard

Pakistan; 171 (48.1 overs) & 135 (37.3 overs)	v	England; 409 (89.5 overs)

England won by an innings and 103 runs
Headingley, Leeds
Points: England 12, Pakistan 0

27–30 August 2026
Scorecard

England; 290 (66.4 overs) & 208 (54.2 overs)	v	Pakistan; 110 (37.2 overs) & 194 (50.5 overs)

England won by 194 runs
Lord's, London
Points: England 12, Pakistan 0

9–12 September 2026
Scorecard

Pakistan; 133 (33.5 overs) & 449 (96.4 overs)	v	England; 453 (89 overs) & 130/2 (24.2 overs)

England won by 8 wickets
Edgbaston, Birmingham
Points: England 12, Pakistan –11

=== 2026–27 ===
==== South Africa v Australia ====
9–13 October 2026
Scorecard

Australia; 390 (137.2 overs) & 314/6d (58 overs)	v	South Africa; 284 (78 overs) & 206 (86.5 overs)

Australia won by 214 runs
Kingsmead, Durban
Points: Australia 12, South Africa 0

18–22 October 2026
Scorecard

South Africa; 425/9d (127.1 overs)	v	Australia; 99 (42.3 overs) & 295 (107.1 overs) (f/o)

South Africa won by an innings and 31 runs
St George's Park, Gqeberha
Points: South Africa 12, Australia 0

27–31 October 2026
Scorecard

South Africa; 329 (82.3 overs) & 387 (134.4 overs)	v	Australia; 429 (125.1 overs) & 111 (57.1 overs)

South Africa won by 176 runs
Newlands, Cape Town
Points: South Africa 12, Australia 0

==== Bangladesh v West Indies ====
28–31 October 2026
Scorecard

Bangladesh; 272 (97.4 overs) & 142 (38.4 overs)	v	West Indies; 245 (82.5 overs) & 170/2 (35.1 overs)

West Indies won by 8 wickets
Sher-e-Bangla National Cricket Stadium, Dhaka
Points: West Indies 12, Bangladesh 0

5–9 November 2026
Scorecard

West Indies; 356 (106.4 overs) & 398/6d (93 overs)	v	Bangladesh; 386 (111.5 overs) & 184/4 (59 overs)

Match drawn
Sylhet International Cricket Stadium, Sylhet
Points: Bangladesh 4, West Indies 4

==== Pakistan v Sri Lanka ====
9–13 November 2026
Scorecard

Pakistan; 434/9d (106.3 overs) & 284/8 (84.5 overs)	v	Sri Lanka; 446 (117.2 overs)

Match drawn
Rawalpindi Cricket Stadium, Rawalpindi
Points: Pakistan –1, Sri Lanka –11

17–21 November 2026
Scorecard

Sri Lanka; 98 (35.3 overs) & 316 (95 overs)	v	Pakistan; 325 (87.5 overs) & 90/2 (13 overs)

Pakistan won by 8 wickets
Rawalpindi Cricket Stadium, Rawalpindi
Points: Pakistan 12, Sri Lanka 0

==== South Africa v Bangladesh ====
15–19 November 2026
Scorecard

Bangladesh; 400 (101.2 overs) & 168 (55.3 overs)	v	South Africa; 557 (124.1 overs) & 12/1 (1.3 overs)

South Africa won by 9 wickets
Wanderers Stadium, Johannesburg
Points: South Africa 12, Bangladesh 0

23–27 November 2026
Scorecard

South Africa	v	Bangladesh

Centurion Park, Centurion

==== New Zealand v India ====
19–23 November 2026
Scorecard

New Zealand; 368 (121 overs) & 119/2 (45 overs)	v	India; 720/9d (166 overs)

Stumps, Day 4
Basin Reserve, Wellington

27 November–1 December 2026
Scorecard

New Zealand	v	India

Hagley Oval, Christchurch

==== Trans-Tasman Trophy (Australia v New Zealand) ====
9–13 December 2026
Scorecard

Australia	v	New Zealand

Perth Stadium, Perth

17–21 December 2026
Scorecard

Australia	v	New Zealand

Adelaide Oval, Adelaide

26–30 December 2026
Scorecard

Australia	v	New Zealand

Melbourne Cricket Ground, Melbourne

4–8 January 2027
Scorecard

Australia	v	New Zealand

Sydney Cricket Ground, Sydney

==== Basil D'Oliveira Trophy (South Africa v England) ====
17–21 December 2026
Scorecard

South Africa	v	England

Wanderers Stadium, Johannesburg

26–30 December 2026
Scorecard

South Africa	v	England

Centurion Park, Centurion

3–7 January 2027
Scorecard

South Africa	v	England

Newlands, Cape Town

==== Border–Gavaskar Trophy (India v Australia) ====
21–25 January 2027
Scorecard

India	v	Australia

Vidarbha Cricket Association Stadium, Nagpur

29 January–2 February 2027
Scorecard

India	v	Australia

M. A. Chidambaram Stadium, Chennai

11–15 February 2027
Scorecard

India	v	Australia

Assam Cricket Association Stadium, Guwahati

19–23 February 2027
Scorecard

India	v	Australia

JSCA International Stadium Complex, Ranchi

27 February–3 March 2027
Scorecard

India	v	Australia

Narendra Modi Stadium, Ahmedabad

==== New Zealand v Sri Lanka ====
4–8 February 2027

New Zealand	v	Sri Lanka

Bay Oval, Mount Maunganui

12–16 February 2027

New Zealand	v	Sri Lanka

Seddon Park, Hamilton

==== Bangladesh v England ====
February 2027

Bangladesh	v	England

Sher-e-Bangla National Cricket Stadium, Dhaka

February 2027

Bangladesh	v	England

Zahur Ahmed Chowdhury Stadium, Chattogram

==== Sri Lanka v South Africa ====
February 2027

Sri Lanka	v	South Africa

March 2027

Sri Lanka	v	South Africa

==== Pakistan v New Zealand ====
March 2027

Pakistan	v	New Zealand

March 2027

Pakistan	v	New Zealand

== Final match ==
8–12 June 2027

TBD	v	TBD

The Oval, London

== Statistics ==
=== Individual statistics ===
==== Most Runs ====
Runs	Batter	Mat	Inns	NO	Avg	HS	100s	50s
1,272	(England) Joe Root	16	30	3	47.11	160	5	4
1,271	(England) Harry Brook	16	29	1	45.39	158	2	9
1,124	(Australia) Travis Head	13	25	0	44.96	170	4	2
1,024	(India) Shubman Gill	10	17	2	68.26	269	5	2
954	(England) Ben Duckett	16	30	0	31.80	149	2	3
Source: ESPNcricinfo | Last updated: 31 October 2026

==== Highest Individual Score ====
Runs	Batter	Balls	4s	6s	Opposition	Venue	Match date
269	(India) Shubman Gill	387	30	3	England	Edgbaston Cricket Ground, Birmingham	2 July 2025
242*	(Bangladesh) Tawhid Hridoy	359	22	11	West Indies	Sylhet International Cricket Stadium, Sylhet	7 November 2026
233	(Cricket West Indies) Amir Jangoo	373	19	3	Sri Lanka	Sir Vivian Richards Stadium, Antigua	25 June 2026
227	(New Zealand) Devon Conway	367	31	0	West Indies	Bay Oval, Mount Maunganui	18 December 2025
202*	(Cricket West Indies) Justin Greaves	388	19	0	New Zealand	Hagley Oval, Christchurch	2 December 2025
Source: ESPNcricinfo | Last updated: 7 November 2026

==== Most hundreds ====
100s	Batter	Mat	Inns	Runs	HS	Avg
5	(India) Shubman Gill	10	17	1,024	269	68.26
5	(England) Joe Root	16	30	1,272	160	47.11
4	(New Zealand) Tom Latham	6	12	616	151	51.33
4	(Australia) Travis Head	13	25	1,124	170	44.96
4	(India) KL Rahul	12	21	1067	137	53.35
3	(Sri Lanka) Sonal Dinusha	7	12	701	133*	70.10
3	(New Zealand) Devon Conway	6	12	676	227	61.45
3	(Bangladesh) Najmul Hossain Shanto	9	17	731	148	45.68
3	(India) Yashasvi Jaiswal	11	20	790	175	39.50
3	(Cricket West Indies) Shai Hope	11	21	792	140	37.71
3	Source: ESPNcricinfo | Last updated: 20 November 2026					

==== Most Wickets ====
Wickets	Bowler	Mat	Inns	Runs	Overs	BBI	Ave	5WI
73	(Australia) Mitchell Starc	13	25	1,307	366.2	7/58	17.90	5
64	(England) Josh Tongue	12	24	1,623	385.2	5/45	25.35	3
50	(South Africa) Simon Harmer	8	16	974	356.0	6/16	19.48	4
43	(India) Mohammed Siraj	11	21	1,153	327.3	6/70	26.81	2
41	(England) Jofra Archer	10	20	1,073	320.0	5/53	26.17	1
Source: ESPNcricinfo | Last updated: 19 November 2026

==== Most dismissals for a wicket-keeper ====
Dismissals	Player	Mat	Inns	Ct	St	Max dis	Dis/Inn
55	(Australia) Alex Carey	13	25	53	2	5 (5ct & 0st)	2.200
46	(England) Jamie Smith	15	30	45	1	4 (4ct & 0st)	1.533
32	(Bangladesh) Litton Das	9	16	27	5	8 (6ct & 2st)	2.000
29	(Sri Lanka) Kusal Mendis	6	11	26	3	5 (5ct & 0st)	2.636
25	(Pakistan) Mohammad Rizwan	8	15	24	1	3 (3ct & 0st)	1.666
Source: ESPNcricinfo | Last updated: 20 November 2026

==== Most catches for a player ====
Catches	Player	Mat	Inns	Max dis	Dis/Inn
35	(England) Harry Brook	16	32	4	1.093
24	(South Africa) Aiden Markram	8	16	5	1.500
24	(Australia) Steve Smith	10	19	4	1.263
20	(Pakistan) Salman Ali Agha	9	16	4	1.250
16	(Cricket West Indies) Justin Greaves	14	27	2	0.592
Source: ESPNcricinfo | Last updated: 20 November 2026

==== Best bowling figures in an innings ====
Figures	Bowler	Overs	Maidens	Econ	Opposition	Venue	Match date
7/48	(Bangladesh) Shoriful Islam	15.0	3	3.20	Australia	Great Barrier Reef Arena, Mackay	22 August 2026
7/58	(Australia) Mitchell Starc	12.5	4	4.51	England	Perth Stadium, Perth	21 November 2025
7/102	(South Africa) Keshav Maharaj	42.4	5	2.39	Pakistan	Rawalpindi Stadium, Rawalpindi	20 October 2025
7/130	(Pakistan) Saqib Khan	34.0	5	3.82	Sri Lanka	Rawalpindi Stadium, Rawalpindi	9 November 2026
6/9	(Australia) Mitchell Starc	7.3	4	1.20	West Indies	Sabina Park, Kingston	12 July 2025
Source: ESPNcricinfo | Last updated: 13 November 2026

==== Best bowling figures in a match ====
Figures	Bowler	Overs	Maidens	Opposition	Venue	Match date
11/109	(New Zealand) Matt Henry	42.1	9	England	The Oval, London	17 June 2026
11/174	(South Africa) Senuran Muthusamy	49.0	7	Pakistan	Gaddafi Stadium, Lahore	12 October 2025
10/51	(Australia) Mitchell Starc	20.0	9	Bangladesh	Great Barrier Reef Arena, Mackay	22 August 2026
10/113	(Australia) Mitchell Starc	24.5	5	England	Perth Stadium, Perth	21 November 2025
10/120	(South Africa) Simon Harmer	58.1	20	Australia	Newlands Cricket Ground, Cape Town	27 October 2026
Source: ESPNcricinfo | Last updated: 1 November 2026

==== Best batting averages ====
Average	Batter	Mat	Inns	Runs	HS	NO	100s	50s
70.10	(Sri Lanka) Sonal Dinusha	6	10	626	133*	2	3	2
68.26	(India) Shubman Gill	10	17	1,024	269	2	5	2
61.45	(New Zealand) Devon Conway	6	12	676	227	1	3	1
60.76	(India) Ravindra Jadeja	11	18	790	107*	5	2	6
57.77	(New Zealand) Rachin Ravindra	6	11	520	176	2	1	3
Source: ESPNcricinfo | Qualification: Minimum 10 innings | Last updated: 20 November 2026

==== Best bowling averages ====
Average	Bowler	Mat	Wkts	Runs	Balls	BBI	BBM
9.32	(England) Ollie Robinson	4	28	261	683	5/39	8/35
14.50	(New Zealand) Matt Henry	3	16	232	541	6/29	11/109
15.43	(New Zealand) Jacob Duffy	3	23	355	927	5/34	9/128
17.90	(Australia) Mitchell Starc	13	73	1,307	2,198	7/58	10/51
18.84	(Australia) Josh Hazlewood	8	32	603	1,193	6/49	8/103
Source: ESPNcricinfo | Qualification: Minimum 500 deliveries bowled | Last updated: 19 November 2026

=== Team statistics ===
==== Highest team totals ====
Score	Team	Overs	RR	Result	Inns	Opposition	Venue	Date
720/9d	India	166	4.33	TBD	2	New Zealand	Basin Reserve, Wellington	19 November 2026
669	England	157.1	4.25	Drawn	2	India	Old Trafford Cricket Ground, Manchester	23 July 2025
626/9d	West Indies	160.5	3.89	Won	2	Sri Lanka	Sir Vivian Richards Stadium, Antigua	25 June 2026
587	India	151.0	3.88	Won	1	England	Edgbaston Cricket Ground, Birmingham	2 July 2025
575/8d	New Zealand	153.4	3.22	Won	1	West Indies	Bay Oval, Mount Maunganui	18 December 2025
Source: ESPNcricinfo | d=Declared | Last updated: 22 November 2026

==== Lowest team totals ====
Score	Team	Overs	RR	Result	Inns	Opposition	Venue	Date
27	West Indies	14.3	1.86	Lost	4	Australia	Sabina Park, Kingston	12 July 2025
64	Bangladesh	34	1.88	Lost	1	Australia	Great Barrier Reef Arena, Mackay	22 August 2026
93	India	35	2.65	Lost	4	South Africa	Eden Gardens, Kolkata	14 November 2025
95	Bangladesh	38.3	2.48	Lost	3	Australia	Great Barrier Reef Arena, Mackay	23 August 2026
98	Sri Lanka	35.3	2.76	Lost	1	Pakistan	Rawalpindi Cricket Stadium, Rawalpindi	17 November 2026
Source: ESPNcricinfo | Bowled out totals only | Last updated: 20 November 2026

=== Partnership statistics ===
==== Highest partnership by wicket ====
Wkt	Runs	Batters		Team	Opposition	Venue	Match date
1st	323	Tom Latham	Devon Conway	New Zealand	West Indies	Bay Oval, Mount Maunganui	18 December 2025
2nd	202	Marques Ackerman	Zubayr Hamza	South Africa	Bangladesh	Wanderers Stadium, Johannesburg	15 November 2026
3rd	279	Tom Latham	Rachin Ravindra	New Zealand	West Indies	Hagley Oval, Christchurch	2 December 2025
4th	264	Najmul Hossain Shanto	Mushfiqur Rahim	Bangladesh	Sri Lanka	Galle International Stadium, Galle	17 June 2025
5th	249	Kusal Mendis	Dhananjaya de Silva	Sri Lanka	Pakistan	Rawalpindi Cricket Stadium, Rawalpindi	9 November 2026
6th	401	Amir Jangoo	Roston Chase	West Indies	Sri Lanka	Sir Vivian Richards Stadium, Antigua	25 June 2026
7th	180*	Justin Greaves	Kemar Roach	West Indies	New Zealand	Hagley Oval, Christchurch	2 December 2025
8th	183	Temba Bavuma	Simon Harmer	South Africa	Australia	St George's Park, Gqeberha	18 October 2026
9th	134	Matt Renshaw	Nathan Lyon	Australia	South Africa	Kingsmead Cricket Ground, Durban	9 October 2026
10th	98	Senuran Muthusamy	Kagiso Rabada	South Africa	Pakistan	Rawalpindi Cricket Stadium, Rawalpindi	20 October 2025
Source: ESPNcricinfo | Last updated: 16 November 2026

==== Highest partnership by runs ====
Runs	Wkt	Batters		Team	Opposition	Venue	Match date
401	6th	Amir Jangoo	Roston Chase	West Indies	Sri Lanka	Sir Vivian Richards Stadium, Antigua	25 June 2026
323	1st	Tom Latham	Devon Conway	New Zealand	West Indies	Bay Oval, Mount Maunganui	18 December 2025
317	1st	Tom Latham	Devon Conway	New Zealand	England	Trent Bridge, Nottingham	25 June 2026
303	6th	Jamie Smith	Harry Brook	England	India	Edgbaston Cricket Ground, Birmingham	2 July 2025
279	3rd	Tom Latham	Rachin Ravindra	New Zealand	West Indies	Hagley Oval, Christchurch	2 December 2025
Source: ESPNcricinfo | Last updated: 2 July 2026
