= South African cricket team in India in 2025–26 =

International cricket tour

	India	South Africa
- Dates: 14 November – 19 December 2025
Captains	Shubman Gill (Note: Rishabh Pant captained India in the 2nd Test.) (Tests); KL Rahul (ODIs); Suryakumar Yadav (T20Is)	Temba Bavuma (Note: Aiden Markram captained South Africa in the 1st ODI.) (Tests & ODIs); Aiden Markram (T20Is)

Test series
- Result: South Africa won the 2-match series 2–0
Most runs	Washington Sundar (124)	Tristan Stubbs (163)
Most wickets	Ravindra Jadeja (10)	Simon Harmer (17)
- Player of the series: Simon Harmer (SA)

One Day International series
- Results: India won the 3-match series 2–1
Most runs	Virat Kohli (302)	Matthew Breetzke (164)
Most wickets	Kuldeep Yadav (9)	Marco Jansen (4)
- Player of the series: Virat Kohli (Ind)

Twenty20 International series
- Results: India won the 5-match series 3–1
Most runs	Tilak Varma (187)	Quinton de Kock (156)
Most wickets	Varun Chakravarthy (10)	Lungi Ngidi (6)
- Player of the series: Varun Chakravarthy (Ind)

The South African cricket team toured India in November and December 2025 to play the Indian cricket team. The tour consisted of two Test, three One Day International (ODI) and five Twenty20 International (T20I) matches. The Test series formed part of the 2025–2027 ICC World Test Championship. In April 2025, the Board of Control for Cricket in India (BCCI) confirmed the fixtures for the tour, as a part of the 2025–26 home international season.

The venue for the 1st Test was updated from New Delhi to Kolkata in June 2025.

== Squads ==
India			South Africa		
Tests	ODIs	T20Is	Tests	ODIs	T20Is
Shubman Gill (c); Rishabh Pant (vc, wk); Jasprit Bumrah; Akash Deep; Ravindra Jadeja; Yashasvi Jaiswal; Dhruv Jurel (wk); Devdutt Padikkal; Axar Patel; KL Rahul; Nitish Kumar Reddy (Note: In squad for second Test only.); Mohammed Siraj; Sai Sudharsan; Washington Sundar; Kuldeep Yadav	KL Rahul (c, wk); Ruturaj Gaikwad; Ravindra Jadeja; Yashasvi Jaiswal; Dhruv Jurel; Virat Kohli; Prasidh Krishna; Rishabh Pant (wk); Harshit Rana; Nitish Kumar Reddy; Rohit Sharma; Arshdeep Singh; Washington Sundar; Tilak Varma; Kuldeep Yadav	Suryakumar Yadav (c); Shubman Gill (vc); Shahbaz Ahmed (Note: In squad for 4th and 5th T20Is only.); Jasprit Bumrah; Varun Chakaravarthy; Shivam Dube; Hardik Pandya; Axar Patel; Harshit Rana; Sanju Samson (wk); Abhishek Sharma; Jitesh Sharma (wk); Arshdeep Singh; Washington Sundar; Tilak Varma; Kuldeep Yadav	Temba Bavuma (c); Corbin Bosch; Dewald Brevis; Tony de Zorzi; Zubayr Hamza; Simon Harmer; Marco Jansen; Keshav Maharaj; Aiden Markram; Wiaan Mulder; Senuran Muthusamy; Lungi Ngidi; ~~Kagiso Rabada~~; Ryan Rickelton (wk); Tristan Stubbs; Kyle Verreynne (wk)	Temba Bavuma (c); Aiden Markram (vc); Ottniel Baartman; Corbin Bosch; Matthew Breetzke; Dewald Brevis; Nandre Burger; Quinton de Kock (wk); Tony de Zorzi; Rubin Hermann; Keshav Maharaj; Marco Jansen; Ryan Rickelton (wk); Prenelan Subrayen	Aiden Markram (c); Ottniel Baartman; Corbin Bosch; Dewald Brevis; Quinton de Kock (wk); ~~Tony de Zorzi~~; Donovan Ferreira; Reeza Hendricks; Marco Jansen; George Linde; Keshav Maharaj; ~~Kwena Maphaka~~; David Miller; Lungi Ngidi; Anrich Nortje; Lutho Sipamla; Tristan Stubbs

On 12 November, Nitish Kumar Reddy was released from squad for the first Test to join the India A squad for the unofficial ODI series against South Africa A. On 21 November, Shubman Gill was ruled out of the second Test due to a neck injury. On 15 December, Axar Patel was ruled out of the remaining T20I series due to an illness and was replaced by Shahbaz Ahmed.

On 18 November, Lungi Ngidi was added to the Test squad as cover for Kagiso Rabada. On 21 November, Kagiso Rabada was ruled out of the second Test due to a rib bone stress injury. On 6 December, Tony de Zorzi was ruled out of the T20I series due to injury and Kwena Maphaka was withdrew himself from the T20I series and Lutho Sipamla was named as his replacement.

== Test series ==
=== 1st Test ===
14–16 November 2025
Scorecard

South Africa	v	India
159 (55 overs); Aiden Markram 31 (48); Jasprit Bumrah 5/27 (14 overs)		189 (62.2 overs); KL Rahul 39 (119); Simon Harmer 4/30 (15.2 overs)
153 (54 overs); Temba Bavuma 55* (136); Ravindra Jadeja 4/50 (20 overs)		93 (35 overs); Washington Sundar 31 (92); Simon Harmer 4/21 (14 overs)

South Africa won by 30 runs
Eden Gardens, Kolkata
Umpires: Chris Gaffaney (NZ) and Rod Tucker (Aus)
Player of the match: Simon Harmer (SA)

- South Africa won the toss and elected to bat.
- KL Rahul and Ravindra Jadeja (Ind) both scored their 4,000th run in Tests.
- World Test Championship points: South Africa 12, India 0.

=== 2nd Test ===
22–26 November 2025
Scorecard

South Africa	v	India
489 (151.1 overs); Senuran Muthusamy 109 (206); Kuldeep Yadav 4/115 (29.1 overs)		201 (83.5 overs); Yashasvi Jaiswal 58 (97); Marco Jansen 6/48 (19.5 overs)
260/5d (78.3 overs); Tristan Stubbs 94 (180); Ravindra Jadeja 4/62 (28.3 overs)		140 (63.5 overs); Ravindra Jadeja 54 (87); Simon Harmer 6/37 (23 overs)

South Africa won by 408 runs
Assam Cricket Association Stadium, Guwahati
Umpires: Richard Kettleborough (Eng) and Rod Tucker (Aus)
Player of the match: Marco Jansen (SA)

- South Africa won the toss and elected to bat.
- Rishabh Pant captained India for the first time in Tests.
- Aiden Markram (SA) played in his 50th Test match. Markram also broke the record for most catches taken (9 catches) in a Test match.
- This was the first Test to be played at this venue.
- This was the first time in the 148-year history of Test cricket that the tea break was taken before the lunch break.
- Senuran Muthusamy (SA) scored his maiden century in Tests.
- This was India's biggest Test defeat by margin of runs. This was also South Africa's first Test series victory in India after 2000.
- World Test Championship points: South Africa 12, India 0.

== ODI series ==
=== 1st ODI ===
30 November 2025
13:30 (D/N)
Scorecard

India; 349/8 (50 overs)	v	South Africa; 332 (49.2 overs)
Virat Kohli 135 (120); Ottniel Baartman 2/60 (10 overs)		Matthew Breetzke 72 (80); Kuldeep Yadav 4/68 (10 overs)

India won by 17 runs
JSCA International Stadium Complex, Ranchi
Umpires: Jayaraman Madanagopal (Ind) and Sam Nogajski (Aus)
Player of the match: Virat Kohli (Ind)

- South Africa won the toss and elected to field.
- Rohit Sharma (Ind) broke Shahid Afridi's record for the most sixes in ODIs (352).
- Virat Kohli (Ind) broke Sachin Tendulkar's record of most centuries in a single format of international cricket (52).

=== 2nd ODI ===
3 December 2025
13:30 (D/N)
Scorecard

India; 358/5 (50 overs)	v	South Africa; 362/6 (49.2 overs)
Ruturaj Gaikwad 105 (83); Marco Jansen 2/63 (10 overs)		Aiden Markram 110 (98); Arshdeep Singh 2/54 (10 overs)

South Africa won by 4 wickets
Shaheed Veer Narayan Singh International Cricket Stadium, Raipur
Umpires: Rohan Pandit (Ind) and Rod Tucker (Aus)
Player of the match: Aiden Markram (SA)

- South Africa won the toss and elected to field.
- Ruturaj Gaikwad (Ind) scored his maiden century in ODIs.
- This was the highest joint-successful ODI run-chase in India.
- This was also South Africa's highest run-chase away from home.

=== 3rd ODI ===
6 December 2025
13:30 (D/N)
Scorecard

South Africa; 270 (47.5 overs)	v	India; 271/1 (39.5 overs)
Quinton de Kock 106 (89); Kuldeep Yadav 4/41 (10 overs)		Yashasvi Jaiswal 116* (121); Keshav Maharaj 1/44 (10 overs)

India won by 9 wickets
ACA–VDCA Cricket Stadium, Visakhapatnam
Umpires: Jayaraman Madanagopal (Ind) and Sam Nogajski (Aus)
Player of the match: Yashasvi Jaiswal (Ind)

- India won the toss and elected to field.
- Quinton de Kock (SA) scored most numbers of centuries (10) by Non-Asian player in Asia, and scored 13,000th run in international cricket.
- Rohit Sharma (Ind) scored his 20,000th run in International cricket, and scored 5,000th run at home in ODIs.
- Yashasvi Jaiswal (Ind) scored his maiden century in ODIs.

== T20I series ==
=== 1st T20I ===
9 December 2025
19:00 (N)
Scorecard

India; 175/6 (20 overs)	v	South Africa; 74 (12.3 overs)
Hardik Pandya 59* (28); Lungi Ngidi 3/31 (4 overs)		Dewald Brevis 22 (14); Axar Patel 2/7 (2 overs)

India won by 101 runs
Barabati Stadium, Cuttack
Umpires: Jayaraman Madanagopal (Ind) and Virender Sharma (Ind)
Player of the match: Hardik Pandya (Ind)

- South Africa won the toss and elected to field.
- Tilak Varma (Ind) scored his 1,000th run in T20Is. He became the youngest Indian to achieve this feat.
- Hardik Pandya (Ind) hit his 100th six in T20Is.
- Jasprit Bumrah (Ind) took his 100th wicket in T20Is. He also became the first Indian bowler to take 100 wickets in all three formats of cricket.
- This was South Africa's lowest total in T20Is.

=== 2nd T20I ===
11 December 2025
19:00 (N)
Scorecard

South Africa; 213/4 (20 overs)	v	India; 162 (19.1 overs)
Quinton de Kock 90 (46); Varun Chakravarthy 2/29 (4 overs)		Tilak Varma 62 (34); Ottniel Baartman 4/24 (4 overs)

South Africa won by 51 runs
Maharaja Yadavindra Singh International Cricket Stadium, Mullanpur
Umpires: K. N. Ananthapadmanabhan (Ind) and Rohan Pandit (Ind)
Player of the match: Quinton de Kock (SA)

- India won the toss and elected to bowl/field
- This was the first T20I to be played at this venue.

=== 3rd T20I ===
14 December 2025
19:00 (N)
Scorecard

South Africa; 117 (20 overs)	v	India; 120/3 (15.5 overs)
Aiden Markram 61 (46); Varun Chakravarthy 2/11 (4 overs)		Abhishek Sharma 35 (18); Corbin Bosch 1/18 (3 overs)

India won by 7 wickets
Himachal Pradesh Cricket Association Stadium, Dharamshala
Umpires: Jayaraman Madanagopal (Ind) and Virender Sharma (Ind)
Player of the match: Arshdeep Singh (Ind)

- India won the toss and elected to field.
- Kuldeep Yadav (Ind) played in his 50th T20I match.
- Hardik Pandya (Ind) took his 100th wicket in T20Is.
- Varun Chakravarthy (Ind) took his 50th wicket in T20Is.

=== 4th T20I ===
17 December 2025
19:00 (N)
Scorecard

India	v	South Africa

Match abandoned
Ekana Cricket Stadium, Lucknow
Umpires: K. N. Ananthapadmanabhan (Ind) and Rohan Pandit (Ind)

- No toss.
- No play was possible due to excessive fog.

=== 5th T20I ===
19 December 2025
19:00 (N)
Scorecard

India; 231/5 (20 overs)	v	South Africa; 201/8 (20 overs)
Tilak Varma 73 (42); Corbin Bosch 2/44 (3 overs)		Quinton de Kock 65 (35); Varun Chakravarthy 4/53 (4 overs)

India won by 30 runs
Narendra Modi Stadium, Ahmedabad
Umpires: Rohan Pandit (Ind) and Virender Sharma (Ind)
Player of the match: Hardik Pandya (Ind)

- South Africa won the toss and elected to field.
- Quinton de Kock (SA) played in his 100th T20I match.
- Shivam Dube (Ind) played in his 50th T20I match.
- Sanju Samson (Ind) scored his 1,000th run in T20Is.
- Hardik Pandya (Ind) scored his 2,000th run in T20Is.
