= West Indian cricket team in India in 2025–26 =

International cricket tour

	India	West Indies
- Dates: 2 – 14 October 2025
Captains	Shubman Gill	Roston Chase

Test series
- Result: India won the 2-match series 2–0
Most runs	Yashasvi Jaiswal (219)	Shai Hope (166)
Most wickets	Kuldeep Yadav (12)	Jomel Warrican (5); Roston Chase (5)
- Player of the series: Ravindra Jadeja (Ind)

The West Indies cricket team toured India in October 2025 to play the India cricket team. The tour consisted of two Test matches. The Test series formed part of the 2025–2027 ICC World Test Championship. In April 2025, the Board of Control for Cricket in India (BCCI) confirmed the fixtures for the tour, as a part of the 2025–26 home international season.

The venue for the 2nd Test was updated from Kolkata to New Delhi in June 2025.

== Squads ==
India	West Indies
Shubman Gill (c); Ravindra Jadeja (vc); Jasprit Bumrah; Yashasvi Jaiswal; Narayan Jagadeesan (wk); Dhruv Jurel (wk); Prasidh Krishna; Nitish Kumar Reddy; Devdutt Padikkal; Axar Patel; KL Rahul; Mohammed Siraj; Sai Sudharsan; Washington Sundar; Kuldeep Yadav	Roston Chase (c); Jomel Warrican (vc); Kevlon Anderson; Alick Athanaze; Jediah Blades; John Campbell; Tagenarine Chanderpaul; Justin Greaves; Shai Hope (wk); Tevin Imlach (wk); ~~Alzarri Joseph~~; ~~Shamar Joseph~~; Brandon King; Johann Layne; Anderson Phillip; Khary Pierre; Jayden Seales

On 26 September, Shamar Joseph was ruled out of the series due to injury and was replaced by Johann Layne. On 29 September, Alzarri Joseph was ruled out of the series due to back injury and was replaced by Jediah Blades.

== Test series ==
=== 1st Test ===
2–4 October 2025
Scorecard

West Indies	v	India
162 (44.1 overs); Justin Greaves 32 (48); Mohammed Siraj 4/40 (14 overs)		448/5d (128 overs); Dhruv Jurel 125 (210); Roston Chase 2/90 (24 overs)
146 (45.1 overs); Alick Athanaze 38 (74); Ravindra Jadeja 4/54 (13 overs)

India won by an innings and 140 runs
Narendra Modi Stadium, Ahmedabad
Umpires: Richard Illingworth (Eng) and Alex Wharf (Eng)
Player of the match: Ravindra Jadeja (Ind)

- West Indies won the toss and elected to bat.
- Johann Layne and Khary Pierre (WI) both made their Test debuts.
- John Campbell (WI) scored his 1,000th run in Tests.
- Jasprit Bumrah equalled Javagal Srinath's record for the fastest Indian bowler to take 50 wickets at home in Tests, in terms of innings (24).
- Dhruv Jurel (Ind) scored his maiden century in Tests.
- World Test Championship points: India 12, West Indies 0.

=== 2nd Test ===
10–14 October 2025
Scorecard

India	v	West Indies
518/5d (134.2 overs); Yashasvi Jaiswal 175 (258); Jomel Warrican 3/98 (34 overs)		248 (81.5 overs); Alick Athanaze 41 (84); Kuldeep Yadav 5/82 (26.5 overs)
124/3 (35.2 overs); KL Rahul 58* (108); Roston Chase 2/36 (9 overs)		390 (118.5 overs) (f/o); John Campbell 115 (199); Jasprit Bumrah 3/44 (17.5 overs)

India won by 7 wickets
Arun Jaitley Cricket Stadium, New Delhi
Umpires: Richard Illingworth (Eng) and Paul Reiffel (Aus)
Player of the match: Kuldeep Yadav (Ind)

- India won the toss and elected to bat.
- Jasprit Bumrah (Ind) played in his 50th Test match.
- Yashasvi Jaiswal (Ind) scored his 3,000th run in international cricket.
- John Campbell (WI) scored his maiden century in Tests.
- World Test Championship points: India 12, West Indies 0.
