= Sri Lankan cricket team in New Zealand in 2026–27 =

International cricket tour

	New Zealand	Sri Lanka
- Dates: 16 January – 16 February 2027

Test series

One Day International series

Twenty20 International series

The Sri Lankan cricket team are scheduled to tour New Zealand from January to February 2027 to play two Tests, three One Day Internationals (ODIs) and three Twenty20 International (T20I) matches. The Test series forms part of the 2025–2027 World Test Championship cycle. In June 2026, New Zealand Cricket (NZC) confirmed the fixtures for the tour, as a part of the 2026 home international season.

== Squads ==
Tests		ODIs		T20Is	
New Zealand	Sri Lanka	New Zealand	Sri Lanka	New Zealand	Sri Lanka

== ODI series ==
=== 1st ODI ===
16 January 2027
11:00
Scorecard

New Zealand	v	Sri Lanka

McLean Park, Napier

=== 2nd ODI ===
19 January 2027
11:00
Scorecard

New Zealand	v	Sri Lanka

Basin Reserve, Wellington

=== 3rd ODI ===
22 January 2027
11:00
Scorecard

New Zealand	v	Sri Lanka

University of Otago Oval, Dunedin

== T20I series ==
=== 1st T20I ===
26 January 2027
18:00 (N)
Scorecard

New Zealand	v	Sri Lanka

Hagley Oval, Christchurch

=== 2nd T20I ===
29 January 2027
16:00 (D/N)
Scorecard

New Zealand	v	Sri Lanka

Saxton Oval, Nelson

=== 3rd T20I ===
31 January 2027
13:00
Scorecard

New Zealand	v	Sri Lanka

Saxton Oval, Nelson

== Test series ==
=== 1st Test ===
4–8 February 2027
Scorecard

New Zealand	v	Sri Lanka

Bay Oval, Tauranga

=== 2nd Test ===
12–16 February 2027
Scorecard

New Zealand	v	Sri Lanka

Seddon Park, Hamilton
