= Pakistani cricket team in the West Indies in 2026 =

International cricket tour

Pakistani cricket team in West Indies in 2026
	West Indies	Pakistan
- Dates: 25 July – 6 August 2026
Captains	Roston Chase	Babar Azam

Test series
- Result: 2-match series drawn 1–1
Most runs	Shai Hope (146)	Babar Azam (193)
Most wickets	Jayden Seales (8)	Mohammad Ali (9)
- Player of the series: Justin Greaves (WI); Babar Azam (Pak)

The Pakistan cricket team toured the West Indies in July and August 2026 to play a two match Test series against the West Indies cricket team. In May 2026, Cricket West Indies (CWI) confirmed the fixtures for the tour, as a part of the 2026 home international season. The Test series formed part of the 2025–2027 ICC World Test Championship.

== Squads ==
West Indies	Pakistan
Roston Chase (c); Jomel Warrican (vc); Joshua Bishop; Tagenarine Chanderpaul; Joshua Da Silva (wk); Justin Greaves; Kavem Hodge; Shai Hope (wk); Amir Jangoo (wk); Shamar Joseph; Brandon King; Kirk McKenzie; Keemo Paul; Kemar Roach; Jayden Seales	Babar Azam (c); Mohammad Abbas; Mohammad Ali; Salman Ali Agha; Azan Awais; ~~Abdullah Fazal~~; Imam-ul-Haq; Aamir Jamal; Ghazi Ghori (wk); Sajid Khan; Shan Masood; Mohammad Rizwan (wk); Khurram Shahzad; Abdullah Shafique; Saud Shakeel; Ubaid Shah; Ali Usman; Awais Zafar

On 24 July, Abdullah Fazal was ruled out from the series due to a back injury and was replaced by Abdullah Shafique.

== Tour match ==
18–21 July 2026
Scorecard

Pakistan	v	West Indies Select XI
455/4d (136.5 overs); Babar Azam 100* (151); Ryan Bandoo 2/86 (14.5 overs)		279 (89.5 overs); Kavem Hodge 92 (130); Mohammad Ali 5/37 (15.5 overs)
219/4 (60.1 overs); Awais Zafar 64* (95); Jomel Warrican 2/36 (12 overs)

Match drawn
Brian Lara Cricket Academy, San Fernando
Umpires: Zahid Bassarath (WI) and Lyndon Rajkumar (WI)

- Pakistan won the toss and elected to bat.

== Test series ==
=== 1st Test ===
25–28 July 2026
Scorecard

West Indies	v	Pakistan
311 (98.5 overs); Shai Hope 92 (182); Mohammad Ali 4/50 (21.5 overs)		282 (80.1 overs); Shan Masood 109 (184); Justin Greaves 5/27 (11 overs)
181 (54.5 overs); Shamar Joseph 38 (27); Mohammad Abbas 5/22 (15.5 overs)		120 (40.2 overs); Babar Azam 58* (107); Jayden Seales 5/20 (14.2 overs)

West Indies won by 90 runs
Brian Lara Cricket Academy, San Fernando
Umpires: Richard Kettleborough (Eng) and Alex Wharf (Eng)
Player of the match: Justin Greaves (WI)

- West Indies won the toss and elected to bat.
- Only 67 overs were played on Day 1 due to rain.
- Ali Usman (Pak) made his Test debut.
- Justin Greaves (WI) took his maiden five-wicket haul in Tests. He also became the first player to bowl five straight wicket maidens in the history of Test cricket.
- World Test Championship points: West Indies 12, Pakistan 0.

=== 2nd Test ===
2–6 August 2026
Scorecard

West Indies	v	Pakistan
344 (105.4 overs); Justin Greaves 73 (150); Sajid Khan 4/85 (32.4 overs)		387 (115 overs); Abdullah Shafique 160* (323); Jomel Warrican 6/112 (46 overs)
117 (46.1 overs); Kavem Hodge 34 (71); Sajid Khan 4/32 (12 overs)		77/2 (23.3 overs); Babar Azam 24* (30); Jayden Seales 1/9 (12 overs)

Pakistan won by 8 wickets
Queen's Park Oval, Port of Spain
Umpires: Jayaraman Madanagopal (Ind) and Alex Wharf (Eng)
Player of the match: Abdullah Shafique (Pak)

- West Indies won the toss and elected to bat.
- Ubaid Shah and Awais Zafar (Pak) both made their Test debuts.
- World Test Championship points: Pakistan 12, West Indies 0.
