= Indian cricket team in Zimbabwe in 2022 =

International cricket tour

	Zimbabwe	India
- Dates: 18 – 22 August 2022
Captains	Regis Chakabva	KL Rahul

One Day International series
- Results: India won the 3-match series 3–0
Most runs	Sikandar Raza (143)	Shubman Gill (288)
Most wickets	Brad Evans (5)	Axar Patel (6)
- Player of the series: Shubman Gill (Ind)

The India cricket team toured Zimbabwe in August 2022 to play three One Day International (ODI) matches. The ODI series formed part of the inaugural 2020–2023 ICC Cricket World Cup Super League. Originally the series was scheduled to be played in August 2020, but, in June 2020, the Board of Control for Cricket in India (BCCI) confirmed that it had called off the tour due to the COVID-19 pandemic. However, in July 2022, the series was rescheduled to be played in August 2022. All the matches took place at the Harare Sports Club.

Shikhar Dhawan was initially named as India's captain. However, on August 11, BCCI released a media brief stating that KL Rahul would lead the team as he has cleared all medical tests, with Dhawan named as his deputy.

== Squads ==
Zimbabwe	India
Regis Chakabva (c); Ryan Burl; Tanaka Chivanga; Brad Evans; Luke Jongwe; Innocent Kaia; Takudzwanashe Kaitano; Clive Madande; Wesley Madhevere; Tadiwanashe Marumani; John Masara; Tony Munyonga; Richard Ngarava; Victor Nyauchi; Sikandar Raza; Milton Shumba; Donald Tiripano; Sean Williams	KL Rahul (c); Shikhar Dhawan (vc); Shahbaz Ahmed; Deepak Chahar; Ruturaj Gaikwad; Shubman Gill; Deepak Hooda; Avesh Khan; Ishan Kishan (wk); Prasidh Krishna; Axar Patel; Sanju Samson (wk); Mohammed Siraj; ~~Washington Sundar~~; Shardul Thakur; Rahul Tripathi; Kuldeep Yadav

Washington Sundar was ruled out of the Indian squad due to a shoulder injury attained while he was playing for Lancashire in a 2022 Royal London One-Day Cup game. Shahbaz Ahmed was announced as his replacement.

== ODI series ==
=== 1st ODI ===
18 August 2022
09:15
Scorecard

Zimbabwe; 189 (40.3 overs)	v	India; 192/0 (30.5 overs)
Regis Chakabva 35 (51); Axar Patel 3/24 (7.3 overs)		Shubman Gill 82* (72)

India won by 10 wickets
Harare Sports Club, Harare
Umpires: Adrian Holdstock (SA) and Langton Rusere (Zim)
Player of the match: Deepak Chahar (Ind)

- India won the toss and elected to field.
- World Cup Super League points: India 10, Zimbabwe 0.

=== 2nd ODI ===
20 August 2022
09:15
Scorecard

Zimbabwe; 161 (38.1 overs)	v	India; 167/5 (25.4 overs)
Sean Williams 42 (42); Shardul Thakur 3/38 (10 overs)		Sanju Samson 43* (39); Luke Jongwe 2/33 (4 overs)

India won by 5 wickets
Harare Sports Club, Harare
Umpires: Iknow Chabi (Zim) and Adrian Holdstock (SA)
Player of the match: Sanju Samson (Ind)

- India won the toss and elected to field.
- World Cup Super League points: India 10, Zimbabwe 0.

=== 3rd ODI ===
22 August 2022
09:15
Scorecard

India; 289/8 (50 overs)	v	Zimbabwe; 276 (49.3 overs)
Shubman Gill 130 (97); Brad Evans 5/54 (10 overs)		Sikandar Raza 115 (95); Avesh Khan 3/66 (9.3 overs)

India won by 13 runs
Harare Sports Club, Harare
Umpires: Adrian Holdstock (SA) and Langton Rusere (Zim)
Player of the match: Shubman Gill (Ind)

- India won the toss and elected to bat.
- Shubman Gill (Ind) scored his first century in ODIs.
- Brad Evans (Zim) took his first five-wicket haul in ODIs.
- World Cup Super League points: India 10, Zimbabwe 0.

== See also ==
- Impact of the COVID-19 pandemic on cricket
