= Indian cricket team in New Zealand in 2018–19 =

International cricket tour

| | New Zealand | India |
- Dates: 23 January – 10 February 2019
| Captains | Kane Williamson | Virat Kohli (Note: Rohit Sharma captained India for the last two ODIs.) (ODIs); Rohit Sharma (T20Is) |

One Day International series
- Results: India won the 5-match series 4–1
| Most runs | Ross Taylor (177) | Ambati Rayudu (190) |
| Most wickets | Trent Boult (12) | Mohammed Shami (9); Yuzvendra Chahal (9) |
- Player of the series: Mohammed Shami (Ind)

Twenty20 International series
- Results: New Zealand won the 3-match series 2–1
| Most runs | Tim Seifert (139) | Rohit Sharma (89) |
| Most wickets | Daryl Mitchell (4); Mitchell Santner (4) | Krunal Pandya (4); Khaleel Ahmed (4) |
- Player of the series: Tim Seifert (NZ)

The India cricket team toured New Zealand in January and February 2019 to play five One Day Internationals (ODIs) and three Twenty20 International (T20I) matches. The ODI fixtures were part of both teams' preparation for the 2019 Cricket World Cup, with India winning the series 4–1. The T20I matches took place on the same day as the corresponding women's fixtures at the same venues. New Zealand won the T20I series 2–1, and ended India's run of ten T20I series without defeat. It was the first time that India had lost a T20I bilateral series of three or more matches.

== Squads ==
| ODIs | | T20Is | |
| New Zealand | India | New Zealand | India |
|---|---|---|---|
| Kane Williamson (c); Todd Astle; Trent Boult; Doug Bracewell; Colin de Grandhomme; Lockie Ferguson; Martin Guptill; Matt Henry; Tom Latham (wk); Colin Munro; James Neesham; Henry Nicholls; Mitchell Santner; Ish Sodhi; Tim Southee; Ross Taylor | Virat Kohli (c); Rohit Sharma (vc); ~~Jasprit Bumrah~~; Yuzvendra Chahal; Shikhar Dhawan; MS Dhoni (wk); Shubman Gill; Ravindra Jadeja; Kedar Jadhav; Dinesh Karthik; Bhuvneshwar Kumar; Hardik Pandya; Vijay Shankar; Ambati Rayudu; Khaleel Ahmed; Mohammed Shami; Mohammed Siraj; Kuldeep Yadav | Kane Williamson (c); Doug Bracewell; Colin de Grandhomme; Lockie Ferguson; ~~Martin Guptill~~; Scott Kuggeleijn; Daryl Mitchell; Colin Munro; James Neesham; Mitchell Santner; Tim Seifert (wk); Ish Sodhi; Tim Southee; Ross Taylor; Blair Tickner | Rohit Sharma (c); ~~Virat Kohli (c)~~; ~~Jasprit Bumrah~~; Yuzvendra Chahal; Shikhar Dhawan; MS Dhoni (wk); Shubman Gill; Kedar Jadhav; Dinesh Karthik; Siddarth Kaul; Bhuvneshwar Kumar; Hardik Pandya; Vijay Shankar; Krunal Pandya; Rishabh Pant; ~~KL Rahul~~; Khaleel Ahmed; Mohammed Siraj; Kuldeep Yadav |

Jasprit Bumrah was rested from the tour and replaced by Mohammed Siraj in India's squad for both the ODI and T20I fixtures. Siddarth Kaul was added to India's squad for the T20I series.

On 11 January 2019, Hardik Pandya and KL Rahul were suspended by the Board of Control for Cricket in India (BCCI) following controversial comments they made on the Indian talk show Koffee with Karan earlier in the month. They were ruled out of the ODI series against Australia, and all of the fixtures on this tour. Vijay Shankar and Shubman Gill were called up as their replacements. Virat Kohli was rested for the last two ODIs and the T20I series, with Rohit Sharma named as captain of the India team in his place. On 24 January, after lifting the suspension on Pandya and Rahul, the BCCI announced that Pandya would re-join the squad for the matches in New Zealand.

James Neesham and Todd Astle were added to New Zealand's squad for the last two ODIs, replacing Doug Bracewell and Ish Sodhi respectively. Martin Guptill was ruled out of New Zealand's T20I squad due to injury and was replaced by James Neesham.

== ODI series ==
=== 1st ODI ===
23 January 2019
15:00 (D/N)
Scorecard

| New Zealand; 157 (38 overs) | v | India; 156/2 (34.5 overs) |
| Kane Williamson 64 (81); Kuldeep Yadav 4/39 (10 overs) | | Shikhar Dhawan 75* (103); Doug Bracewell 1/23 (7 overs) |

India won by 8 wickets (DLS method)
McLean Park, Napier
Umpires: Shaun George (SA) and Shaun Haig (NZ)
Player of the match: Mohammed Shami (Ind)

- New Zealand won the toss and elected to bat.
- India were set a revised target of 156 runs from 49 overs due to the setting sun.
- Kedar Jadhav (Ind) played his 50th ODI.
- Mohammed Shami became the fastest bowler for India, in terms of matches played, to take 100 wickets in ODIs (56).
- Shikhar Dhawan (Ind) scored his 5,000th run in ODIs.

=== 2nd ODI ===
26 January 2019
15:00 (D/N)
Scorecard

| India; 324/4 (50 overs) | v | New Zealand; 234 (40.2 overs) |
| Rohit Sharma 87 (96); Trent Boult 2/61 (10 overs) | | Doug Bracewell 57 (46); Kuldeep Yadav 4/45 (10 overs) |

India won by 90 runs
Bay Oval, Mount Maunganui
Umpires: Chris Brown (NZ) and Nigel Llong (Eng)
Player of the match: Rohit Sharma (Ind)

- India won the toss and elected to bat.
- Trent Boult (NZ) took his 400th wicket across all formats of international cricket.
- This was India's biggest win, in terms of runs, against New Zealand in New Zealand.

=== 3rd ODI ===
28 January 2019
15:00 (D/N)
Scorecard

| New Zealand; 243 (49 overs) | v | India; 245/3 (43 overs) |
| Ross Taylor 93 (106); Mohammed Shami 3/41 (9 overs) | | Rohit Sharma 62 (77); Trent Boult 2/40 (10 overs) |

India won by 7 wickets
Bay Oval, Mount Maunganui
Umpires: Shaun George (SA) and Wayne Knights (NZ)
Player of the match: Mohammed Shami (Ind)

- New Zealand won the toss and elected to bat.

=== 4th ODI ===
31 January 2019
15:00 (D/N)
Scorecard

| India; 92 (30.5 overs) | v | New Zealand; 93/2 (14.4 overs) |
| Yuzvendra Chahal 18* (37); Trent Boult 5/21 (10 overs) | | Ross Taylor 37* (25); Bhuvneshwar Kumar 2/25 (5 overs) |

New Zealand won by 8 wickets
Seddon Park, Hamilton
Umpires: Chris Brown (NZ) and Nigel Llong (Eng)
Player of the match: Trent Boult (NZ)

- New Zealand won the toss and elected to field.
- Shubman Gill (Ind) made his ODI debut.
- Rohit Sharma (Ind) played his 200th ODI.
- Trent Boult claimed his fifth five-wicket haul in ODIs, the joint-most for New Zealand alongside Richard Hadlee.
- Trent Boult also became the second bowler to take 100 wickets in New Zealand, and the fastest to reach the milestone by any bowler in a country, in terms of matches (49).
- This was India's lowest total in New Zealand in ODIs.
- This was also India's biggest defeat, in terms of balls remaining, in ODIs (212).

=== 5th ODI ===
3 February 2019
15:00 (D/N)
Scorecard

| India; 252 (49.5 overs) | v | New Zealand; 217 (44.1 overs) |
| Ambati Rayudu 90 (113); Matt Henry 4/35 (10 overs) | | James Neesham 44 (32); Yuzvendra Chahal 3/41 (10 overs) |

India won by 35 runs
Wellington Regional Stadium, Wellington
Umpires: Shaun George (SA) and Wayne Knights (NZ)
Player of the match: Ambati Rayudu (Ind)

- India won the toss and elected to bat.

== T20I series ==
=== 1st T20I ===
6 February 2019
20:00 (N)
Scorecard

| New Zealand; 219/6 (20 overs) | v | India; 139 (19.2 overs) |
| Tim Seifert 84 (43); Hardik Pandya 2/51 (4 overs) | | MS Dhoni 39 (31); Tim Southee 3/17 (4 overs) |

New Zealand won by 80 runs
Wellington Regional Stadium, Wellington
Umpires: Chris Brown (NZ) and Shaun Haig (NZ)
Player of the match: Tim Seifert (NZ)

- India won the toss and elected to field.
- Daryl Mitchell (NZ) made his T20I debut.
- This was India's second biggest losing margin, in terms of runs, in T20Is.

=== 2nd T20I ===
8 February 2019
19:00 (N)
Scorecard

| New Zealand; 158/8 (20 overs) | v | India; 162/3 (18.5 overs) |
| Colin de Grandhomme 50 (28); Krunal Pandya 3/28 (4 overs) | | Rohit Sharma 50 (29); Daryl Mitchell 1/15 (1 over) |

India won by 7 wickets
Eden Park, Auckland
Umpires: Chris Brown (NZ) and Wayne Knights (NZ)
Player of the match: Krunal Pandya (Ind)

- New Zealand won the toss and elected to bat.
- Rohit Sharma (Ind) became the third batsman to hit 100 sixes in T20Is.
- This was India's first win against New Zealand in New Zealand in T20Is.

=== 3rd T20I ===
10 February 2019
20:00 (N)
Scorecard

| New Zealand; 212/4 (20 overs) | v | India; 208/6 (20 overs) |
| Colin Munro 72 (40); Kuldeep Yadav 2/26 (4 overs) | | Vijay Shankar 43 (28); Daryl Mitchell 2/27 (3 overs) |

New Zealand won by 4 runs
Seddon Park, Hamilton
Umpires: Shaun Haig (NZ) and Wayne Knights (NZ)
Player of the match: Colin Munro (NZ)

- India won the toss and elected to field.
- Blair Tickner (NZ) made his T20I debut.
