= KL Rahul =

Indian cricketer (born 1992)

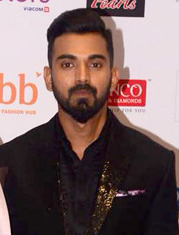
- Rahul in 2018

Personal information
- Full name: Kannaur Lokesh Rahul
- Born: 18 April 1992 (age 34); Bangalore, Karnataka, India
- Nickname: KLR
- Batting: Right-handed
- Role: Wicket-keeper-batter
- Relatives: Athiya Shetty (m. 2023)

International information
- National side: India (2014–present)
- Test debut (cap 284): 26 December 2014 v Australia
- Last Test: 6 June 2026 v Afghanistan
- ODI debut (cap 213): 11 June 2016 v Zimbabwe
- Last ODI: 3 October 2026 v West Indies
- ODI shirt no.: 1
- T20I debut (cap 63): 18 June 2016 v Zimbabwe
- Last T20I: 10 November 2022 v England
- T20I shirt no.: 1

Domestic team information
- Years: Team
- 2010–present: Karnataka
- 2013, 2016: Royal Challengers Bangalore
- 2014–2015: Sunrisers Hyderabad
- 2018–2021: Punjab Kings
- 2022–2024: Lucknow Super Giants
- 2025–present: Delhi Capitals

Career statistics
Competition	Test	ODI	T20I	FC
Matches	70	101	72	124
Runs scored	4,288	3,541	2,265	9,237
Batting average	36.65	51.32	37.75	45.05
100s/50s	12/21	9/20	2/22	26/42
Top score	199	129*	110*	337
Catches/stumpings	89/–	85/9	23/1	154/–
Medal record
Men's cricket
Representing India
ICC Cricket World Cup
Runner-up	2023 India
ICC Champions Trophy
Winner	2025 Pakistan
ACC Asia Cup
Winner	2018 UAE
Winner	2023 Pakistan
ACC Emerging Asia Cup
Winner	2013 Singapore
- Source: ESPNcricinfo, 18 January 2026

Kannaur Lokesh Rahul (Kannada: [kaɳːuːɾ loːkeːʃ ɾaːhul]; born 18 April 1992) is an Indian cricketer who plays for the Indian national team. He is a former captain for the national team. Rahul represents the Karnataka cricket team in Indian domestic cricket and Delhi Capitals in the Indian Premier League. He is currently the vice-captain of the Indian cricket team in the Test format.

Rahul made his international debut in 2014 against Australia in the Boxing Day Test in Melbourne. Two years after his Test debut, Rahul made his One-Day International debut in 2016 against Zimbabwe, where he scored his first century by hitting a six on the last ball to reach 100* (115) from 94 (114), which was also the only six of the entire match. Rahul is the first and only Indian cricketer to score an ODI century on his debut. On the same tour, he made his T20I debut.

== Early and personal life ==
Kannaur Lokesh Rahul was born on 18 April 1992 to KN Lokesh and Rajeshwari in Bangalore, Karnataka . His father is a professor and former director at the National Institute of Technology Karnataka (NITK) in Mangalore. His mother, Rajeshwari, is a professor at Mangalore University. His father was a fan of cricketer Sunil Gavaskar and wanted to name his own son after Gavaskar's son but mistook Rohan Gavaskar's name for Rahul.

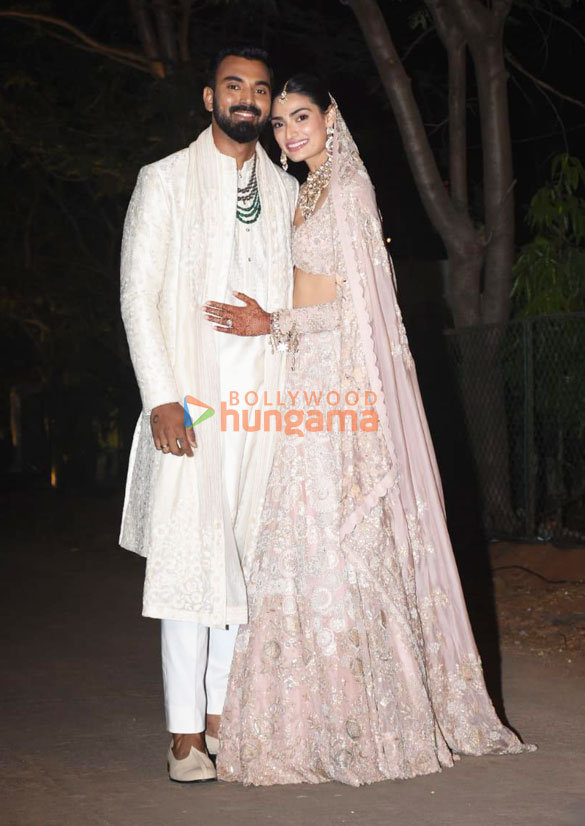
KL Rahul with wife Athiya Shetty pose for paps after their wedding rituals

Rahul grew up in Surathkal, Mangalore, completing his Class 10 at NITK English Medium School and Class 12 at St. Aloysius PU College. He started cricket training at the age of 10, and, two years later, started playing matches for both Bangalore United Cricket Club and his club in Mangalore. At age 18, he moved to Bangalore to study at Jain University and pursue his cricket career.

On 23 January 2023, Rahul married his long-time girlfriend, actress Athiya Shetty daughter of actor Sunil Shetty, after dating for more than three years. Shetty gave birth to a girl, on 24 March 2025.

== Domestic career ==
Rahul made his first-class cricket debut for Karnataka in the 2010–11 season. In the same season, he represented his country at the 2010 ICC Under-19 Cricket World Cup, scoring 143 runs in the competition. He made his debut in the Indian Premier League in 2013, for Royal Challengers Bangalore. During the 2013–14 Ranji Trophy, he scored 1,033 runs, the second-highest total in the tournament.

Playing for South Zone in the final of the 2014–15 Duleep Trophy against Central Zone, Rahul scored 185 off 233 balls in the first innings and 130 off 152 in the second. He was named the player of the match and selected to the Indian Test squad for the Australian tour followed.

Returning home after the Test series, Rahul became Karnataka's first triple-centurion, scoring 337 against Uttar Pradesh. He went on to score 188 in the 2014–15 Ranji Trophy final against Tamil Nadu and finished the season with an average of 93.11 in the nine matches he played.

In January 2026, Rahul returned to represent Karnataka in the Vijay Hazare Trophy after a six-year gap, having last appeared in the tournament in 2019.

== International career ==
=== Debut and early career (2014–2021) ===
Rahul made his Test debut in the 2014 Boxing Day Test at the Melbourne Cricket Ground. He replaced Rohit Sharma and was presented with his Test cap by MS Dhoni. He managed to score only 3 and 1 on his debut. In the next test at Sydney where he opened the innings for the first time, and made his maiden international century, scoring 110 runs.

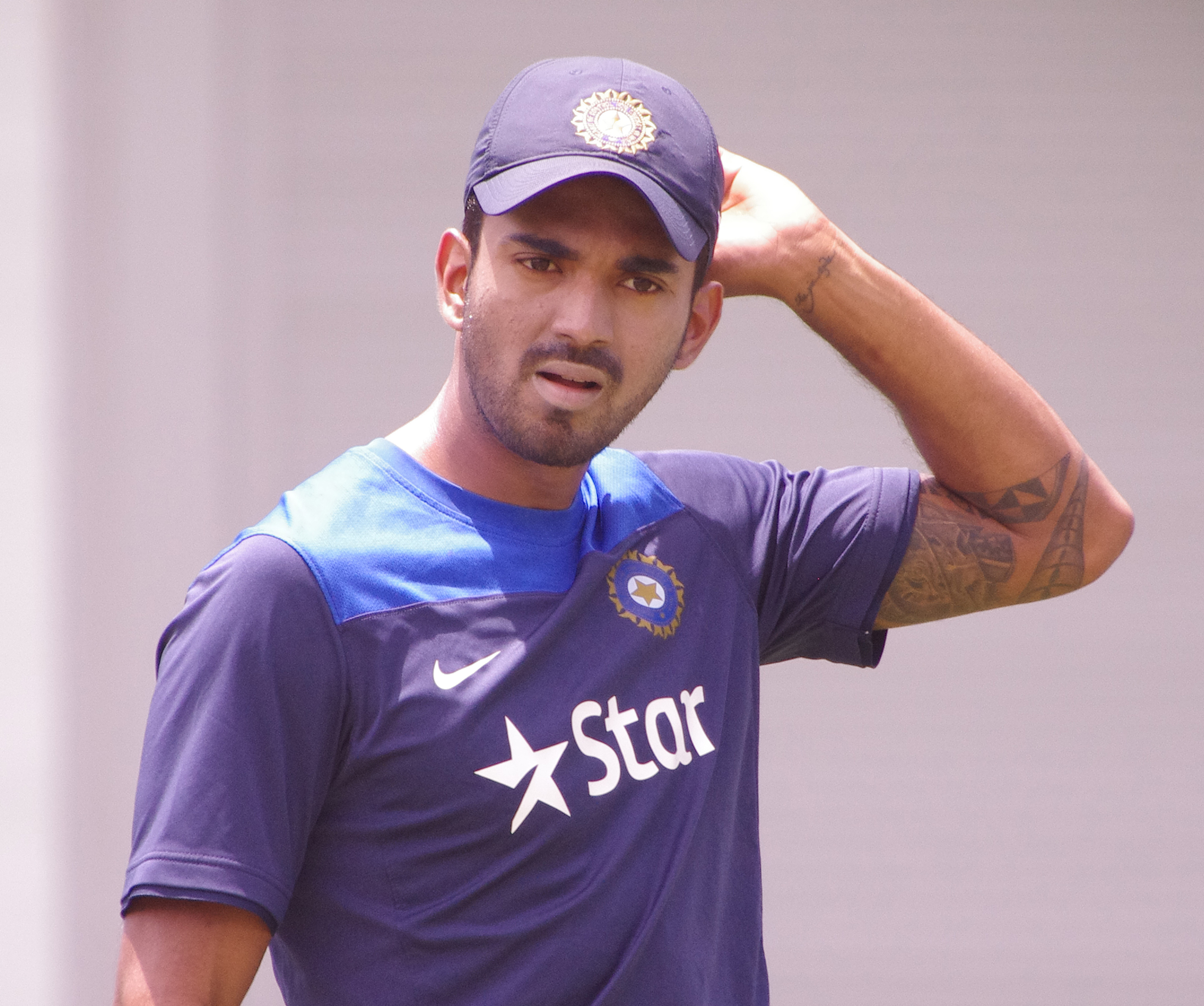
Rahul in 2015

He was named in the 15-man squad for the Indian tour of Bangladesh in June 2015 but withdrew due to dengue. He returned to the team for the first Test of the Sri Lankan tour after Murali Vijay was ruled out due to injury, scoring his second Test century and winning the Man of the Match award. During the match, he kept wicket after Wriddhiman Saha was injured.

In July 2016, Rahul was named in the squad for India tour of West Indies. In the second series test, Rahul scored 158 runs, his then-highest score in test cricket. In September 2016, he was named in the squad for the home series against New Zealand. After the first test, he was replaced by Gautam Gambhir due to an injury.

Rahul was selected in the squad against England in the 2016-17 Test series but was injured while training in the nets. He was ruled out of the third test, but he made his comeback to the team in the fourth test but failed to make an impact. In the fifth and final test of the series, Rahul went on to make his fourth test ton, scoring his career-best 199 runs.

Rahul was named in the squad to tour Zimbabwe in 2016. He made his One Day International (ODI) debut against Zimbabwe at Harare Sports Club. Rahul scored an unbeaten 100*(115) on debut, thus becoming the first Indian cricketer to score a century on an ODI debut. He was named the man of the series. He made his Twenty20 International (T20I) debut later in the same tour. Rahul got out on a golden duck on his T20I debut as India lost the first T20I against Zimbabwe. Rahul was named in T20I squad for the tour of West Indies in 2016, where he made his first T20I century of just 46 balls and ended up scoring an unbeaten 110 off just 51 balls. He became the first player to score a T20I century while batting at number four in a one-run defeat while in pursuit of 246, the highest T20I run chase at that time.

In his 20th international innings, Rahul became the fastest batsman to have scored centuries in all three formats, surpassing the record of Ahmed Shehzad, who took 76 innings. On 3 July 2018, Rahul scored his second T20 International ton against England. He is also the first Indian batsman to be dismissed hit-wicket in T20Is.

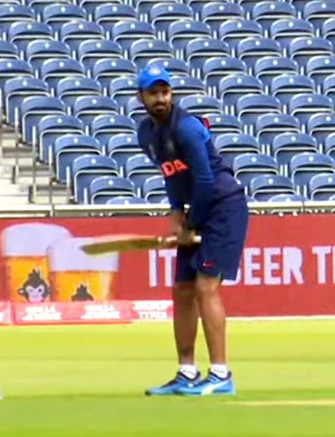
K.L. Rahul amid practice session (2019)

On 11 January 2019, Hardik Pandya and Rahul were suspended by the Board of Control for Cricket in India (BCCI) following misogynistic comments they made on the Indian talk show Koffee with Karan earlier in the month. They were both sent home ahead of the ODI series against Australia and the fixtures of India's tour to New Zealand. On 24 January 2019, after lifting the suspension on Pandya and Rahul, the BCCI announced that Rahul would re-join the squad for India A matches.

In April 2019, he was named in India's squad for the 2019 Cricket World Cup. He played at number 4 in the first two games but got back to opening the innings alongside Rohit Sharma when Shikhar Dhawan was ruled out of the rest of the tournament due to injury. Overall, Rahul scored 361 runs with two fifties and one hundred in the tournament and finished as India's third-highest run scorer in the tournament after Rohit Sharma and Virat Kohli.

Due to lack of form in the Test format, Rahul was dropped from the squad for the home Tests against South Africa. However, he remained in the limited-overs teams.

In December 2019, in the first T20I match against the West Indies, Rahul scored his 1,000th run in T20I cricket. He scored 62 (40) in the first T20I against West Indies. He scored 91 (56) in the third T20I, for which he was the Man of the Match. He scored his 3rd ODI century in the 2nd ODI against West Indies. In the 2-match T20I series against Sri Lanka, Rahul scored 45 in the first match and 54 in the second T20I.

In January 2020, Rahul made 80 (52) batting at number five in the second ODI against Australia and was rewarded as the man of the match.

In India's tour of New Zealand in 2019–20, Rahul was declared man of the series in the five-match T20I series for scoring 224 runs at an average of 56. He was also the stand-in captain in the 5th T20I after Rohit Sharma suffered a hamstring injury during the 1st innings. In the ODI series against New Zealand, he scored 88* (64) in the first ODI and scored his fourth ton in ODIs, 112 (113) in the third ODI.

In October 2020, Rahul was named as India's vice captain for the ODI and T20I series against Australia. Rahul had a moderate ODI and T20I series against Australia. He made 77 against Australia in the second ODI and 51 in the first T20I. India lost the ODI series 2–1 but won the T20I series by the same margin.

Rahul was included in the test squad for the Border-Gavaskar Trophy but was not picked in the playing XI for the first two Tests. He injured himself during practice and was ruled out of the remaining part of the tour.

As a result, he also missed the home Test series against England in February 2021. He returned to the national team for the T20I and ODI series against England. There was a dip in his form in the T20I series. He returned to form in the ODI series scoring a match-winning 62* and was involved in a 100-run partnership with debutant Krunal Pandya who scored a fifty. He continued his form by scoring 108 runs in the second ODI and was involved in another 100-run partnership with Rishabh Pant.

Rahul was named to India's test squad for their tour of England in 2021. As Shubman Gill and Mayank Agarwal were injured, Rahul opened alongside Rohit Sharma. In the first test at Trent Bridge, Rahul scored 84 and 26. He scored 129 (250) at Lords and was awarded the man of the match in the second Test. Rahul displayed excellent technical skills for batting in England, including playing the ball late and leaving the ball well. Rahul scored 315 runs in eight innings of four matches played and was the second-highest run scorer for India in the tour behind Rohit Sharma.

=== Vice-captaincy (2021–22) ===
In September 2021, Rahul was named to India's squad for the 2021 ICC Men's T20 World Cup. He was the highest run scorer for India in the tournament, scoring 194 runs including three consecutive fifties. He also scored the tournament's joint fastest fifty in just 18 balls against Scotland. After Virat Kohli stepped down as T20I captain, Rahul was appointed the vice-captain of the team in T20Is as former vice-captain Rohit Sharma was appointed the new captain of T20I format. Later, Rahul was appointed ODI vice-captain as well due to the change of captaincy.

In December 2021, Rahul was named as India's Test vice-captain for the away series against South Africa after India's regular vice-captain Rohit Sharma was ruled out of the series. Rahul was also named as the ODI captain for the One Day series of the same tour as India's regular ODI captain Rohit Sharma was ruled out of the series due to a hamstring injury. In the first test match against South Africa in December 2021, he scored 123 in India's first innings and 23 in India's second innings. For this performance, he was awarded the Man of the Match award.

In the second test against South Africa in January 2022, Rahul captained India for the first time in Test cricket and became the 34th Test captain of India. He scored a half-century on his captaincy debut. Despite his best efforts, Rahul couldn't lead the team to victory, and India lost the second Test by seven wickets. In the first ODI against South Africa, he made his debut in ODI captaincy and became the 26th ODI captain of India. However, India lost the series 3–0 to South Africa.

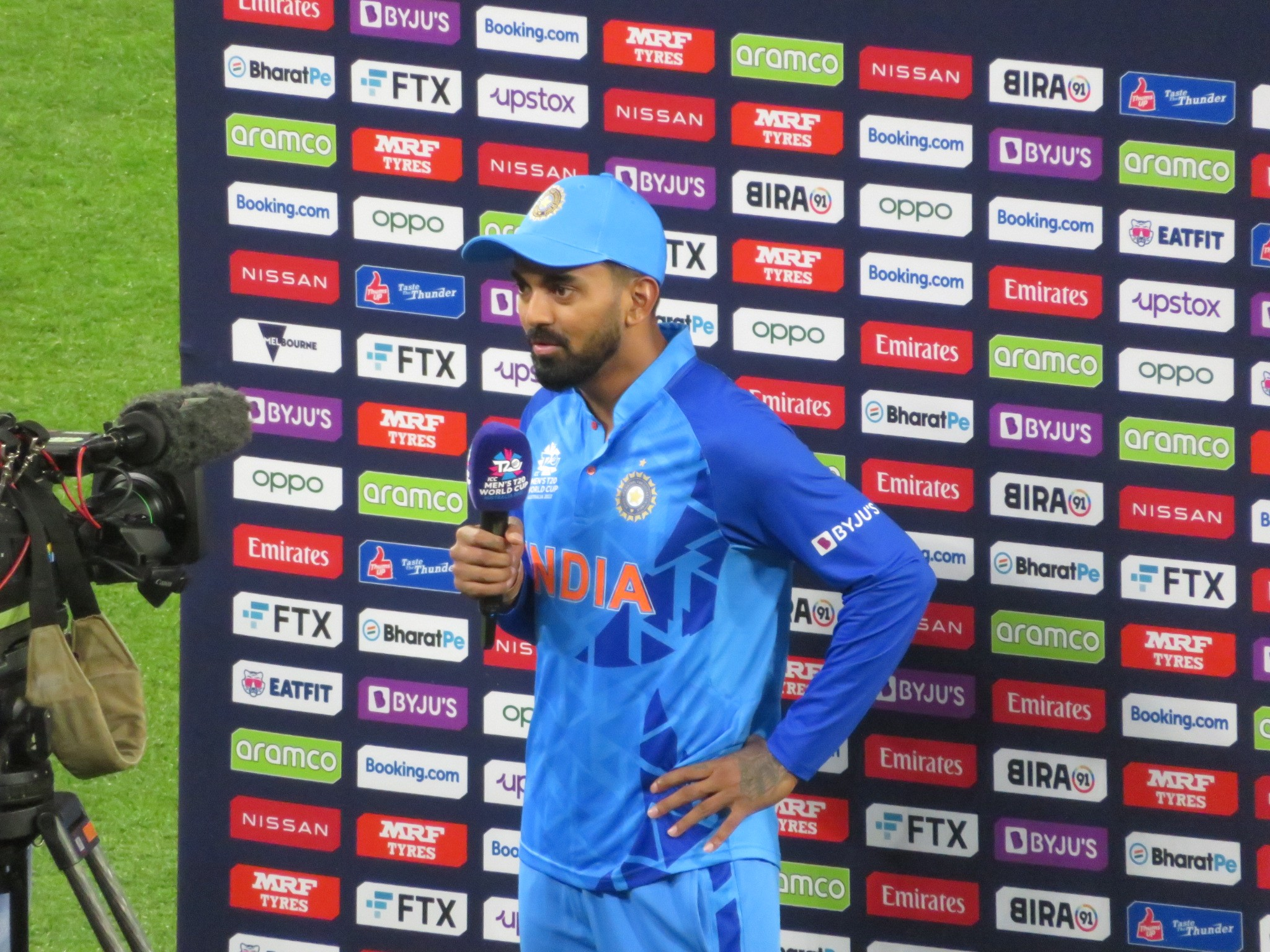
KL Rahul being interviewed during the 2022 T20 World Cup

In February 2022, during the second ODI of India against the West Indies, Rahul scored 49 (48) and completed 6000 runs in international cricket across all formats. In the same ODI, Rahul sustained an upper left hamstring strain and was ruled out of the next ODI as well as the upcoming T20Is series against the West Indies. Rahul was named captain for the South African tour of India in June, but was later ruled out of the series due to a groin injury. After a successful sports hernia surgery, Rahul came back to the team and was named captain for the India Tour of Zimbabwe in August.

Rahul was the stand-in captain for the team during the last match played by team India in the 2022 Asia Cup against Afghanistan.

Due to poor form, in February 2023 he was removed from the Test vice-captaincy, with his spot in the team questioned.

=== Recent career (2023–present) ===
Rahul made his return to cricket in Asia Cup 2023 against Pakistan. Rahul scored an unbeaten century on his return, scoring 111 off 106 balls.

Following a successful Asia Cup, Rahul was named in the squad for 2023 Cricket World Cup. Ahead of the World Cup, Rahul was named as the captain for first two ODIs for the series against Australia.

Rahul started his World Cup 2023 campaign scoring an unbeaten 97 against Australia in a tricky chase after India lost 3 wickets at the score of 2. In the final match of the group stage of the World Cup, against the Netherlands at the M. Chinnaswamy Stadium, Rahul recorded the fastest century by an Indian batter in a World Cup, when he reached the milestone in 62 deliveries. He coincidentally broke the record held by Rohit Sharma who hit a century earlier of 63 deliveries in the tournament during India's match against Afghanistan. In the final against Australia, Rahul top scored in India's first innings with 66 runs off 107 balls as they struggled to 240 and were comfortably defeated by 6-wickets. KL Rahul's slow innings in the finals was heavily criticised by experts and fans.

On 30 November, Rahul was announced as the captain for the 3 match ODI series against South Africa after the regular ODI captain Rohit Sharma had taken a break following an intense 2023 Cricket World Cup schedule. Rahul subsequently, won the series 2-1 making him the second captain after Virat Kohli to win an ODI series in South Africa.

In December 2023, during the first test match of the series between India and South Africa, Rahul scored his 8th test match century helping India to post a challenging first innings score of 245 during challenging batting conditions. He top scored that innings with 101 runs with the second highest score only being 38 runs. Despite his efforts, India ended up losing the match by an innings and 32 runs.

Rahul scored 86 and 22 in defeat in the first test of England's 2023–24 tour India. However, he missed the rest of the series through injury.

Rahul was axed from the 2024 T20 World Cup squad.

Rahul made his comeback to the ODI team post-injury against Sri Lanka where he scored 31 and 0 in the first two ODIs and was dropped from the final ODI of the series, India ended up losing the series 2–0, their first bilateral loss against Sri Lanka since 1997.

Rahul was named in the squad for the 2-match Test series against Bangladesh in September 2024. Rahul scored a quick-fire 68 off just 62 deliveries in the rain-affected second test to help India secure a victory. Rahul was named in the Test squad against New Zealand where he failed to score in the first test, making scores of 0 and 12 and was dropped from the starting 11 for the remaining series.

Following a failed series against New Zealand he was named in the India A squad and main squad for the Border-Gavaskar Trophy. Rahul started the series as an opener and managed to score two half centuries later he was sent to one-down in the last two matches. He ended the series as the third highest scorer for India, scoring 276 runs at an average of 30.66.

Rahul was selected in the ODI squad for the home series against England and Champions Trophy 2025. He was later selected in the test series against England in June and July, where he had a good series scoring 532 runs at an average of 58.00 and 2 centuries and 2 half centuries in 5 matches. In the first test of the two-match home series against West Indies, Rahul went on to make his 11th Test hundred - his second at home since 2016.

In November 2025, Rahul was appointed stand-in captain of the Indian One Day International (ODI) team for the home series against South Africa, following the absence of regular captain Shubman Gill due to injury. Under his leadership, India won the three-match ODI series 2–1. In May 2026, ahead of the Afghanistan one-off test series, Rahul was appointed as the vice-captain of the Indian test cricket team. He replaced Rishabh Pant.

During the first Test of the series during India's tour of New Zealand in November 2026, Rahul hit a century in the 2nd innings, making him only the 5th player in ICT history to have hit a century in all 4 SENA nations.

== Indian Premier League ==
=== Debut and early seasons (2013–2017) ===
Rahul made his Indian Premier League (IPL) debut for Royal Challengers Bangalore (RCB) during the 2013 season. Ahead of the 2014 IPL, he was bought by the Sunrisers Hyderabad for INR 1 crore.

Rahul returned to RCB ahead of the 2016 season, where he finished the season as the 11th-highest run-scorer and RCB's third, with 397 runs from 14 matches. For his performances in the 2016 IPL season, he was named as wicketkeeper in the Cricinfo and Cricbuzz IPL XI. He missed the 2017 season due to a shoulder injury.

=== Stint with Punjab Kings (2018–2021) ===
In the 2018 IPL auction, he was bought by Kings XI Punjab for INR 11 crore, the joint-third highest price. In the team's first match of the season, he scored the fastest 50 in IPL history, taking 14 balls to reach the milestone and breaking the record of Sunil Narine. In total, he scored 659 runs in the season at a strike rate of 158.41 and an average of 54.91. He finished the season as third highest run scorer, and he was named in the Cricinfo and Cricbuzz IPL XI.

KXIP retained Rahul for the 2019 season, where he was named as vice-captain. He scored his maiden IPL century, scoring 100 not out off 64 balls against Mumbai Indians. He scored 593 runs in the season with average of 53.90 and strike rate of 135.38.

On 19 December 2019, Rahul was announced as captain for the 2020 season, after former captain Ravichandran Ashwin was traded to Delhi Capitals. In the match against RCB on 24 September 2020, he scored an unbeaten 132*, then the most runs scored by an Indian batsman in an IPL match. He won the Orange Cap for scoring most runs in the season (670). He was also declared the Dream11 Gamechanger of the Season.

He was retained as the captain ahead of the 2021 season, and scored 626 runs, finishing as the team's highest scorer in the season.

=== Lucknow Super Giants (2022–2024) and Delhi Capitals (2025–present) ===
Prior to the 2022 season, Rahul was drafted by Lucknow Super Giants as their captain for INR 17 crore, making him the joint highest paid cricketer in the IPL alongside Virat Kohli.

On 16 April 2022, Rahul scored his first century for Lucknow (103* off 60) against MI. He followed this up with another unbeaten century (103* off 62) against the same opponent eight days later. Rahul led his team to play-offs in the debut season for LSG but ended up losing to RCB in the eliminator. Rahul was the highest scorer for his team, scoring 616 runs with an average of 51.33 scoring 2 centuries in the season.

Rahul was retained as the captain for Lucknow Super Giants for 2023 season, but was ruled out of the tournament mid way after sustaining an injury while fielding in a match against RCB.

In the 2024 season Rahul scored 520 runs at a strike rate of 136.13 scoring 4 half-centuries but could not captain his team to the play-offs. Rahul was publicly criticised by the owner of Lucknow Super Giants after a humiliating loss against Sunrisers Hyderabad in match no. 57 of the season where SRH defeated LSG by 10 wickets chasing the target of 166 runs in just 9.4 overs.

Rahul was released by the Lucknow Super Giants ahead of the 2025 IPL mega auction and was bought by Delhi Capitals for 14 crores.

During the 2026 IPL season, Rahul scored an unbeaten 152 runs off 67 balls against Punjab Kings at the Arun Jaitley Stadium, becoming the first Indian batter to score 150 or more in an IPL innings and recording the highest individual score by an Indian in the tournament's history. His innings, which included 14 fours and 9 sixes at a strike rate of 226.86, also became the highest score ever recorded for Delhi Capitals. He ended the season as the highest run scorer for Delhi Capitals, scoring 593 runs and finishing with a career-high IPL season strike rate of 174.41.

== International centuries ==
Rahul has scored 24 international centuries – 13 in Test cricket, 9 in One Day Internationals and 2 in Twenty20 Internationals. He is the only Indian to score a century on his ODI debut.

Test centuries
No.	Runs	Against	Pos.	Inn.	Test	Venue	H/A	Date	Result	Ref.
1	110	Australia	2	2	4/4	Sydney Cricket Ground, Sydney	Away	6 January 2015	Drawn	
2	108	Sri Lanka	2	1	2/3	P. Sara Oval, Colombo	Away	20 August 2015	Won	
3	158	West Indies	1	2	2/2	Sabina Park, Kingston	Away	30 July 2016	Drawn	
4	199	England	1	2	5/5	M. A. Chidambaram Stadium, Chennai	Home	16 December 2016	Won	
5	149	England	1	4	5/5	The Oval, London	Away	7 September 2018	Lost	
6	129	England	2	1	2/5	Lord's, London	Away	12 August 2021	Won	
7	123	South Africa	1	1	1/3	Centurion Park, Centurion	Away	26 December 2021	Won	
8	101	South Africa	6	1	1/2	Centurion Park, Centurion	Away	26 December 2023	Lost	
9	137	England	2	3	1/5	Headingley, Leeds	Away	20 June 2025	Lost	
10	100	England	2	2	3/5	Lord's, London	Away	10 July 2025	Lost	
11	100	West Indies	2	2	1/2	Narendra Modi Stadium, Ahmedabad	Home	2 October 2025	Won	
12	100	Afghanistan	2	1	1/1	Maharaja Yadavindra Singh International Stadium, Mullanpur	Home	6 June 2026	Won	
13	136	New Zealand	2	1	1/2	Basin Reserve, Wellington	Away	19 November 2026		

ODI Centuries
No	Runs	Against	Pos.	Inn.	S/R	Venue	H/A/N	Date	Result	Ref.
1	100*	Zimbabwe	1	2	86.95	Harare Sports Club, Harare	Away	11 June 2016	Won	
2	111	Sri Lanka	1	2	94.06	Headingley, Leeds	Neutral	6 July 2019	Won	
3	102	West Indies	2	1	98.07	ACA-VDCA Cricket Stadium, Vishakhapatnam	Home	18 December 2019	Won	
4	112	New Zealand	5	1	99.11	Bay Oval, Mount Maunganui	Away	11 February 2020	Lost	
5	108	England	4	1	94.73	MCA Stadium, Pune	Home	26 March 2021	Lost	
6	111*	Pakistan	4	1	104.72	R. Premadasa Stadium, Colombo	Neutral	11 September 2023	Won	
7	102	Netherlands	5	1	159.37	M. Chinnaswamy Stadium, Bangalore	Home	12 November 2023	Won	
8	112*	New Zealand	5	1	121.74	Niranjan Shah Stadium, Rajkot	Home	14 January 2026	Lost	
9	129*	West Indies	5	1	148.27	Maharaja Yadavindra Singh International Stadium, Mullanpur	Home	3 October 2026	Lost	

T20I Centuries
No.	Runs	Against	Pos.	Inn.	S/R	Venue	H/A/N	Date	Result	Ref.
1	110*	West Indies	4	2	215.68	Central Broward Park, Lauderhill	Neutral	27 August 2016	Lost	
2	101*	England	3	2	187.03	Old Trafford, Manchester	Away	3 July 2018	Won	

== Honours ==
Royal Challengers Bengaluru

- Indian Premier League runner-up: 2016

India U23

- Emerging Asia Cup: 2013

India

- ICC Cricket World Cup runner-up: 2023
- ICC Champions Trophy: 2025
- Asia Cup: 2018, 2023

== See also ==
- Sport in India – Overview of sports in India
- Sports in Karnataka
- List of cricketers with centuries in all international formats
- List of centuries scored on One Day International cricket debut
