= Shai Hope =

Barbadian cricketer

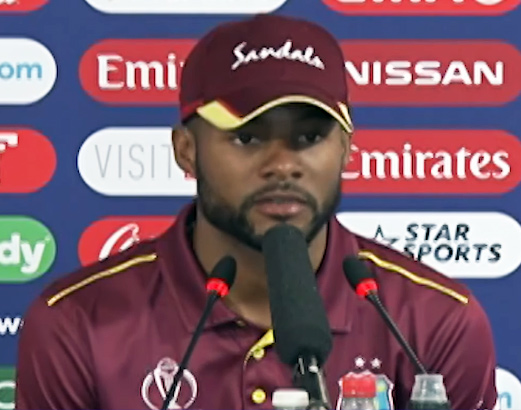
- Hope in 2019

Personal information
- Full name: Shai Diego Hope
- Born: 10 November 1993 (age 33); Saint Michael, Barbados
- Height: 1.75 m (5 ft 9 in)
- Batting: Right-handed
- Bowling: Left-arm medium
- Role: Wicket-keeper batsman
- Relatives: Kyle Hope (brother)

International information
- National side: West Indies (2015–present)
- Test debut (cap 302): 1 May 2015 v England
- Last Test: 2 August 2026 v Pakistan
- ODI debut (cap 175): 16 November 2016 v Sri Lanka
- Last ODI: 3 October 2026 v India
- ODI shirt no.: 4
- T20I debut (cap 68): 29 December 2017 v New Zealand
- Last T20I: 14 October 2026 v India

Domestic team information
- Years: Team
- 2012/13–present: Barbados
- 2015–2021: Barbados Royals
- 2022–present: Guyana Amazon Warriors
- 2023: Yorkshire
- 2023–2024: Khulna Tigers
- 2023–2024: Lahore Qalandars
- 2024: Delhi Capitals
- 2024/25: Hobart Hurricanes
- 2025: Multan Sultans
- 2026: Pretoria Capitals

Career statistics
Competition	Test	ODI	T20I	FC
Matches	49	158	74	81
Runs scored	2,518	6,590	2,004	4,847
Batting average	27.97	51.48	33.40	35.37
100s/50s	5/7	21/32	3/13	12/17
Top score	147	170	102*	215*
Catches/stumpings	77/2	159/17	30/3	111/3
- Source: Cricinfo, 10 October 2026

Shai Diego Hope (born 10 November 1993) is a Barbadian cricketer, who plays as a wicketkeeper-batsman for the West Indies cricket team. He is also the current ODI &T20I captain of the West Indies cricket team. In June 2018, he was named the Men's Cricketer of the Year, Test Cricketer of the Year and the ODI Cricketer of the Year at the annual Cricket West Indies' Awards. The following year, he was named the CWI ODI Player of the Year. He is generally regarded as one of the best ODI batsmen in the contemporary cricketing world. Hope has also twice been named, for both 2020 and 2022, in the ICC ODI Team of the Year. Hope is the first cricketer in history to hit hundreds against all Full Member nations in international cricket.

== Personal life ==
Hope has an elder brother, Kyle Hope, who also plays professional cricket. He pursued secondary schooling at Queen's College in Saint James, Barbados.

== Early and domestic career ==
Hope was further educated at Bedes Senior School in East Sussex, England under the guidance of former Sussex captain Alan Wells. Whilst at Bedes, Hope guided the 1st XI to the national 20/20 final where he scored a half century in a losing cause versus Millfield. During the 2012 season, Hope had a brief stint at local East Sussex side Chiddingly CC averaging 46 runs throughout the season with a top score of 61. He also considered remaining in the United Kingdom at that time, with the intention to qualify to play for the England cricket team.

Hope has been described by the West Indian cricket writer and commentator Tony Cozier as "A stylish No. 3 batsman whose 211 for Barbados against Windward Islands cricket team was the tournament's only double-hundred". In 2017, he was a key member of the Barbados team that won the Regional Super50, scoring centuries in both the semi-final and final, and was named man of the match in both games.

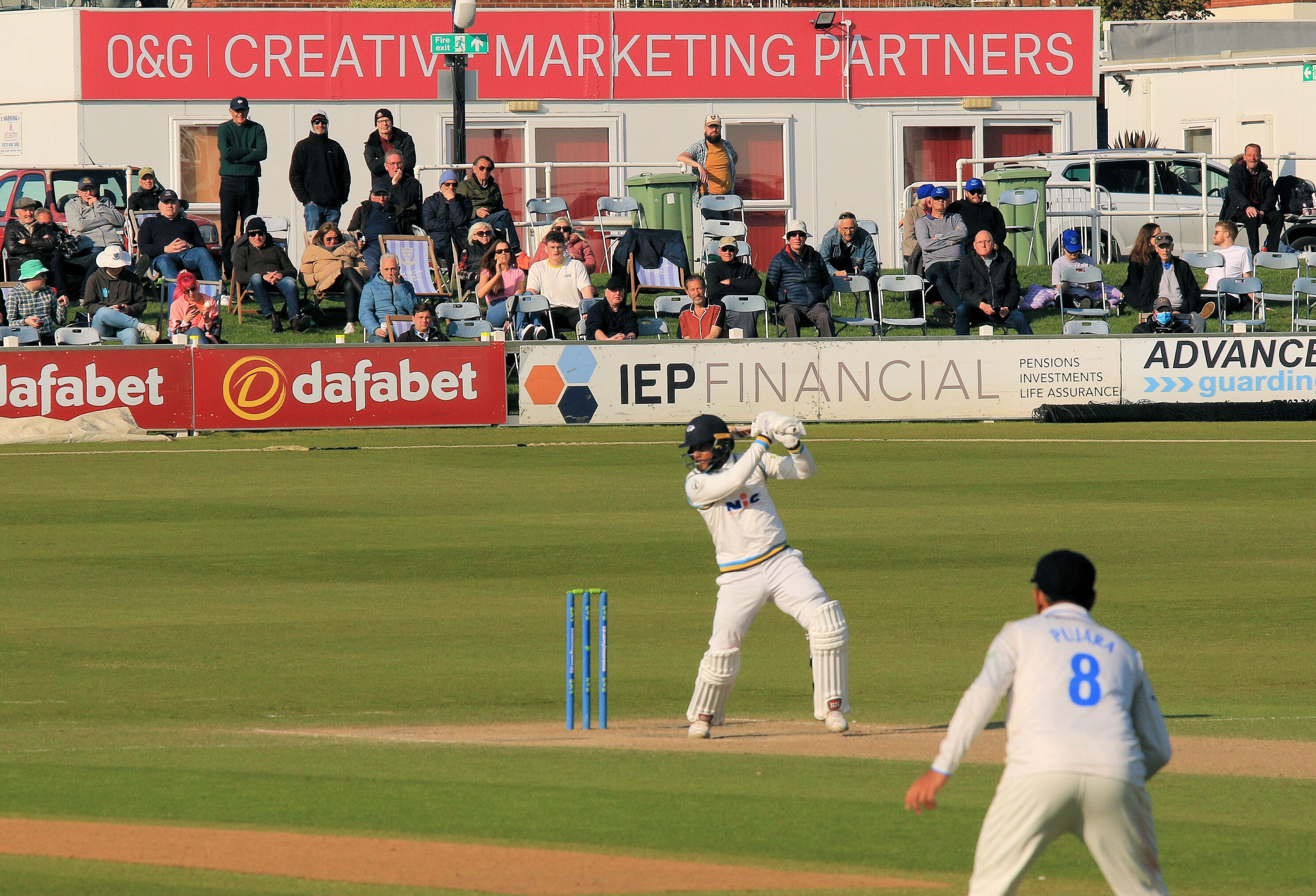
Hope batting for Yorkshire in 2023.

In November 2019, Hope was selected to play for the Rangpur Rangers in the 2019–20 Bangladesh Premier League. In July 2020, he was named in the Barbados Tridents squad for the 2020 Caribbean Premier League. On 15 October 2022 Hope was named as the new captain, replacing Jason Holder, of the Barbados Pride for the 2021-22 Regional Super50 tournament. In April of the following year, Hope joined English club Yorkshire for three games of the 2023 County Championship season. During his debut game for the club, he notched a second innings 83, in an eventual loss to Leicestershire. His second game for Yorkshire against Gloucestershire ensued without a ball bowled due to heavy rain. During Hope's final match with the side, he scored an unbeaten second-innings 53 in an eventual draw against Sussex at Hove.

== International career ==
Hope made his Test debut against England on 1 May 2015. In August 2016, he was added to the West Indies squad for their Test series against India.

Hope made his One Day International (ODI) debut in the second match of the tri-series, against Sri Lanka. His maiden ODI ton came on his second ODI, in the same tour against Zimbabwe, when he scored 101 during chasing the 257 runs. His score did not change the game, where the match ended in a tie, which is the 34th tied ODI match and the first tied ODI match between the two teams and he was adjudged man of the match for his performance.

On 25 August 2017, Hope scored his maiden Test ton in the second Test against England. He along with Kraigg Brathwaite put a 246-run partnership to lift the West Indies total to 427. Chasing 322 in the second innings, Hope scored his second hundred and guided West Indies to a 5-wicket win. In the second innings also, Brathwaite and Hope added 144 runs as well. The win was West Indies' first away victory over England since 2000 and Hope was awarded man of the match for his winning performances. Hope's two centuries in the match against England marked the first time this feat had been achieved at Headingley Cricket Ground in first-class cricket. His contribution in the 2017 tour of England was recognised in April 2018 when he was named one of the five Wisden Cricketers of the Year.

In December 2017, Hope was added to the West Indies' Twenty20 International (T20I) squad ahead of their series against New Zealand. He made his T20I debut for the West Indies against New Zealand on 29 December 2017.

In October 2018, Cricket West Indies (CWI) awarded Hope a contract across all formats of cricket for the 2018–19 season.

In May 2019, Hope played in his 50th ODI match, in the opening fixture of the 2019 Ireland Tri-Nation Series. In that match, Hope and John Campbell made 365 runs for the opening wicket. It was the highest opening partnership in ODIs, and it was also the first time that both openers for the West Indies had scored 150 runs each in an ODI match. In the next match of the tri-series, against Bangladesh, Hope became the fastest batsman for the West Indies, in terms of number of innings, to score 2,000 runs in ODIs, doing so in his 47th innings.

Hope was named in the West Indies' squad for the 2019 Cricket World Cup. The International Cricket Council (ICC) named Hope as the key player of the West Indies' squad prior to the tournament. On 17 June 2019, in the match against Bangladesh, Hope played in his 100th international match for the West Indies. Hope scored 96 runs facing 121 balls with 4 fours and a six against Bangladesh at Taunton, 17 June 2019.

On 22 December 2019, during the third match against India, Hope became the second-fastest batsman, in terms of innings, to score 3,000 runs in ODIs, doing so in his 67th innings.

He was later named in the 2019 ICC ODI team of the Year. In June 2020, Hope was named in the West Indies' Test squad, for their series against England. The Test series was originally scheduled to start in May 2020, but was moved back to July 2020 due to the COVID-19 pandemic.

On 8 June 2022 Hope went on to score 127 against Pakistan in the first game of a three match ODI series played at the Multan Cricket Stadium. In so doing he became the 3rd fastest batsman of all time to compile 4000 runs in one day internationals and the 11th West Indian batsman to accomplish this feat.

Hope played his 100th ODI match on 24 July 2022, scoring 115 against India in the second match of their bilateral series. Hope shared a fourth wicket stand of 117 with Nicholas Pooran but did so in a losing cause. He was later bestowed with the honour of being named in the 2022 ICC ODI team of the Year.

On 21 March 2023, Hope scored 128 not out to spur the Windies to eventually win the second ODI of their 2023 tour of South Africa played at Buffalo Park, East London. With this knock he became the second West Indian, after Richie Richardson, to score a century on his ODI captaincy debut. Along with Heinrich Klaasen, Hope was later jointly adjudged as the man of the ODI series.

In December 2023, he scored his 16th ODI century against England in the first game of the three-match series. He scored 109 not out off 83 balls to steer his team to a memorable victory. In the process, Hope crossed 5000 runs in ODIs, becoming the fastest ever West Indian to reach the mark, equalling the record of Sir Vivian Richards, in his 114th innings, and the 3rd fastest in the world.

In May 2024, he was named in the West Indies squad for the 2024 ICC Men's T20 World Cup tournament.

During the West Indies' tour to India in 2025–26, Hope scored 103 runs in the second innings of the second test match. This was a vital breakthrough in his test career, marking his first test century since his 118 not out against England in 2017. This knock started his significant improvement in Test Cricket. In December 2025, he then scored 140 in the first test against New Zealand in Christchurch to hang on to a draw, with the help of Justin Greaves' 202* and Kemar Roach's 58*. The West Indies scored 457/6, marking the highest fourth-innings score in Test Cricket since England's 654/6 in the famous timeless Test of 1939. Hope scored his fifth test century during Sri Lanka's tour to the West Indies, scoring a patient 112 to give his team the hope of a draw and a series win. Before this sudden improvement in Test Cricket, Hope's average was approximately 24.52 before rising suddenly to 27.58 as of July 2026 after his 112.. During the ODI leg of the 2026-2027 tour of India, Hope scored back to back centuries. During the 2nd T20I on the same tour of India , Hope hit an unbeaten 102* off 45 balls, making this his second T20I century, becoming the 3rd West Indian to hit multiple T20I hundreds.

== List of international centuries ==
Hope has scored five centuries in Test matches and 21 in One Day and 3 in T20 Internationals. His highest Test score of 147 came against England at Leeds in August 2017. His highest ODI score of 170 came against Ireland at Dublin in May 2019.

=== Key ===
- * – Remained not out
- ‡ – Captain of West Indies in that match
- † – Man of the match

=== Test centuries ===
List of Test centuries scored by Shai Hope
No.	Score	Opponent	Venue	Date	Result	Ref
1	147	England	Headingley, Leeds	25–29 August 2017	Won	
2	118*	England	Headingley, Leeds	25–29 August 2017	Won	
3	103	India	Arun Jaitley Cricket Stadium, New Delhi	10–14 October 2025	Lost	
4	140	New Zealand	Hagley Oval, Christchurch	2–6 December 2025	Drawn	
5	112	Sri Lanka	Sir Vivian Richards Stadium, North Sound	3–7 July 2026	Drawn	

=== One Day International centuries ===
List of ODI centuries scored by Shai Hope
No.	Score	Opponent	Venue	Date	Result	Ref
1	101 †	Zimbabwe	Queens Sports Club, Bulawayo	19 November 2016	Tied	
2	123*	India	ACA–VDCA Cricket Stadium, Visakhapatnam	24 October 2018	Tied	
3	146* †	Bangladesh	Shere Bangla National Stadium, Dhaka	11 December 2018	Won	
4	108*	Bangladesh	Sylhet International Cricket Stadium, Sylhet	14 December 2018	Lost	
5	170	Ireland	Castle Avenue, Dublin	5 May 2019	Won	
6	109 †	Bangladesh	Castle Avenue, Dublin	7 May 2019	Lost	
7	109* †	Afghanistan	Ekana Cricket Stadium, Lucknow	11 November 2019	Won	
8	102*	India	MA Chidambaram Stadium, Chennai	15 December 2019	Won	
9	115	Sri Lanka	Sinhalese Sports Club Ground, Colombo	22 February 2020	Lost	
10	110 †	Sri Lanka	Sir Vivian Richards Stadium, North Sound	10 March 2021	Won	
11	119* †	Netherlands	VRA Cricket Ground, Amstelveen	31 May 2022	Won	
12	127	Pakistan	Multan Cricket Stadium, Multan	8 June 2022	Lost	
13	115	India	Queen's Park Oval, Port of Spain	24 July 2022	Lost	
14	128* ‡ †	South Africa	Buffalo Park, East London	18 March 2023	Won	
15	132 ‡ †	Nepal	Harare Sports Club, Harare	22 June 2023	Won	
16	109* ‡ †	England	Sir Vivian Richards Stadium, North Sound	3 December 2023	Won	
17	117 ‡	England	Sir Vivian Richards Stadium, North Sound	2 November 2024	Lost	
18	120* ‡ †	Pakistan	Brian Lara Stadium, San Fernando	12 August 2025	Won	
19	109* ‡ †	New Zealand	McLean Park, Napier	19 November 2025	Lost	
20	104 ‡	India	Assam Cricket Association Stadium, Guwahati	30 September 2026	Lost	
21	162* ‡ †	India	Maharaja Yadavindra Singh International Cricket Stadium, Mullanpur	3 October 2026	Won	

=== Twenty20 International centuries ===
List of T20I centuries scored by Shai Hope
No.	Score	Opponent	Venue	Date	Result	Ref
1	102* ‡	Australia	Warner Park, Basseterre	25 July 2025	Lost	
2	102* ‡ †	India	JSCA International Stadium Complex, Ranchi	9 October 2026	Won	
3	102* ‡ †	India	Rajiv Gandhi International Cricket Stadium, Uppal, Hyderabad	14 October 2026	Won	
