= Justin Greaves =

West Indian cricketer

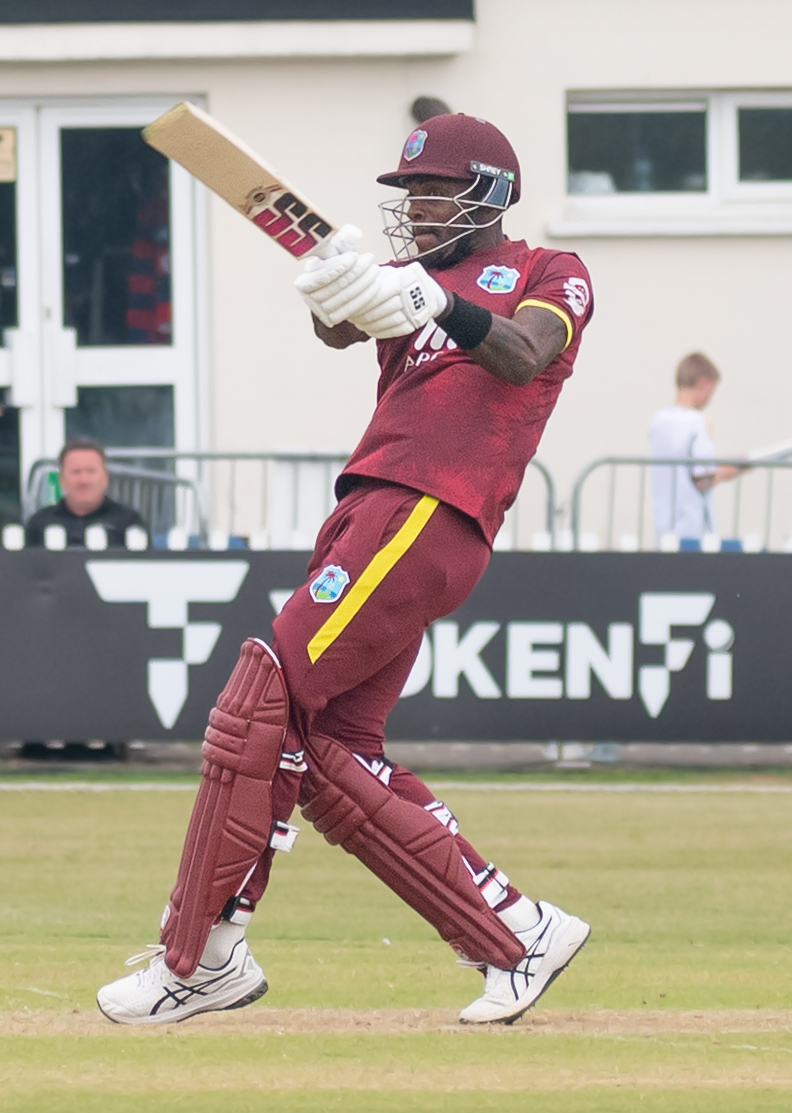
- Greaves batting against Ireland at Clontarf in 2025

Personal information
- Full name: Justin Pierre Greaves
- Born: 26 February 1994 (age 32); Barbados
- Batting: Right-handed
- Bowling: Right-arm medium fast
- Role: All-rounder

International information
- National side: West Indies (2022–present)
- Test debut (cap 335): 17 January 2024 v Australia
- Last Test: 3 July 2026 v Sri Lanka
- ODI debut (cap 208): 8 January 2022 v Ireland
- Last ODI: 27 September 2026 v India
- ODI shirt no.: 66
- T20I debut (cap 99): 19 December 2024 v Bangladesh
- Last T20I: 22 January 2026 v Afghanistan
- T20I shirt no.: 66

Domestic team information
- Years: Team
- 2013/14: Combined Campuses
- 2015/16–2022: Barbados
- 2019–2023: Barbados Royals
- 2022/23: Windward Islands
- 2023/24–: Leeward Islands
- 2024: Antigua & Barbuda Falcons

Career statistics
| Competition | Test | ODI | T20I | FC |
|---|---|---|---|---|
| Matches | 18 | 26 | 2 | 65 |
| Runs scored | 1006 | 607 | 18 | 3,044 |
| Batting average | 33.53 | 31.94 | 9.00 | 32.73 |
| 100s/50s | 3/2 | 1/1 | 0/0 | 7/14 |
| Top score | 202* | 101 | 6 | 202* |
| Balls bowled | 1602 | 456 | 0 | 6,578 |
| Wickets | 31 | 8 | 0 | 117 |
| Bowling average | 29.03 | 63.62 | – | 28.29 |
| 5 wickets in innings | 1 | 0 | 0 | 4 |
| 10 wickets in match | 0 | 0 | 0 | 0 |
| Best bowling | 5/27 | 2/32 | – | 6/34 |
| Catches/stumpings | 20/– | 11/– | 2/– | 49/– |
- Source: Cricinfo, 8 July 2026

Justin Pierre Greaves (born 26 February 1994) is a Barbadian cricketer who has played for both Barbados and the Combined Campuses and Colleges in West Indian domestic cricket. He made his international debut for the West Indies cricket team in January 2022.

== Early life ==
As a teenager, Greaves played cricket for Combermere School, coinciding with Kraigg Brathwaite and Jonathan Drakes.

== Career ==
Greaves played for the West Indies under-19s at the 2012 Under-19 World Cup in Australia. Earlier, in an under-19 series, against Sri Lanka, he had top-scored in a match coming at number seven in the batting order, making 90 runs off just 68 balls.

Greaves played for Sefton Park CC in the Liverpool and District Cricket Competition in England in 2013, scoring 109 and taking 4–32 on debut against Old Xaverians and finishing with 742 runs at 67.45 and 31 wickets at 15.00 in 18 league games as Sefton convincingly won the second division. He returned to England in 2014, assisting Essex side Frinton-on-Sea to a second-placed finish in the Two Counties league to gain promotion to the East Anglian Premier Cricket League.

Greaves made his first-class debut during the 2013–14 Regional Four Day Competition, representing the Combined Campuses. His debut for Barbados came in January 2016, when he played against ICC Americas in the 2015–16 Regional Super50.

In June 2018, he was named in the Cricket West Indies B Team squad for the inaugural edition of the Global T20 Canada tournament. He made his Twenty20 debut on 20 September 2019, for the Barbados Tridents, in the 2019 Caribbean Premier League. The following month, he was named in the West Indies Emerging Team for the 2019–20 Regional Super50 tournament.

In July 2020, he was named in the Barbados Tridents squad for the 2020 Caribbean Premier League.

In November 2021, Greaves was named in the West Indies' One Day International (ODI) squad for their series against Pakistan. In December 2021, he was named in the West Indies' ODI squad for their series against Ireland. He made his ODI debut on 8 January 2022, for the West Indies against Ireland.

In December 2023, he was included in West Indies's Test squad for the away 2-match series against Australia. He made his test debut on 17 January 2024 against Australia. In the first innings of the test, he only scored 5 runs before making 24 in the second innings. In January 2024, he was selected in West Indies's ODI squad for the series against Australia.

Greaves scored his first Test match century against Bangladesh in Antigua on 23 November 2024, making 115 not out in a West Indies first innings total of 450/9 declared.

In December 2024, he was selected in West Indies squad for test match series against Pakistan.

Greaves was named in the West Indies' Test and ODI squad announcements ahead of their 2025–26 tour of New Zealand. He batted in all three of the West Indies' ODI series matches against New Zealand between 16 and 22 November. In the first match Greaves came to the crease with the West Indies trailing by 100 runs with just 67 balls remaining. Greaves finished with 38* runs and hit four boundaries, the second-highest for the team. The West Indies lost by 7 runs. Greaves also batted in their two remaining ODIs, and scored a combined 61 runs across the series. The West Indies lost the series 0–3. In the opening Test against New Zealand, Greaves was bowled out for a duck after facing just three balls. He returned for their second innings with the West Indies trailing by 458 runs and a loss looking almost certain. Facing 388 balls, Greaves hit a Test high score of 202* and achieved his maiden double-century, and ultimately recovered a draw for the West Indies in Christchurch. Across his incredible batting performance against New Zealand, for which he was named Player of the Match, Greaves also delivered a 196-run partnership (with Shai Hope) and a 180*-run partnership (with Kemar Roach) across 10 hours of play. The West Indies also recorded the highest fourth-innings total in five-day Test cricket history, while Greaves became just the seventh player in Test cricket to record a double-century in the fourth innings of a match.

During the 1st Test match against Pakistan on 28 July 2026, Greaves became the 1st bowler in the history of test cricket to bowl 5 consecutive wicket maidens, surpassing Stuart Broad's record of 4 against South Africa in 2016.

== List of International cricket centuries ==
List of Test centuries scored by Justin Greaves
| No. | Score | Opponent | Venue | Date | Result | Refs |
|---|---|---|---|---|---|---|
| 1 | 115* | Bangladesh | Sir Vivian Richards Stadium, Saint George | 22–26 November 2024 | Won | |
| 2 | 202* | New Zealand | Hagley Oval, Christchurch | 2–6 December 2025 | Drawn | |
| 3 | 180 | Sri Lanka | Sir Vivian Richards Stadium, Saint George | 3–7 July 2026 | Drawn | |

List of ODI centuries scored by Justin Greaves
| No. | Score | Opponent | Venue | Date | Result |
|---|---|---|---|---|---|
| 1 | 101 | India | Greenfield International Stadium , Thiruvananthapuram | 27 September 2026 | Lost |
