= Shubman Gill =

Indian cricketer (born 1999)

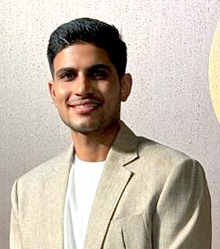

Personal information
- Born: 8 September 1999 (age 27); Fazilka, Punjab, India
- Nickname: Prince
- Batting: Right-handed
- Bowling: Right-arm off break
- Role: Top-order batter

International information
- National side: India (2019–present)
- Test debut (cap 297): 26 December 2020 v Australia
- Last Test: 23 August 2026 v Sri Lanka
- ODI debut (cap 227): 31 January 2019 v New Zealand
- Last ODI: 3 October 2026 v West Indies
- ODI shirt no.: 77
- T20I debut (cap 101): 3 January 2023 v Sri Lanka
- Last T20I: 14 December 2025 v South Africa
- T20I shirt no.: 77

Domestic team information
- Years: Team
- 2017–present: Punjab
- 2018–2021: Kolkata Knight Riders
- 2022: Glamorgan
- 2022–present: Gujarat Titans

Career statistics
Competition	Test	ODI	T20I	FC
Matches	43	70	36	71
Runs scored	3,043	3,713	869	5,677
Batting average	43.47	64.01	28.03	50.68
100s/50s	11/8	11/20	1/3	20/20
Top score	269	223*	126*	269
Catches/stumpings	34/–	41/–	9/–	50/–
Medal record
Men's cricket
Representing India
ICC World Test Championship
Runner-up	2019–2021
Runner-up	2021–2023
ICC Cricket World Cup
Runner-up	2023 India
ICC Champions Trophy
Winner	2025 Pakistan
ACC Asia Cup
Winner	2023 Pakistan
Winner	2025 UAE
ICC U19 World Cup
Winner	2018 New Zealand
ACC U19 Asia Cup
Winner	2016 Sri Lanka
- Source: ESPNcricinfo, 23 June 2026

Shubman Gill (born 8 September 1999) is an Indian international cricketer who plays for the India national team. Gill captains India in Tests and ODIs, the Gujarat Titans in the Indian Premier League and Punjab when he plays first-class cricket. He has also captained India in T20I. A right-handed batsman, Gill represents Punjab in domestic cricket.

In ODI cricket, he is the fastest player to reach 2000 runs, in 38 innings, and 2500 runs, in 50 innings. He also holds the record for the youngest cricketer to score a double century in ODIs at the age of 23. With his country, he won the 2025 ICC Champions Trophy as vice captain. He made his List-A debut against Vidarbha in 2017 and first-class debut for Punjab against Bengal in the 2017–18 Ranji Trophy, scoring a half-century in the game, and 129 runs in the last match against Services.

As vice-captain of the Indian under-19 team, Gill scored 372 runs at an average of 124.00 in the 2018 Under-19 Cricket World Cup, where he played a crucial role in India's fourth title win, earning the edition's Player of the Tournament award. His unbeaten 102 in the semi-final against Pakistan U-19 drew praise from batting greats such as Rahul Dravid, Sachin Tendulkar, VVS Laxman, and Sourav Ganguly.

Shubman Gill was named ICC Men's Player of the Month four times — in January 2023, September 2023, February 2025, and July 2025. He is also the first male player to win the award four times. He was also named in the ICC Men's ODI Team of the Year in 2023. He is one of 2 batters, alongside Rohit Sharma, to have hit more than one ODI double century.

== Early life ==
Gill was born on 8 September 1999 into a Punjabi Sikh family in the village Chak Jaimal Singh Wala of Fazilka district, Punjab, India. His father, Lakhwinder Singh, is a farmer who aspired to become a cricketer. He has an older sister named Shahneel Gill. He showed early promise in cricket, picking up a bat at the age of three. Recognising his interest in the game, Lakhwinder decided to train him, bowling 500 to 700 balls to him daily. In 2007, he moved the family to Mohali, near the Punjab Cricket Association Stadium, to facilitate better training opportunities for Gill.

At the age of twelve, Gill's performance caught the attention of former Indian bowler Karsan Ghavri, who recommended that Gill attend the Under-19 all-India pace bowlers' camp. Gill faced U-19 bowlers in the nets, leading Ghavri to request PCA to put him into Punjab's U-14 team. He is a friend of Abhishek Sharma since childhood and they used to open the innings for Punjab in the under-14s. In an Inter-District Under-16 match against Amritsar, Gill, representing Mohali, scored 351 runs and shared a record opening stand of 587 runs with Nirmal Singh. At the age of 14, he scored a double century on his Under-16 debut for Punjab in the Vijay Merchant Trophy.

== Domestic career ==
Gill made his List A debut for Punjab in the 2016–17 Vijay Hazare Trophy on 25 February 2017 against Vidharbha, during which he scored 11 runs before being run out. In his second match against Assam, he scored his maiden List A century, scoring 121 runs off 129 balls. His first-class debut came against Bengal in the 2017–18 Ranji Trophy on 17 November 2017. Later in the same month, in his second first-class match, he scored his maiden century while batting for Punjab against Services. He scored 129 runs off 142 balls.

In October 2018, Gill was named in India C's squad for the 2018–19 Deodhar Trophy. In the final round-robin match against India A, he scored an unbeaten century, helping send India C through to the final. The following month, he was named as one of the eight players to watch ahead of the 2018–19 Ranji Trophy by ESPNcricinfo. In December 2018, during the match against Tamil Nadu in the Ranji Trophy, Gill scored his maiden double century in first-class cricket, scoring 268 runs. On 25 December 2018, on the fourth day of the match against Hyderabad in the Ranji Trophy, with Punjab needing 338 runs from 57 overs, Gill scored 148 off 154 balls, almost single-handedly taking his team to victory. The match finished as a draw, with Punjab ending the run chase at 324/8 in 57 overs. In the match against Bengal, Gill surpassed 1,000 runs in first-class cricket in his fifteenth innings. He was the leading run-scorer for Punjab in the 2018–19 Ranji Trophy, with 728 runs in five matches.

In August 2019, Gill was named as the captain of the India Blue team for the 2019–20 Duleep Trophy. In October 2019, he was selected as the captain of the India C team for the 2019–20 Deodhar Trophy. In November 2019, he became the youngest cricketer to lead a team in a final of the tournament. He was 20 years and 57 days old, beating Virat Kohli's record, who was 21 years 124 days old during the 2009–10 tournament.

In September 2022, Gill was signed up by Glamorgan as their overseas player for the remainder of the 2022 County Championship season. He debuted at the Sophia ground against Worcestershire.

In August 2025, Gill was selected to lead the North Zone cricket team in 2025–26 Duleep Trophy.

== International career ==
Gill playing a Test match for India against New Zealand in November 2026

In December 2016, Gill was part of the Indian U-19 team for the 2016 ACC Under-19 Asia Cup, where he emerged as the second-highest run-scorer of the tournament, behind teammate Himanshu Rana. India won the tournament by defeating Sri Lanka U-19 in the final, with Gill scoring 70 runs off 92 balls. In February 2017, he played a key role in the team's series win against England U-19. In December 2017, he was named vice captain of India's squad for the 2018 Under-19 Cricket World Cup. In the semifinal against Pakistan U-19, Gill scored 102* runs off 94 balls, earning him the title of Player of the Match. India defeated Australia U-19 in the final, securing their 4th title. He had a successful tournament, leading the team in runs scored with 372 runs and was also named the player of the tournament. Following India's matches in the tournament, the International Cricket Council (ICC) named Gill as the rising star of the squad.

In January 2019, Gill was selected for India's squad for the limited-overs series against New Zealand. On 31 January 2019, he made his One Day International (ODI) debut for India, playing in the fourth ODI match of the series against New Zealand at Seddon Park in Hamilton. In August 2019, Gill set a record as the youngest Indian batsman to score a double century in a first-class match. At the age of 19 years and 334 days, he scored 204 runs for India A against West Indies A at the Brian Lara Cricket Academy in Trinidad and Tobago. The following month, he was selected in India's Test squad for their series against South Africa, but did not play. In December 2019, Gill was named as the captain of India A squad for their tour of New Zealand. In February 2020, he was once again named in India's Test squad, this time for their series against New Zealand.

Gill made his Test debut for India on 26 December 2020 in the 2020 Border–Gavaskar Trophy, contributing to India's comeback win in the second match of the series. In the fourth Test at the Gabba, he scored 91 runs off 146 balls, playing a crucial role in India's series win. In the 2021 England tour of India, Gill scored 119 runs in four matches, including a half-century in the second innings of the first match. India won the 4-match Test series 3–1. Gill was part of the Indian squad for the 2021 ICC World Test Championship final against New Zealand. India lost the match, with Gill scoring 28 runs off 64 balls in the first innings and 8 runs off 33 balls in the second innings. In November 2021, during New Zealand's tour of India, Gill scored 144 runs in the 2-match Test series and was the fourth-highest run-scorer of the series. India won the series 1–0.

In July 2022, during India's tour of West Indies and USA, Gill scored 205 runs in three matches, including a 98 not out in the third ODI. He was the highest run-scorer of the series. India whitewashed West Indies 3-0 and Gill won the Player of the Series award. On 22 August 2022, during the third match of the ODI series against Zimbabwe, Gill scored his first ODI century for the Indian national team. He emerged as the series' top run-scorer and was awarded the Player of the Series award. India clinched the series with a 3–0 victory. During South Africa's tour of India in October 2022, Gill contributed 80 runs across three matches and was the fourth highest run-scorer of the ODI series, helping India secure a 2–1 victory. In November 2022, in the ODI series against New Zealand, Gill was the third highest run-scorer of the series, scoring 108 runs including a half-century in the first match. In December 2022, during the first Test match of the series against Bangladesh, he scored his first Test century, tallying 110 runs.

Gill made his Twenty20 International (T20I) debut on 3 January 2023, against Sri Lanka. He scored seven runs from five balls in that match. In the ODI series, Gill scored 207 runs and was the second highest run-scorer of the series behind Virat Kohli. On 18 January 2023, in the first match of the series against New Zealand, Gill scored a double century, tallying a total of 208 runs. He became the fifth Indian batsman to hit a double century in ODIs, and he is currently the youngest batsman to score a double century in ODIs in men's international cricket. In the third match, Gill scored his maiden T20I century, scoring an unbeaten 126 off 63 balls, and became the 5th Indian batsman to score a century in all formats of international cricket.

On 9 March 2023, Gill scored his second Test century in the fourth match of the 2023 Border-Gavaskar Trophy. India retained the trophy by winning the series 2–1. Gill was part of the Indian squad for the 2023 ICC World Test Championship final against Australia. He scored 13 runs off 15 balls in the first innings and 18 runs off 19 balls in the second innings. India lost the final for the second consecutive time. During the 2023 India tour of West Indies and USA, Gill was the second-highest run-scorer in the ODI series, behind Ishan Kishan.

Gill was selected for the Indian squad in the 2023 Asia Cup. In the match against Bangladesh, he scored his fifth ODI hundred, reaching 121 runs. India won the tournament by defeating Sri Lanka in the final, with Gill emerging as the highest run-scorer of the tournament, tallying 302 runs. In the 2023 Cricket World Cup, Gill missed the first two matches due to suffering from dengue. He returned in the third match against Pakistan. In the match against New Zealand, Gill became the fastest batsman to reach 2000 runs in ODIs, achieving this milestone in 38 innings and surpassing the previous record of 40 innings held by South African batsman Hashim Amla. India lost the final against Australia. Gill scored 354 runs in nine matches.

In May 2024, he was named as a reserve player in India's squad for the 2024 ICC Men's T20 World Cup tournament.

In June 2024, he was named as the captain of India series against Zimbabwe, for five-match series. He captained the Indian Cricket Team for the first time, which India won by 4–1.

In February 2025, at the ICC Champions Trophy, Gill entered the tournament as the highest ranked ODI Batter. He scored an unbeaten 101 to guide India to victory in the first group game against Bangladesh.

In May 2025, following Virat Kohli and Rohit Sharma's retirement from Test cricket, Gill was appointed as Test captain ahead of the five-match series against England, known as the Anderson–Tendulkar Trophy. The BCCI confirmed his appointment during a press conference in Mumbai, highlighting Gill's temperament and long-term potential as a leader in the longest format.

On 20 June 2025, in the first Test at Headingley (Leeds), Gill scored an unbeaten 127 on Day 1, anchoring India's charge to 359/3 at stumps. Despite his century, India eventually lost the match. He became the fifth Indian captain to score a century on Test captaincy debut, joining Vijay Hazare, Sunil Gavaskar, Mohammad Azharuddin, and Virat Kohli, and the fourth to do so in SENA countries, after Hazare, Gavaskar, and Kohli.

On July 2, during the first day of the second Test at Edgbaston, Gill followed up with another unbeaten century—scoring 114* to guide India to 310/5 at stumps. This made him the fourth Indian captain to score back-to-back centuries in his first two matches as captain, after Hazare, Gavaskar, and Kohli. He also became the second Indian captain after Kohli to score consecutive centuries at Edgbaston.

In doing so, Gill became the fourth Indian Test captain to score centuries in three consecutive Tests against England—having previously scored one in Dharamshala during the 2024–25 home series, followed by centuries at Headingley and Edgbaston on the ongoing tour. This marked the fifth such instance overall by an Indian captain, after similar streaks by Mohammad Azharuddin (1984–85), Dilip Vengsarkar (1985–86), and Rahul Dravid (2002 and 2008–11).

Gill completed this innings with a score of 269 runs from 387 balls, registering his maiden Test double century. This marked the highest Test score by an Indian captain, the third-highest away Test score by an Indian batter, and the seventh-highest Test score for India overall. In his second innings of the match, Gill scored another century with 161 runs, giving him an aggregate of 430, the second-highest in a Test behind Graham Gooch. He became the second batter to make two scores above 150 in a Test match, after Allan Border.

Gill was appointed as deputy to Suryakumar Yadav for Asia Cup 2025.

In October 2025, West Indies toured India, as Gill captained his debut home test series. In the second test at Arun Jaitley Cricket Stadium, Delhi, he scored an unbeaten 129, as India declared for 518/5. In doing so, Gill became second-fastest Indian and the third overall to score 5 centuries, after Alastair Cook (9 innings) and Sunil Gavaskar (10). It also become 3rd instance, of an Indian Captain notching up five test centuries in a calendar year, a record previously achieved twice only by Virat Kohli (2017 and 2018). Gill, who has accumulated 2,826 runs in the World Test Championship (WTC), became the highest run-scorer for India in the competition, surpassing Rishabh Pant (2,731), Rohit Sharma (2,716), and Virat Kohli (2,617).

Gill was dropped from India's squad for the 2026 ICC Men's T20 World Cup after having served as the team's vice-captain in the previous Asia Cup.

On 29th July 2026, after having a stellar ODI series against England in England, Shubman Gill dethroned Daryl Mitchell to regain the top spot in the official ICC MEN'S ODI Batting Rankings. This is Gill's third stint as the world's No. 1 ODI batter.

One 30 September, 2026, during the 2nd ODI against the West Indies, Gill hit an unbeaten 223* off 133 balls, hitting 26 fours and 8 sixes. This was his 2nd double century in ODI's, and the highest ever individual score for a captain in ODI's.

== Franchise career ==
=== 2018–2021: Kolkata Knight Riders ===
In January 2018, he was bought by the Kolkata Knight Riders for ₹1.8 crore (US$190,000) in the 2018 IPL auction. He made his Twenty20 debut for Kolkata Knight Riders in the 2018 Indian Premier League on 14 April 2018. Gill scored 203 runs in the 2018 season as KKR finished third, losing in Qualifier 2 against Sunrisers Hyderabad.

In March 2019, he was named as one of eight players to watch by the International Cricket Council (ICC) ahead of the 2019 Indian Premier League tournament. Gill scored 296 runs in the 2019 season as KKR finished fifth. He also won the Emerging Player of the tournament award in the 2019 Indian Premier League.

In 2020, Gill scored 440 runs, making him the highest scoring player for KKR that season. The team would however finish fifth once again.

During the 2021 edition of the IPL, Gill scored 478, being KKR's highest scorer once again. KKR reached the final where Gill would score a half-century, however, the team would ultimately lose to CSK, coming second. After the announcement of two new teams entering the league, each team was allowed to retain up to 4 players but Gill was not retained.

=== 2022–present: Gujarat Titans ===
Ahead of the 2022 IPL auction, Gill was drafted by the newly formed Gujarat Titans franchise for ₹8 crore (equivalent to ₹9.3 crore or US$990,000 in 2026). Gill would score 483 runs in 2022, and the Titans would defeat Rajasthan Royals to win the 2022 IPL in their inaugural year.

In the 2023 season, Gill scored 890 runs, becoming the second highest run scorer ever in a single IPL season and winning the orange cap. In Qualifier 2 versus MI, Gill achieved the season's highest individual score of 129 off 60 balls and the record of highest ever score in an IPL playoffs match and second most centuries in an IPL season at 3. While Gill played in his third consecutive final, the Titans lost to the Chennai Super Kings in 2023. He won MVP (Most Valuable Player) and Gamechanger award the same year.

Following the transfer of Hardik Pandya to Mumbai Indians, Gill was appointed as captain of Gujarat Titans in 2024.

Gill took the Gujarat Titans to the Eliminator in IPL 2025, where they lost to Mumbai Indians by 20 runs.

In IPL 2026, under Shubman Gill's captaincy, Gujarat Titans played their third IPL Final, where they lost to Royal Challengers Bengaluru by six wickets. The match was played at Gujurat's home ground, Narendra Modi Stadium in Ahmedabad.

== International centuries ==
Gill has made 23 international centuries- 11 in Test cricket, 11 in One Day International (ODI) and 1 in Twenty20 international (T20I).

=== Test centuries ===
Runs	Against	Pos.	Inn.	Test	Venue	H/A	Date	Result
110	Bangladesh	1	3	1/2	Zahur Ahmed Chowdhury Stadium, Chattogram	Away	14 December 2022	Won
128	Australia	1	2	4/4	Narendra Modi Stadium, Ahmedabad	Home	9 March 2023	Drawn
104	England	3	2	2/5	ACA-VDCA Cricket Stadium, Vishakapatnam	Home	4 February 2024	Won
110	England	3	2	5/5	HPCA Stadium, Dharamshala	Home	8 March 2024	Won
119*	Bangladesh	3	3	1/2	M. A. Chidambaram Stadium, Chennai	Home	21 September 2024	Won
147	England	4	1	1/5	Headingley Cricket Ground, Leeds	Away	20 June 2025	Lost
269	England	4	1	2/5	Edgbaston Cricket Ground, Birmingham	Away	2 July 2025	Won
161	England	4	3	2/5	Edgbaston Cricket Ground, Birmingham	Away	2 July 2025	Won
103	England	4	3	4/5	Old Trafford Cricket Ground, Manchester	Away	23 July 2025	Drawn
129*	West Indies	4	1	2/2	Arun Jaitley Cricket Stadium, New Delhi	Home	11 October 2025	Won
126	Afghanistan	4	1	1/1	New International Cricket Stadium, Chandigarh	Home	6 June 2026	Won

=== ODI centuries ===
Runs	Against	Pos.	S/R	Venue	H/A/N	Date	Result
130	Zimbabwe	3	134.02	Harare Sports Club, Zimbabwe	Away	22 August 2022	Won
116	Sri Lanka	2	119.58	Greenfield International Stadium, Thiruvananthapuram	Home	15 January 2023	Won
208	New Zealand	2	139.59	Rajiv Gandhi International cricket Stadium, Hyderabad	Home	18 January 2023	Won
112	New Zealand	2	143.58	Holkar Stadium, Indore	Home	24 January 2023	Won
121	Bangladesh	2	90.98	R. Premadasa Stadium, Colombo	Neutral	15 September 2023	Lost
104	Australia	2	107.22	Holkar Stadium, Indore	Home	24 September 2023	Won
112	England	2	109.80	Narendra Modi Stadium, Ahmedabad	Home	12 February 2025	Won
101*	Bangladesh	2	78.29	Dubai International Cricket Stadium, Dubai	Neutral	20 February 2025	Won
154	Afghanistan	3	140.00	Ekana Cricket Stadium, Lucknow	Home	17 June 2026	Won
110	West Indies	2	101.85	Greenfield International Stadium, Thiruvananthapuram	Home	27 September 2026	Won
223*	West Indies	2	167.66	Assam Cricket Association Stadium, Guwahati	Home	30 September 2026	Won

=== T20I centuries ===
Runs	Against	Pos.	S/R	Venue	H/A/N	Date	Result
126*	New Zealand	2	200	Narendra Modi Stadium, Ahmedabad	Home	1 February 2023	Won

== Filmography ==
Year	Title	Role	Notes	Ref.
2023	Spider-Man: Across the Spider-Verse	Pavitr "Pav" Prabhakar / Spider-Man India	Hindi, Punjabi dub; voice role	
