= 2021–22 Logan Cup =

Cricket tournament

- Dates: 15 October 2021 – 21 February 2022
- Administrator(s): Zimbabwe Cricket
- Cricket format: First-class cricket (4 days)
- Tournament format(s): League system
- Champions: Tuskers (5th title)
- Participants: 5
- Matches: 20
- Most runs: Craig Ervine (629)
- Most wickets: Ernest Masuku (38)

The 2021–22 Logan Cup was the 28th edition of the Logan Cup, a first-class cricket competition in Zimbabwe, which started on 15 October 2021. Twenty matches were played, with the tournament concluding on 21 February 2022. The Rocks were the defending champions. Tuskers won the tournament, after their nearest rivals, Mountaineers, were beaten by the Rocks in the final round of matches. Tuskers last won the tournament in the 2014–15 season.

== Points table ==
Team	Pld	W	L	D	A	Pts
Tuskers (Note: Tuskers were docked 2 points for slow over rate.)	8	4	1	3	0	53
Mountaineers	8	4	2	2	0	50
Rocks	8	2	2	4	0	40
Eagles	8	3	4	1	0	35
Rhinos	8	1	5	2	0	20

Champions

10 points for a win, 5 points for a draw, 0 points for a loss

== Fixtures ==
15–18 October 2021
Scorecard

Rocks	v	Eagles
203 (65.2 overs); Tafadzwa Tsiga 67 (113); Brad Evans 4/45 (16 overs)		407 (84.5 overs); Kudzai Maunze 183 (211); Travor Mutsamba 5/81 (18.5 overs)
148 (53 overs); Sikandar Raza 68 (115); Tanaka Chivanga 6/38 (17 overs)

Eagles won by an innings and 56 runs
Takashinga Cricket Club, Harare
Umpires: Forster Mutizwa and Stanley Gogwe

- Rocks won the toss and elected to bat.

15–18 October 2021
Scorecard

Rhinos	v	Mountaineers
290 (83 overs); Takudzwanashe Kaitano 68 (95); Wellington Masakadza 4/73 (29 overs)		159 (50.3 overs); Wellington Masakadza 42 (55); Brandon Mavuta 5/67 (18 overs)
184 (62 overs); Prince Masvaure 40 (72); Brighton Chipungu 5/58 (12 overs)		248 (72 overs); Tony Munyonga 90 (157); Ryan Burl 4/82 (23 overs)

Rhinos won by 67 runs
Harare Sports Club, Harare
Umpires: Iknow Chabi and Percival Sizara

- Mountaineers won the toss and elected to field.

21–24 October 2021
Scorecard

Rhinos	v	Eagles
282 (87.2 overs); Charles Kunje 73 (160); Tapiwa Mufudza 3/48 (24 overs)		315 (75.2 overs); Wesley Madhevere 111 (151); Johnathan Campbell 3/64 (18 overs)
308 (107.1 overs); Prince Masvaure 97 (258); Tanaka Chivanga 4/69 (16 overs)		278/5 (50.3 overs); Regis Chakabva 99 (101); Brandon Mavuta 2/100 (19 overs)

Eagles won by 5 wickets
Harare Sports Club, Harare
Umpires: Iknow Chabi and Percival Sizara

- Eagles won the toss and elected to field.

21–24 October 2021
Scorecard

Rocks	v	Tuskers
355 (98.5 overs); Richmond Mutumbami 156 (196); Ernest Masuku 6/91 (23 overs)		281 (92.1 overs); Steve Chimhamhiwa 57* (91); Sikandar Raza 4/75 (27.1 overs)
277/8d (74 overs); Cephas Zhuwao 65 (55); Ainsley Ndlovu 4/53 (27 overs)		248/4 (65 overs); Tanunurwa Makoni 129 (166); Sikandar Raza 2/56 (19 overs)

Match drawn
Takashinga Cricket Club, Harare
Umpires: David Shawane and Forster Mutizwa

- Tuskers won the toss and elected to field.
- George Matanga (Rocks) made his first-class debut.

27–30 October 2021
Scorecard

Mountaineers	v	Eagles
330 (114.4 overs); Donald Tiripano 116 (265); Keith Jaure 3/41 (21 overs)		208 (74.3 overs); Chamu Chibhabha 62 (129); Wellington Masakadza 4/57 (22.3 overs)
149 (58.1 overs); Donald Tiripano 33 (90); Tapiwa Mufudza 5/66 (21.1 overs)		151 (45.4 overs); Wesley Madhevere 39 (56); Wellington Masakadza 6/41 (13.4 overs)

Mountaineers won by 120 runs
Harare Sports Club, Harare
Umpires: Oscar Tafirenyika and Stanley Gogwe

- Eagles won the toss and elected to field.
- Brighton Zhawi (Eagles) made his first-class debut.

27–30 October 2021
Scorecard

Rhinos	v	Tuskers
229 (73 overs); Prince Masvaure 51 (105); Ainsley Ndlovu 3/48 (15 overs)		363 (90.1 overs); Milton Shumba 90 (146); Johnathan Campbell 3/65 (16 overs)
342 (102 overs); Takudzwanashe Kaitano 105 (213); Ainsley Ndlovu 4/73 (29 overs)		210/5 (58.1 overs); Craig Ervine 53 (104); Charles Kunje 2/13 (3 overs)

Tuskers won by 5 wickets
Takashinga Cricket Club, Harare
Umpires: David Shawane and Walter Musakwa

- Rhinos won the toss and elected to bat.

3–6 November 2021
Scorecard

Eagles	v	Tuskers
329 (92.2 overs); Tinotenda Mutombodzi 122 (157); Ernest Masuku 5/62 (14 overs)		439 (146.2 overs); Craig Ervine 183 (397); Tanaka Chivanga 5/81 (18.2 overs)
239 (68.5 overs); Chamu Chibhabha 82 (157); Luke Jongwe 4/24 (8.5 overs)		131/3 (32.4 overs); Craig Ervine 55* (85); Tapiwa Mufudza 2/34 (11 overs)

Tuskers won by 7 wickets
Takashinga Cricket Club, Harare
Umpires: Stanley Gogwe and Walter Musakwa

- Tuskers won the toss and elected to field.
- Takudzwa Takodza (Eagles) made his first-class debut.

3–6 November 2021
Scorecard

Mountaineers	v	Rocks
258 (81.2 overs); Tendai Chatara 68 (76); Tendai Chisoro 4/65 (20.2 overs)		505/8d (149.3 overs); Sikandar Raza 226 (299); Vincent Masekesa 4/115 (17 overs)
320/5 (94 overs); Peter Moor 81 (118); Travor Mutsamba 2/31 (16 overs)

Match drawn
Old Hararians, Harare
Umpires: David Shawane and Sifelani Rwaziyeni

- Mountaineers won the toss and elected to bat.

17–20 January 2022
Scorecard

Tuskers	v	Mountaineers
224 (63.4 overs); Ainsley Ndlovu 62 (54); Victor Nyauchi 5/36 (19 overs)		306 (100.1 overs); Ben Compton 79 (114); Ainsley Ndlovu 4/81 (36 overs)
172 (66.4 overs); Karabo Motlhanka 41 (135); Victor Nyauchi 6/27 (17.4 overs)		91/2 (26 overs); Ben Compton 41* (69); Steve Chimhamhiwa 1/13 (6 overs)

Mountaineers won by 8 wickets
Harare Sports Club, Harare
Umpires: Forster Mutizwa and Stanley Gogwe

- Mountaineers won the toss and elected to field.
- Karabo Motlhanka (Tuskers) made his first-class debut.

17–20 January 2022
Scorecard

Rhinos	v	Rocks
324 (91.3 overs); Remembrance Nyathi 131 (182); Innocent Kaia 4/44 (13.3 overs)		201 (66.1 overs); Richmond Mutumbami 33 (61); Brandon Mavuta 6/67 (25.1 overs)
312/7d (97.5 overs); Remembrance Nyathi 110* (211); William Mashinge 3/41 (14 overs)		253/6 (98 overs); Richmond Mutumbami 88 (150); Carl Mumba 2/33 (15 overs)

Match drawn
Old Hararians, Harare
Umpires: Christopher Phiri and Sifelani Rwaziyeni

- Rocks won the toss and elected to field.
- Nqobile Sibanda (Rhinos) made his first-class debut.
- Prince Masvaure (Rhinos) played in his 100th first-class match.

23–26 January 2022
Scorecard

Tuskers	v	Eagles
281 (93.3 overs); Taffy Mupariwa 78 (212); Tanaka Chivanga 5/57 (19.3 overs)		289 (80.4 overs); Shoun Handirisi 93 (151); Nick Gubbins 4/41 (14.4 overs)
3/0 (1 over); Tanunurwa Makoni 3* (1 over)

Match drawn
Old Hararians, Harare
Umpires: Iknow Chabi and Tafadzwa Musakwa

- Tuskers won the toss and elected to bat.
- No play was possible on days 3 and 4 due to rain.

25–28 January 2022
Scorecard

Rocks	v	Rhinos
309/9 (97 overs); Richmond Mutumbami 115 (197); Carl Mumba 3/58 (14 overs)

Match drawn
Harare Sports Club, Harare
Umpires: Langton Rusere and Percival Sizara

- Rocks won the toss and elected to bat.
- No play was possible on days 1, 2 and 4 due to rain.
- Priviledge Chesa (Rocks) made his first-class debut.

31 January – 3 February 2022
Scorecard

Tuskers	v	Mountaineers
125 (45.1 overs); Tanunurwa Makoni 34 (72); Tendai Chatara 5/41 (18.1 overs)		184 (67.1 overs); Joylord Gumbie 63 (101); Ernest Masuku 5/52 (19 overs)
397 (116.1 overs); Nick Gubbins 174 (221); Tony Munyonga 4/90 (24 overs)		171/4 (97.3 overs); Ben Compton 109* (287); Ernest Masuku 2/49 (22 overs)

Match drawn
Harare Sports Club, Harare
Umpires: Forster Mutizwa and Percival Sizara

- Mountaineers won the toss and elected to field.
- Ben Compton (Mountaineers) scored his maiden century in first-class cricket.

31 January – 3 February 2022
Scorecard

Rocks	v	Eagles
512/8d (173.2 overs); Tadiwanashe Marumani 102 (361); Marshal Takodza 2/25 (8.2 overs)		166 (53.5 overs); Will Fraine 45 (127); Tendai Chisoro 3/60 (6.5 overs)
		229 (82.5 overs) (f/o); Will Fraine 88 (179); Tendai Chisoro 5/35 (11.5 overs)

Rocks won by an innings and 117 runs
Old Hararians, Harare
Umpires: Iknow Chabi and Sifelani Rwaziyeni

- Rocks won the toss and elected to bat.
- Daniel Jakiel (Eagles) made his first-class debut.
- Tadiwanashe Marumani (Rocks) scored his maiden century in first-class cricket.

6–9 February 2022
Scorecard

Eagles	v	Mountaineers
181 (56.5 overs); Wessley Madhevere 72 (124); Wellington Masakadza 4/31 (15.5 overs)		328 (99.1 overs); Ben Compton 102 (194); Wessley Madhevere 7/105 (30 overs)
165 (61.4 overs); Tinotenda Mutombodzi 38 (68); Wellington Masakadza 4/21 (14.4 overs)		19/0 (3.2 overs); Ben Compton 13* (13)

Mountaineers won by 10 wickets
Old Hararians, Harare
Umpires: Forster Mutizwa and Stanley Gogwe

- Mountaineers won the toss and elected to field.

6–9 February 2022
Scorecard

Tuskers	v	Rhinos
347 (87.2 overs); Clive Madande 93 (102); Carl Mumba 5/72 (18 overs)		245 (95 overs); Charles Kunje 88 (205); Ernest Masuku 3/40 (18 overs)
292/5d (66.5 overs); Craig Ervine 107 (142); Brandon Mavuta 2/102 (20 overs)		366 (99.2 overs); Prince Masvaure 103 (218); Ainsley Ndlovu 5/71 (24.2 overs)

Tuskers won by 28 runs
Harare Sports Club, Harare
Umpires: Christopher Phiri and Tafadzwa Musakwa

- Tuskers won the toss and elected to bat.

12–15 February 2022
Scorecard

Rhinos	v	Mountaineers
184 (49.4 overs); Takudzwanashe Kaitano 109 (132); Victor Nyauchi 5/48 (15.4 overs)		323 (100 overs); Wellington Masakadza 84 (116); Michael Chinouya 3/49 (22 overs)
238 (83.2 overs); Johnathan Campbell 68 (105); Victor Nyauchi 4/41 (19.2 overs)		102/0 (14.4 overs); Kevin Kasuza 59* (54)

Mountaineers won by 10 wickets
Harare Sports Club, Harare
Umpires: Iknow Chabi and Stanley Gogwe

- Mountaineers won the toss and elected to field.

12–15 February 2022
Scorecard

Rocks	v	Tuskers
245 (94.4 overs); Innocent Kaia 59 (112); Steve Chimhamhiwa 5/40 (17 overs)		183 (52.1 overs); Clive Madande 45 (73); Nkosilathi Nungu 4/61 (14 overs)
225 (65.5 overs); Innocent Kaia 86 (121); John Nyumbu 3/41 (12 overs)		290/4 (88.1 overs); Craig Ervine 123* (251); Travor Mutsamba 2/30 (15 overs)

Tuskers won by 6 wickets
Old Hararians, Harare
Umpires: Forster Mutizwa and Walter Musakwa

- Rocks won the toss and elected to bat.
- Nkosilathi Nungu (Rocks) made his first-class debut.

18–21 February 2022
Scorecard

Rocks	v	Mountaineers
477 (157.1 overs); Cephas Zhuwao 152 (168); Wellington Masakadza 4/92 (49 overs)		265 (81.2 overs); Tony Munyonga 95 (149); Cuthbert Musoko 5/15 (14.2 overs)
61/3 (10.4 overs); Innocent Kaia 24 (22); Wellington Masakadza 1/13 (1.4 overs)		269 (77.3 overs) (f/o); Timycen Maruma 67 (106); Travor Mutsamba 4/65 (20 overs)

Rocks won by 7 wickets
Harare Sports Club, Harare
Umpires: Forster Mutizwa and Iknow Chabi

- Rocks won the toss and elected to bat.

18–21 February 2022
Scorecard

Eagles	v	Rhinos
169 (56.5 overs); Kudzai Maunze 57 (112); Ronald Masocha 5/28 (11 overs)		162 (58 overs); Prince Masvaure 48 (96); Wessley Madhevere 3/26 (15 overs)
231 (72.5 overs); Will Fraine 85 (209); Michael Chinouya 4/48 (15 overs)		81 (26.3 overs); Ryan Burl 19 (43); Brad Evans 3/25 (5.3 overs)

Eagles won by 157 runs
Old Hararians, Harare
Umpires: Percival Sizara and Sifelani Rwaziyeni

- Rhinos won the toss and elected to field.
- Ronald Masocha (Rhinos), Kumbirayi Phiri and Wishnanzy Chapfombo (Eagles) all made their first-class debuts.

== Statistics ==
=== Most Runs ===
Player	Team	Mat	Inns	Runs	Ave	SR	HS	100	50	4s	6s
Craig Ervine	Matabeleland Tuskers	5	10	629	78.62	55.46	183	3	2	66	3
Kudzai Maunze	Mashonaland Eagles	8	14	530	37.85	66.41	183	1	3	69	7
Richmond Mutumbami	Southern Rocks	7	10	522	52.20	60.55	156	2	1	71	8
Takudzwanashe Kaitano	Mid West Rhinos	6	12	488	40.66	61.92	109	2	3	80	2
Tanunurwa Makoni	Matabeleland Tuskers	8	16	487	32.46	50.41	129	1	2	73	3
Source: ESPNCricInfo

=== Most Wickets ===
Player	Team	Mat	Inns	Wkts	BBI	Avg	Econ	SR	5w	10w
Ernest Masuku	Matabeleland Tuskers	8	15	38	6/91	23.44	3.44	40.8	3	0
Brandon Mavuta	Mid West Rhinos	8	15	36	6/67	34.97	3.89	53.8	2	0
Wellington Masakadza	Mountaineers	7	13	35	6/41	20.02	2.60	46.2	1	1
Victor Nyauchi	Mountaineers	7	13	32	6/27	16.43	2.54	38.7	3	1
Ainsley Ndlovu	Matabeleland Tuskers	8	15	29	5/71	29.34	2.57	68.3	1	0
Source: ESPNCricInfo
