= 2021–22 Pro50 Championship =

Cricket tournament

- Dates: 11 November 2021 – 13 March 2022
- Administrator(s): Zimbabwe Cricket
- Cricket format: List A cricket
- Tournament format(s): Double round-robin and Final
- Champions: Mountaineers (3rd title)
- Participants: 5
- Matches: 21
- Most runs: Ben Compton (361)
- Most wickets: Sean Williams (15)

The 2021–22 Pro50 Championship was the twentieth edition of the Pro50 Championship, a List A cricket tournament that was played in Zimbabwe. It started on 11 November 2021, with five teams taking part. Rhinos were the defending champions.

The match between Eagles and Mountaineers, scheduled to be played on 9 December 2021, was postponed after four players tested positive for COVID-19. Mountaineers won their penultimate group match, to join Rocks in the final of the tournament. In the final, Mountaineers beat Rocks by 71 runs to win the tournament.

== Points table ==
Pos	Team	Pld	W	L	NR	Pts	NRR
1	Rocks	8	6	1	1	64	−0.041
2	Mountaineers	8	5	2	1	55	1.646
3	Eagles	8	3	3	2	40	0.520
4	Tuskers	8	3	5	0	30	−0.394
5	Rhinos	8	1	7	0	7	−1.329

Source: Cricinfo

Advanced to the Final

== Fixtures ==
=== Round-robin ===
11 November 2021
Scorecard

Tuskers; 106 (32.2 overs)	v	Eagles; 107/2 (17.5 overs)
Brian Chari 31 (28); Richard Ngarava 3/14 (6.2 overs)		Chamu Chibhabha 43* (49); Charlton Tshuma 1/28 (6 overs)

Eagles won by 8 wickets
Mutare Sports Club, Mutare
Umpires: Collin Tlou and Sifelani Rwaziyeni
Player of the match: Richard Ngarava (Eagles)

- Eagles won the toss and elected to field.

11 November 2021
Scorecard

Rocks; 214 (45.3 overs)	v	Rhinos; 127/5 (31.1 overs)
Tadiwanashe Marumani 65 (70); Brandon Mavuta 3/24 (10 overs)		Takudzwanashe Kaitano 46 (52); Travor Mutsamba 1/19 (5 overs)

Rocks won by 10 runs (DLS method)
Kwekwe Sports Club, Kwekwe
Umpires: David Shawane and Oscar Tafirenyika

- Rhinos won the toss and elected to field.
- Rhinos were set a revised target of 138 runs from 31.1 overs due to rain.

13 November 2021
Scorecard

Eagles; 314 (48.5 overs)	v	Tuskers; 315/6 (47.5 overs)
Regis Chakabva 122 (97); Ernest Masuku 6/50 (9.5 overs)		Craig Ervine 118 (100); Wesley Madhevere 2/40 (10 overs)

Matabeleland Tuskers won by 4 wickets
Bulawayo Athletic Club, Bulawayo
Umpires: Collin Tlou and Sifelani Rwaziyeni
Player of the match: Craig Ervine (Tuskers)

- Tuskers won the toss and elected to field.

13 November 2021
Scorecard

Rocks; 248/8 (50 overs)	v	Rhinos; 94/3 (24 overs)
Sikandar Raza 60* (95); Carl Mumba 4/55 (7 overs)		Takudzwanashe Kaitano 46* (76); William Mashinge 1/22 (4 overs)

Rocks won by 14 runs (DLS method)
Kwekwe Sports Club, Kwekwe
Umpires: David Shawane and Oscar Tafirenyika

- Rocks won the toss and elected to bat.
- Rhinos were set a revised target of 109 runs from 24 overs due to rain.

17 November 2021
Scorecard

Rocks; 185 (42 overs)	v	Tuskers; 115 (28.2 overs)
Cephas Zhuwao 42 (35); Milton Shumba 3/18 (8 overs)		Taffy Mupariwa 28 (55); Blessing Muzarabani 3/18 (6.2 overs)

Southern Rocks won by 29 runs (DLS method)
Masvingo Sports Club, Masvingo
Umpires: Ashby Mutumbami and Tafadzwa Musakwa

- Tuskers won the toss and elected to field.
- Tuskers were set a revised target of 145 runs from 31 overs due to rain.

17 November 2021
Scorecard

Mountaineers; 363/9 (50 overs)	v	Rhinos; 177 (41.1 overs)
Ben Compton 102 (122); Tashinga Musekiwa 5/68 (8 overs)		Prince Masvaure 33 (42); John Masara 4/41 (10 overs)

Mountaineers won by 186 runs
Mutare Sports Club, Mutare
Umpires: David Shawane and Percival Sizara

- Rhinos won the toss and elected to field.
- Ben Compton (Mountaineers) scored his first century in List A cricket.

19 November 2021
Scorecard

Rocks; 151 (38.2 overs)	v	Tuskers; 142 (30.2 overs)
Ben Curran 47 (62); Sean Williams 3/21 (10 overs)		Sean Williams 86 (74); Sikandar Raza 3/49 (10 overs)

Rocks won by 9 runs
Masvingo Sports Club, Masvingo
Umpires: Bothwell Mandiya and Tafadzwa Musakwa

- Tuskers won the toss and elected to field.

19 November 2021
Scorecard

Mountaineers; 293/9 (50 overs)	v	Rhinos; 177 (38.1 overs)
Tony Munyonga 95 (87); Carl Mumba 3/32 (10 overs)		Tashinga Musekiwa 73* (72); Tendai Chatara 4/43 (10 overs)

Mountaineers won by 116 runs
Mutare Sports Club, Mutare
Umpires: David Shawane and Percival Sizara

- Rhinos won the toss and elected to field.

23 November 2021
Scorecard

Rocks	v	Eagles

Match abandoned
Masvingo Sports Club, Masvingo
Umpires: Ashby Mutumbami and Sifelani Rwaziyeni

- No toss.
- No play was possible due to rain.

23 November 2021
Scorecard

Tuskers; 194 (50 overs)	v	Mountaineers; 198/6 (37.1 overs)
Taffy Mupariwa 59* (105); Tendai Chatara 4/40 (9 overs)		Peter Moor 49 (54); Sean Williams 2/40 (10 overs)

Mountaineers won by 4 wickets
Queens Sports Club, Bulawayo
Umpires: Nkosehle Ndiweni and Percival Sizara

- Mountaineers won the toss and elected to field.

25 November 2021
Scorecard

Eagles; 163 (35.2 overs)	v	Rocks; 164/7 (42.2 overs)
Wesley Madhevere 53 (74); Travor Mutsamba 5/29 (8 overs)		Sikandar Raza 56* (92); Richard Ngarava 2/22 (9 overs)

Rocks won by 3 wickets
Masvingo Sports Club, Masvingo

- Eagles won the toss and elected to bat.

25 November 2021
Scorecard

Tuskers; 206 (45 overs)	v	Mountaineers; 197 (43.5 overs)
Sean Williams 56 (58); Victor Nyauchi 4/48 (10 overs)		Kevin Kasuza 74 (88); Sean Williams 5/34 (9.5 overs)

Tuskers won by 9 runs
Queens Sports Club, Bulawayo

- Tuskers won the toss and elected to bat.

5 December 2021
Scorecard

Rhinos; 261 (47.4 overs)	v	Eagles; 266/4 (42.1 overs)
Takudzwanashe Kaitano 73 (72); Tapiwa Mufudza 3/38 (9.4 overs)		Marshal Takodza 76* (71); Brandon Mavuta 3/62 (10 overs)

Eagles won by 6 wickets
Harare Sports Club, Harare
Umpires: Forster Mutizwa and Langton Rusere

- Rhinos won the toss and elected to bat.

5 December 2021
Scorecard

Rocks; 306/6 (50 overs)	v	Mountaineers; 296 (49.4 overs)
Ben Curran 88 (96); John Masara 2/39 (7 overs)		Shingirai Masakadza 59 (28); Sikandar Raza 2/50 (10 overs)

Rocks won by 10 runs
Takashinga Cricket Club, Mutare
Umpires: Christopher Phiri and Iknow Chabi

- Mountaineers won the toss and elected to field.
- Gabriel Jaya (Rocks) made his List A debut.

7 December 2021
Scorecard

Eagles; 261 (46.4 overs)	v	Rhinos; 236/8 (50 overs)
Kudzai Maunze 87 (71); Manson Chikowero 3/34 (6.4 overs)		Nyasha Mayavo 86* (90); Tapiwa Mufudza 3/46 (10 overs)

Eagles won by 26 runs
Takashinga Cricket Club, Mutare
Umpires: Langton Rusere and Stanley Gogwe

- Rhinos won the toss and elected to field.

7 December 2021
Scorecard

Rocks; 131 (37 overs)	v	Mountaineers; 132/2 (22.1 overs)
William Mashinge 41* (61); Tendai Chatara 3/43 (8 overs)		Ben Compton 45 (52); Sikandar Raza 1/12 (3 overs)

Mountaineers won by 8 wickets
Harare Sports Club, Mutare
Umpires: Iknow Chabi and Sifelani Rwaziyeni

- Rocks won the toss and elected to bat.

9 December 2021
Scorecard

Tuskers; 193 (42.4 overs)	v	Rhinos; 194/6 (42.2 overs)
Craig Ervine 99* (101); Ryan Burl 2/15 (3.4 overs)		Johnathan Campbell 55 (62); Ainsley Ndlovu 2/31 (9 overs)

Rhinos won by 4 wickets
Old Hararians, Harare
Umpires: Forster Mutizwa and Tafadzwa Musakwa

- Rhinos won the toss and elected to field.

11 December 2021
Scorecard

Tuskers; 240/9 (50 overs)	v	Rhinos; 134 (32.1 overs)
Clive Madande 75 (87); Carl Mumba 3/39 (9 overs)		Prince Masvaure 35 (62); Ainsley Ndlovu 3/13 (4 overs)

Matabeleland Tuskers won by 106 runs
Harare Sports Club, Harare
Umpires: Iknow Chabi and Sifelani Rwaziyeni

- Tuskers won the toss and elected to bat.

12 January 2022
Scorecard

Mountaineers; 227 (39.3 overs)	v	Eagles; 187 (37.1 overs)
Ben Compton 110 (109); Daniel Jakiel 2/42 (7.3 overs)		Tinashe Kamunhukamwe 39 (52); Victor Nyauchi 3/21 (6 overs)

Mountaineers won by 40 runs
Harare Sports Club, Harare
Umpires: Langton Rusere and Sifelani Rwaziyeni

- Eagles won the toss and elected to field.

14 January 2022
Scorecard

Eagles; 193/4 (36.1 overs)	v	Mountaineers
Kudzai Maunze 74 (80); Brighton Chipungu 2/51 (10 overs)

No result
Harare Sports Club, Harare
Umpires: David Shawane and Forster Mutizwa

- Eagles won the toss and elected to bat.
- No further play was possible due to rain.
- Frank Mwazviita (Mountaineers) made his List A debut.

=== Final ===
13 March 2022
Scorecard

Mountaineers; 307/9 (50 overs)	v	Rocks; 236 (45.5 overs)
Peter Moor 76 (58); Dylan Hondo 4/25 (10 overs)		Innocent Kaia 82 (105); John Masara 4/43 (10 overs)

Mountaineers won by 71 runs
Harare Sports Club, Harare
Umpires: Forster Mutizwa and Iknow Chabi
Player of the match: Wellington Masakadza (Mountaineers)

- Mountaineers won the toss and elected to bat.
