= 2023–24 Pro50 Championship =

Cricket tournament

- Dates: 20 October 2023 – 2 December 2023
- Administrator: Zimbabwe Cricket
- Cricket format: List A cricket
- Tournament format(s): Double round-robin and Final
- Champions: Mashonaland Eagles (6th title)
- Participants: 5
- Matches: 21
- Most runs: Antum Naqvi (514)
- Most wickets: Tapiwa Mufudza (18)

The 2023–24 Pro50 Championship was the 21st edition of the Pro50 Championship, a List A cricket tournament that was played in Zimbabwe. It started on 20 October 2023 and the final game was played on 2 December 2023. The Mountaineers were the defending champions.

Games took place at various grounds such as the Takashinga Cricket Club, Mutare Sports Club, Queens Sports Club, Kwekwe Sports Club, Harare Sports Club and Masvingo Sports Club. The teams Eagles, Tuskers, Rhinos, Mountaineers and Southern Rocks played each other in a double round-robin group stage format, following which the top two (2) teams in the points table will competed in the final on 2 December 2023.

The Mashonaland Eagles won the tournament after only losing 1 game out of 9. They defeated the Mid West Rhinos in the final. Antum Naqvi was named the batter and player of the Pro50 Championship, while Tapiwa Mufudza was named bowler of the tournament.

Following the Zim Afro T10, Zimbabwe Cricket and the Lahore Qalandars parent of Durban Qalandars signed an MoU to send five Pakistani fast bowlers from the local Qalandars High Performance Center in the Zimbabwe domestic series. Five players namely: Mohammad Adil, Mamoon Riaz, Ameer Hamza, Jalat Khan and Salman Mirza; were sent to Zimbabwe as part of this camp. Four out of the five players were in the squads in the remaining four games on November 24 and 26, many of whom made their List A debut.

Venues that held at least one game.

== Points table ==
Pos	Team	Pld	W	L	NR	Pts	NRR
1	Eagles	8	7	1	0	14	0.687
2	Rhinos	8	5	3	0	10	0.376
3	Rocks	8	4	4	0	8	0.370
4	Mountaineers	8	3	5	0	6	−0.895
5	Tuskers	8	1	7	0	2	−0.568

Source: ESPNCricInfo

Advanced to the Final

=== Match summary ===
The total team points at the end of each round are listed.

Team	Round										Total
Team	1	2	3	4	5	6	7	8	9	10	Total
Mashonaland Eagles	2	4	6	8	10	12	14	14	14	14	14
Mid West Rhinos	2	4	4	4	6	6	6	8	8	10	10
Southern Rocks	0	0	2	2	2	2	4	6	8	8	8
Mountaineers	0	0	0	2	2	2	2	2	4	6	6
Matabeleland Tuskers	0	0	0	0	0	2	2	2	2	2	2

Win	Loss	Bye

== Fixtures ==
20 October 2023
09:30
Scorecard

Eagles; 255/10 (47.5 overs)	v	Rocks; 249 (44.3 overs)
Kudzai Maunze 65 (82); Kudakwashe Macheka 4/36 (8.4 overs)		Keith Jaure 43 (39); Tanaka Chivanga 3/28 (8.3 overs)

Eagles won by 6 runs
Takashinga Cricket Club, Harare
Umpires: Christopher Phiri and Iknow Chabi

- Southern Rocks elected to field first.
- Romario Roach (Eagles) made his List A debut.
- Points: Mashonaland Eagles 2, Southern Rocks 0

20 October 2023
09:30
Scorecard

Mountaineers; 295/7 (50 overs)	v	Rhinos; 296/6 (49 overs)
Tony Munyonga 96 (86); Carl Mumba 2/32 (7 overs)		Tarisai Musakanda 83* (75); Tendai Chatara 2/60 (10 overs)

Rhinos won by 4 wickets
Mutare Sports Club, Mutare
Umpires: Forster Mutizwa and Langton Rusere

- Mountaineers elected to bat first.
- Antum Naqvi (Rhinos) made his List A debut.
- Points: Mid West Rhinos 2, Mountaineers 0

22 October 2023
09:30
Scorecard

Rocks; 270 (49 overs)	v	Eagles; 273/7 (49.2 overs)
Tendai Chisoro 71 (80); Tapiwa Mufudza 3/46 (10 overs)		Chamu Chibhabha 64* (66); Trevor Gwandu 4/44 (8.2 overs)

Eagles won by 3 wickers
Takashinga Cricket Club, Harare
Umpires: Tafadzwa Musakwa and Christopher Phiri

- Mashonaland Eagles elected to field first
- Jayden Schadendorf (Rocks), Owen Muzondo (Eagles) & Matthew Wlech (Eagles) made their List A debut.
- Points: Mashonaland Eagles 2, Southern Rocks 0

22 October 2023
09:30
Scorecard

Mountaineers; 295 (49.3 overs)	v	Rhinos; 298/2 (39 overs)
Spencer Magodo 75 (74); Brandon Mavuta 3/44 (10 overs)		Antum Naqvi 128* (93); Donald Tiripano 1/23 (7 overs)

Rhinos won by 8 wickets
Mutare Sports Club, Mutare
Umpires: Forster Mutizwa and Ashby Mutumbami

- Rhinos won the toss and elected to field.
- Ben Curran, Patrick Row (Rhinos) and Mashford Shungu (Mountaineers) all made their List A debuts.
- Points: Mid West Rhinos 2, Mountaineers 0

27 October 2023
09:30
Scorecard

Tuskers; 178 (46 overs)	v	Eagles; 179/9 (46.2 overs)
Milton Shumba 54* (73); Alex Russell 3/15 (10 overs)		Rodney Mupfudza 54 (80); Brandon James 3/19 (5 overs)

Eagles won by 1 wicket
Harare Sports Club, Harare
Umpires: Forster Mutizwa and Stanley Gogwe

- Matabeleland Tuskers elected to bat first.
- Brandon James (Tuskers) made his List A debut.
- Points: Mashonaland Eagles 2, Matabeleland Tuskers 0

27 October 2023
09:30
Scorecard

Mountaineers; 121 (24.2 overs)	v	Rocks; 122/5 (22 overs)
Peter Moor 29 (29); Trevor Gwandu 3/28 (7.2 overs)		Tafadzwa Tsiga 32* (42); Tinashe Muchawaya 4/42 (8 overs)

Rocks won by 5 wickets.
Masvingo Sports Club, Masvingo
Umpires: Christopher Phiri and Iknow Chabi

- Southern Rocks elected to field first.
- Brian Bennet & Prosper Mugeri (Mountaineers) made their List A debut.
- Points: Southern Rocks 2, Mountaineers 0

29 October 2023
09:30
Scorecard

Tuskers; 198 (42.5 overs)	v	Eagles; 201/5 (45.1 overs)
Sean Williams 45 (48); Kudzai Maunze 3/1 (0.5 overs)		Kudzai Maunze 45 (48); Nkosana Mpofu 1/20 (6 overs)

Eagles won by 5 wickets
Harare Sports Club, Harare
Umpires: David Shawane and Forster Mutizwa

- Matabeleland Tuskers elected to bat first.
- Adrian Mupembe (Tuskers) made their List A debut.
- Points: Mashonaland Eagles 2, Matabeleland Tuskers 0

29 October 2023
09:30
Scorecard

Rocks; 315/5 (50 overs)	v	Mountaineers; 318/3 (46.2 overs)
Roy Kaia 97 (118); Donald Tiripano 2/58 (9 overs)		PJ Moor 96* (65); Takudzwa Chataira 1/67 (9 overs)

Mountaineers won by 7 wickets
Masvingo Sports Club, Masvingo
Umpires: Christopher Phiri and Iknow Chabi

- Mountaineers elected to field first
- Points: Mountaineers 2, Southern Rocks 0

3 November 2023
09:30
Scorecard

Mountaineers; 205 (43.1 overs)	v	Eagles; 206/5 (36.3 overs)
PJ Moor 79 (66); Tapiwa Mufudza 3/55 (10 overs)		Nick Welch 59 (43); Prosper Mugeri 2/18 (5 overs)

Eagles won by 5 wickets
Mutare Sports Club, Mutare
Umpires: Forster Mutizwa and Iknow Chabi

- Mashonaland Eagles elected to field first
- Points: Mashonaland Eagles 2, Mountaineers 0

3 November 2023
09:30
Scorecard

Tuskers; 237 (49.1 overs)	v	Rhinos; 238/4 (42.3 overs)
Luke Jongwe 55 (68); Carl Mumba 3/53 (9 overs)		Prince Masvaure 73 (89); Christopher Mpofu 2/31 (7 overs)

Rhinos won by 6 wickets
Queens Sports Club, Bulawayo
Umpires: Langton Rusere and Nkosehle Ndiweni

- Mid West Rhinos elected to field first
- Mgcini Dube (Tuskers) made his List A debut.
- Points: Mid West Rhinos 2, Matabeleland Tuskers 0

5 November 2023
09:30
Scorecard

Mountaineers; 168 (35.2 overs)	v	Eagles; 169/1 (21.2 overs)
Brian Bennett 61 (60); Tapiwa Mufudza 4/36 (10 overs)		Tinashe Kamunhukamwe 71* (55); Tendai Chatara 1/57 (8.1 overs)

Eagles won by 9 wickets
Mutare Sports Club, Mutare
Umpires: Sarah Dambanevana and Iknow Chabi

- Mashonaland Eagles elected to field first
- Points: Mashonaland Eagles 2, Mountaineers 0

5 November 2023
09:30
Scorecard

Tuskers; 252/9 (50 overs)	v	Rhinos; 249 (48 overs)
Milton Shumba 67 (88); Simon Mugava 3/34 (10 overs)		Antum Naqvi 100 (103); Sean Williams 3/33 (9 overs)

Tuskers won by 3 runs
Queens Sports Club, Bulawayo
Umpires: Langton Rusere and Colin Tlou

- Matabeleland Tuskers elected to bat first
- Points: Matabeleland Tuskers 2, Mid West Rhinos 0

10 November 2023
9:00
Scorecard

Rhinos; 278/8 (50 overs)	v	Eagles; 248 (46.4 overs)
Nick Welch 66 (63); Simon Mugava 3/40 (10 overs)		Prince Masvaure 54 (76); Alex Russell 3/55 (8 overs)

Eagles won by 30 runs
Kwekwe Sports Club, Kwekwe
Umpires: Iknow Chabi and Stanley Gogwe

- Mashonaland Eagles elected to bat first
- Points: Mashonaland Eagles 2, Mid West Rhinos 0

10 November 2023
9:00
Scorecard

Rocks; 233/7 (50 overs)	v	Tuskers; 218 (48.5 overs)
Tafadzwa Tsiga 77* (77); Christopher Mpofu 2/42 (10 overs)		Luke Jongwe 42 (45); Roy Kaia 3/38 (10 overs)

Rocks won by 15 runs
Masvingo Sports Club, Masvingo
Umpires: Langton Rusere and Sarah Dambanevana

- Matabeleland Tuskers, elected to field first
- Points: Southern Rocks 2, Matabeleland Tuskers 0

12 November 2023
9:00
Scorecard

Rhinos; 350/6 (50 overs)	v	Eagles; 305/9 (50 overs)
Antum Naqvi 146 (117); Faraz Akram 4/75 (10 overs)		Tinashe Kamunhukamwe 50 (28); Brandon Mavuta 4/60 (10 overs)

Rhinos won by 45 runs
Kwekwe Sports Club, Kwekwe
Umpires: Iknow Chabi and Oscar Tafirenyika

- Mashonaland Eagles elected to field first
- Points: Mid West Rhinos 2, Mashonaland Eagles 0

12 November 2023
9:00
Scorecard

Tuskers; 282 (49.5 overs)	v	Rocks; 283/5 (47 overs)
Brian Chari 113 (133); Trevor Gwandu 5/72 (8.5 overs)		Roy Kaia 82 (99); Ainsley Ndlovu 1/42 (10 overs)

Rocks won by 5 wickets
Masvingo Sports Club, Masvingo
Umpires: Langton Rusere and Percival Sizara

- Southern Rocks elected to field first
- Points: Southern Rocks 2, Matabeleland Tuskers 0

24 November 2023
9:00
Scorecard

Rhinos; 211 (49.2 Overs)	v	Rocks; 217/8 (42.3 Overs)
Brandon Mavuta 53 (68); Tendai Chisoro 3/19 (10 overs)		Johnathan Campbell 50 (62); Muhammad Adil 3/37 (9 overs)

Rocks won by 2 wickets
Kwekwe Sports Club, Kwekwe
Umpires: David Shawane and Stanley Gogwe

- Southern Rocks elected to field first
- Jalat Khan (Rocks) and Muhammad Adil (Rhinos) made their List A debut.
- Points: Southern Rocks 2, Mid West Rhinos 0

24 November 2023
9:00
Scorecard

Tuskers; 195/8 (50 Overs)	v	Mountaineers; 199/5 (39.4 Overs)
Hamid Ali 48 (91); Tony Munyonga 3/29 (6 Overs)		Tony Munyonga 59 (41); Ainsley Ndlovu 2/25 (10 Overs)

Mountaineers won by 5 wickets
Queens Sports Club, Bulawayo
Umpires: Christopher Phiri and Iknow Chabi

- Matabeleland Tuskers elected to bat first
- Mamoon Ur Riaz and Awad Naqvi (Tuskers); Salman Mirza, Hendrichs Machekeand, Tariro Makuyo (Mountaineers) made their List A debut.
- Points: Mountaineers 2, Matabeleland Tuskers 0

26 November 2023
9:00
Scorecard

Rhinos; 234/6 (39.3 Overs)	v	Rocks; 153 (22.1 Overs)
Ben Curran 66 (78); Roy Kaia 2/61 (10 Overs)		Roy Kaia 28 (22); Muhammad Adil 3/20 (4.1 Overs)

Rhinos won by 58 runs (DLS method)
Kwekwe Sports Club, Kwekwe
Umpires: David Shawane and Stanley Gogwe

- Southern Rocks elected to field first
- Rain interrupted play. Rhino's innings were cut short at 39.3. Rocks were set a revised target of 212 in 28 overs.
- Points: Mid West Rhinos 2, Southern Rocks 0

26 November 2023
9:00
Scorecard

Tuskers; 259/5 (50 Overs)	v	Mountaineers; 262/6 (39.5 Overs)
Nkosana Mpofu 110 (139); John Masara 3/45 (9 Overs)		Tony Munyonga 153* (104); Mamoon Ur Riaz 2/18 (7 Overs)

Mountaineers won by 4 wickets
Queens Sports Club, Bulawayo
Umpires: Christopher Phiri and Iknow Chabi

- Mountaineers elected to field first
- Arnold Shara (Tuskers) and Tinashe Chiorah (Mountaineers) made their List A debut.
- Points: Mountaineers 2, Matabeleland Tuskers 0

== Final ==
2 December 2023
9:00
Scorecard

Rhinos; 246/9 (50 overs)	v	Eagles; 247/5 (44.3 Overs)
Brandon Mavuta 69 (88); Hamza Sajjad 4/46 (8 overs)		Tinashe Kamunhukamwe 63 (49); Muhammad Adil 2/59 (7 overs)

Eagles won by 5 wickets
Takashinga Cricket Club, Harare
Umpires: Forster Mutizwa and Iknow Chabi
Player of the match: Tinashe Kamunhukamwe (Eagles)

- Mashonaland Eagles elected to field first
- Hamza Sajjad (Eagles) made his List A debut.
