= 2018–19 Pro50 Championship =

Cricket tournament

- Dates: 8 December 2018 – 9 March 2019
- Administrator(s): Zimbabwe Cricket
- Cricket format: List A cricket
- Tournament format(s): Round-robin and Final
- Champions: Mashonaland Eagles (5th title)
- Participants: 4
- Matches: 13
- Most runs: Craig Ervine (422)
- Most wickets: Daniel Jakiel (13)

The 2018–19 Pro50 Championship was the seventeenth edition of the Pro50 Championship, a List A cricket tournament that was played in Zimbabwe, which started on 8 December 2018. The tournament featured four teams, instead of the five that took part in the previous edition, with the Rising Stars being disbanded. The other change to the 2018–19 tournament was that it was played across six rounds, instead of ten, as per previous years. The Rising Stars were the defending champions.

The Mashonaland Eagles were the first team to qualify for the final of the tournament. They were joined in the final by the Matabeleland Tuskers, after they won their penultimate fixture by eight wickets. Mashonaland Eagles won the tournament, beating Matabeleland Tuskers by two wickets in the final.

== Points table ==
Team	Pld	W	L	NR	Pts	NRR
Mashonaland Eagles	6	5	0	1	24	+1.276
Matabeleland Tuskers	6	3	2	1	15	+0.239
Mountaineers	6	2	4	0	9	–0.049
Mid West Rhinos	6	1	5	0	4	–1.181

Advanced to the final

== Fixtures ==
=== Round-robin ===
8 December 2018
Scorecard

Mountaineers; 230/7 (50 overs)	v	Mid West Rhinos; 231/7 (43.3 overs)
Roy Kaia 99* (131); Graeme Cremer 2/41 (10 overs)		Tarisai Musakanda 78 (77); Victor Nyauchi 3/28 (8 overs)

Mid West Rhinos won by 3 wickets
Kwekwe Sports Club, Kwekwe
Umpires: Stanley Gogwe and Iknow Chabi

- Mid West Rhinos won the toss and elected to field.
- William Mashinge (Mountaineers) made his List A debut.

9 December 2018
Scorecard

Matabeleland Tuskers	v	Mashonaland Eagles

Match abandoned
Harare Sports Club, Harare
Umpires: Sifelani Rwaziyeni and Walter Musakwa

- No toss.
- No play was possible due to rain.

12 December 2018
Scorecard

Mid West Rhinos; 232 (45.4 overs)	v	Mashonaland Eagles; 236/5 (46 overs)
Bothwell Chapungu 54 (69); Chamu Chibhabha 3/40 (10 overs)		Elton Chigumbura 76* (98); Graeme Cremer 2/46 (10 overs)

Mashonaland Eagles won by 5 wickets
Harare Sports Club, Harare
Umpires: Langton Rusere and Walter Musakwa

- Mashonaland Eagles won the toss and elected to field.
- Keith Jaure (Mashonaland Eagles) made his List A debut.

23 February 2019
Scorecard

Mashonaland Eagles; 302/8 (50 overs)	v	Mountaineers; 175 (38.2 overs)
Regis Chakabva 105 (115); Shingi Masakadza 3/42 (8 overs)		Timycen Maruma 45 (49); Daniel Jakiel 3/40 (7 overs)

Mashonaland Eagles won by 127 runs
Mutare Sports Club, Mutare
Umpires: Percival Sizara and Iknow Chabi

- Mashonaland Eagles won the toss and elected to bat.
- Daniel Jakiel (Mashonaland Eagles) made his List A debut.

23 February 2019
Scorecard

Mid West Rhinos; 231/9 (50 overs)	v	Matabeleland Tuskers; 235/4 (40.3 overs)
Peter Moor 77 (103); Charlton Tshuma 3/61 (10 overs)		Craig Ervine 86* (98); Tendai Chisoro 2/54 (10 overs)

Matabeleland Tuskers won by 6 wickets
Queens Sports Club, Bulawayo
Umpires: Langton Rusere and Christopher Phiri

- Matabeleland Tuskers won the toss and elected to field.
- Charlton Tshuma (Matabeleland Tuskers) made his List A debut.

24 February 2019
Scorecard

Mashonaland Eagles; 181 (43 overs)	v	Mountaineers; 180 (36.3 overs)
Regis Chakabva 53 (63); Natsai M'shangwe 3/32 (8 overs)		Shingi Masakadza 31 (20); Chamu Chibhabha 3/24 (7.3 overs)

Mashonaland Eagles won by 1 run
Mutare Sports Club, Mutare
Umpires: Percival Sizara and Iknow Chabi

- Mashonaland Eagles won the toss and elected to bat.

24 February 2019
Scorecard

Matabeleland Tuskers; 191 (44.1 overs)	v	Mid West Rhinos; 81 (26 overs)
Cunningham Ncube 65 (99); Ryan Burl 3/35 (10 overs)		Tarisai Musakanda 29 (50); Sean Williams 4/16 (6 overs)

Matabeleland Tuskers won by 110 runs
Queens Sports Club, Bulawayo
Umpires: Langton Rusere and Christopher Phiri

- Matabeleland Tuskers won the toss and elected to bat.

1 March 2019
Scorecard

Mountaineers; 228/8 (50 overs)	v	Mid West Rhinos; 181 (43.2 overs)
Innocent Kaia 82 (92); Kyle Jarvis 6/35 (10 overs)		Prince Masvaure 71 (96); Roy Kaia 4/40 (9.2 overs)

Mountaineers won by 47 runs
Kwekwe Sports Club, Kwekwe
Umpires: Stanley Gogwe and Iknow Chabi

- Mountaineers won the toss and elected to bat.

1 March 2019
Scorecard

Matabeleland Tuskers; 283/5 (20 overs)	v	Mashonaland Eagles; 284/6 (49.1 overs)
Craig Ervine 168* (131); Trevor Garwe 2/41 (10 overs)		Richmond Mutumbami 99 (99); Sean Williams 2/47 (10 overs)

Mashonaland Eagles won by 4 wickets
Harare Sports Club, Harare
Umpires: Tafadzwa Musakwa and Langton Rusere

- Mashonaland Eagles won the toss and elected to field.
- Brian Mudzinganyama (Mashonaland Eagles) made his List A debut.

3 March 2019
Scorecard

Mid West Rhinos; 95	v	Mashonaland Eagles; 96/4 (18.5 overs)
Ryan Burl 23 (33); Daniel Jakiel 6/26 (7.4 overs)		Tinashe Kamunhukamwe 27 (28); Carl Mumba 1/7 (4 overs)

Mashonaland Eagles won by 6 wickets
Kwekwe Sports Club, Kwekwe
Umpires: Stanley Gogwe and Iknow Chabi

- Mashonaland Eagles won the toss and elected to field.

3 March 2019
Scorecard

Mountaineers; 235/9 (50 overs)	v	Matabeleland Tuskers; 236/2 (44.3 overs)
Forster Mutizwa 73 (84); Ernest Masuku 6/56 (10 overs)		Craig Ervine 111* (123); Natsai M'shangwe 1/41 (6.3 overs)

Matabeleland Tuskers won by 8 wickets
Takashinga Sports Club, Harare
Umpires: Sifelani Rwaziyeni and Percival Sizara

- Matabeleland Tuskers won the toss and elected to field.

5 March 2019
Scorecard

Mountaineers; 331/6 (50 overs)	v	Matabeleland Tuskers; 207 (44.2 overs)
Timycen Maruma 122 (92); Charlton Tshuma 2/64 (9 overs)		Charles Kunje 51 (58); Wellington Masakadza 4/25 (10 overs)

Mountaineers won by 124 runs
Takashinga Sports Club, Harare
Umpires: Sifelani Rwaziyeni and Walter Musakwa

- Mountaineers won the toss and elected to bat.

== Final ==
9 March 2019
Scorecard

Matabeleland Tuskers; 202 (45.2 overs)	v	Mashonaland Eagles; 203/8 (46.1 overs)
Ernest Masuku 67 (78); Patrick Mambo 2/36 (9 overs)		Tinashe Kamunhukamwe 73 (60); Ainsley Ndlovu 3/23 (10 overs)

Mashonaland Eagles won by 2 wickets
Harare Sports Club, Harare
Umpires: Iknow Chabi and Langton Rusere

- Mashonaland Eagles won the toss and elected to field.
