= 2024–25 Pro50 Championship =

Cricket tournament

- Dates: 25 October 2024 – 16 March 2025
- Administrator: Zimbabwe Cricket
- Cricket format: List A
- Tournament format: Double round-robin
- Host: Zimbabwe
- Champions: Mountaineers (5th title)
- Participants: 5
- Matches: 21
- Most runs: Antum Naqvi (413)
- Most wickets: Victor Nyauchi (15)

The 2024–25 Pro50 Championship was the 22nd edition of the Pro50 Championship, a List A cricket tournament that was played in Zimbabwe. It started on 20 October 2024 and last round was played on 3 March 2025. The Mashonaland Eagles were the defending champions.

== Points table ==
Pos	Team	Pld	W	L	NR	Pts	NRR
1	Mountaineers	8	5	3	0	10	−0.010
2	Rhinos	8	4	3	1	9	0.494
3	Eagles	8	4	4	0	8	0.171
4	Tuskers	8	3	3	2	8	−0.514
5	Rocks	8	2	5	1	5	−0.230

Source: ESPNcricinfo

Advance to final

=== Match summary ===
Team	Group matches								Play-offs
Team	1	2	3	4	5	6	7	8	Final
Mountaineers	0	2	4	4	4	6	8	10	W
Rhinos	0	2	4	4	5	7	7	9	L
Eagles	0	2	2	4	6	6	8	8	
Tuskers	2	2	2	3	4	6	6	8	
Rocks	2	2	4	5	5	5	5	5	

Win	Loss	Tie	No result	Eliminated

- Note: The total points at the end of each group match are listed.
- Note: Click on the points or results to see the match summary.

== Fixtures ==
=== Round 1 ===
25 October 2024
09:30
Scorecard

Eagles; 239 (46.2 overs)	v	Rocks; 240/4 (39.3 overs)
Craig Ervine 135 (133); Takudzwa Chataira 3/44 (7.2 overs)		Johnathan Campbell 77* (69); Tapiwa Mufudza 1/37 (10 overs)

Rocks won by 6 wickets
Takashinga Cricket Club, Harare
Umpires: Ashby Mutumbami and David Shawane
Player of the match: Roy Kaia (Rocks)

- Rocks won the toss and elected to field.
- Munashe Chipara (Eagles) and Newman Nyamhuri (Rocks) both made their List A debut.

25 October 2024
09:30
Scorecard

Rhinos; 160 (31.4 overs)	v	Tuskers; 160/7 (33.4 overs)
Solomon Mire 44 (37); Ernest Masuku 5/62 (8.4 overs)		Luke Jongwe 63* (68); Brad Evans 3/32 (10 overs)

Tuskers won by 3 wickets (DLS method)
Kwekwe Sports Club, Kwekwe
Umpires: Iknow Chabi and Stanley Gogwe
Player of the match: Ernest Masuku (Tuskers)

- Tuskers won the toss and elected to field.
- Ahsan Ali Aqil and Victor Chirwa (Eagles) both made their List A debuts.
- Tuskers were set a revised target of 160 runs from 47 overs due to rain.

=== Round 2 ===
5 November 2024
09:30
Scorecard

Eagles; 386/9 (50 overs)	v	Tuskers; 140 (30.1 overs)
Craig Ervine 88 (80); Luke Jongwe 3/40 (6 overs)		Taffy Mupariwa 33 (42); Dion Myers 5/36 (5.1 overs)

Eagles won by 246 runs
Queens Sports Club, Bulawayo
Umpires: Nkosehle Ndiweni and Percival Sizara
Player of the match: Dion Myers (Eagles)

- Tuskers won the toss and elected to field.
- Tinotenda Maposa (Tuskers) made his List A debut.
- Dion Myers (Eagles) took his first five-wicket haul in List A cricket.

5 November 2024
09:30
Scorecard

Mountaineers; 192 (41.3 overs)	v	Rhinos; 195/5 (41.1 overs)
Timycen Maruma 51 (56); Brandon Mavuta 4/53 (10 overs)		Takudzwanashe Kaitano 88 (120); Nkosilathi Nungu 2/51 (9 overs)

Rhinos won by 5 wickets
Kwekwe Sports Club, Kwekwe
Umpires: Stanley Gogwe and Christopher Phiri
Player of the match: Takudzwanashe Kaitano (Rhinos)

- Rhinos won the toss and elected to field.

=== Round 3 ===
23 November 2024
09:30
Scorecard

Rhinos; 318/8 (50 overs)	v	Eagles; 106 (19.1 overs)
Ben Curran 125 (130); Prosper Mugeri 3/52 (7 overs)		Tony Munyonga 26 (23); Hendrichs Macheke 3/23 (5 overs)

Rhinos won by 212 runs
Harare Sports Club, Harare
Umpires: Christopher Phiri and Oscar Tafirenyika
Player of the match: Ben Curran (Rhinos)

- Eagles won the toss and elected to field.
- Alex Falao (Eagles) made his List A debut.
- Ben Curran (Rhinos) scored his first century in List A cricket.

23 November 2024
09:30
Scorecard

Rocks; 314/8 (50 overs)	v	Mountaineers; 315/6 (43.2 overs)
Johnathan Campbell 87 (67); Khaif Patel 3/69 (10 overs)		Nick Welch 100 (87); William Mashinge 2/32 (6 overs)

Mountaineers won by 4 wickets
Mutare Sports Club, Mutare
Umpires: Ashby Mutumbami and Percival Sizara
Player of the match: Nick Welch (Mountaineers)

- Rocks won the toss and elected to bat.
- Tinaye Muzonde (Mountaineers) made his List A debut.

=== Round 4 ===
5 December 2024
09:30
Scorecard

Mountaineers; 279 (49.2 overs)	v	Tuskers; 279 (49.5 overs)
Mathew Welch 65 (83); Nkosana Mpofu 4/49 (10 overs)		Taffy Mupariwa 74 (85); Mike Frost 3/42 (10 overs)

Match tied (Mountaineers won the Super Over)
Mutare Sports Club, Mutare
Umpires: Sarah Dambanevana and Sifelani Rwaziyeni
Player of the match: Nick Welch (Mountaineers)

- Tuskers won the toss and elected to field.
- Super Over: Tuskers 18/0, Mountaineers 20/0

5 December 2024
09:30
Scorecard

Rhinos; 214 (46.5 overs)	v	Rocks; 215/5 (47.2 overs)
Ben Curran 53 (72); Newman Nyamhuri 4/43 (10 overs)		Panashe Taruvinga 80 (139); Antum Naqvi 3/33 (10 overs)

Rocks won by 5 wickets
Takashinga Cricket Club, Harare
Umpires: Tafadzwa Musakwa and Oscar Tafirenyika
Player of the match: Newman Nyamhuri (Rocks)

- Rocks won the toss and elected to field.
- Panashe Taruvinga (Rocks) made his List A debut.

=== Round 5 ===
4 January 2025
09:30
Scorecard

Eagles; 314/8 (50 overs)	v	Mountaineers; 267/8 (50 overs)
Tony Munyonga 70 (52); Definate Mawadzi 2/46 (8 overs)		Tinashe Chiorah 91 (125); Prosper Mugeri 2/22 (6 overs)

Eagles won by 47 runs
Harare Sports Club, Harare
Umpires: Sarah Dambanevana and Christopher Phiri
Player of the match: Tinashe Chiorah (Mountaineers)

- Mountaineers won the toss and elected to field.
- Emmanuel Bawa and Ryan Kamwemba (Eagles) both made their List A debuts.

4 January 2025
09:30
Scorecard

Rocks	v	Tuskers

Match abandoned
Takashinga Cricket Club, Harare
Umpires: Sifelani Rwaziyeni and Dylan Ziyambi

- No toss.
- No play was possible due to a rain and wet outfield.

=== Round 6 ===
15 January 2025
09:30
Scorecard

Eagles; 262 (49.4 overs)	v	Rocks; 253 (48.3 overs)
Tinashe Kamunhukamwe 61 (63); William Mashinge 4/37 (10 overs)		Ryan Higgins 89 (80); Faraz Akram 3/53 (9 overs)

Eagles won by 9 runs
Harare Sports Club, Harare
Umpires: Langton Rusere and Oscar Tafirenyika
Player of the match: Wessly Madhevere (Eagles)

- Rocks won the toss and elected to field.
- Shelton Mazvitorera (Rocks) made his List A debut.

15 January 2025
09:30
Scorecard

Rhinos; 287/7 (41 overs)	v	Tuskers; 13/1 (4.4 overs)
Antum Naqvi 131 (86); Ernest Masuku 2/52 (9 overs)		Nkosana Mpofu 7 (9)

No result
Bulawayo Athletic Club, Bulawayo
Umpires: Iknow Chabi and Collin Tlou

- Tuskers won the toss and elected to field.
- The match was reduced to 41 overs per side due to rain and wet outfield.
- Tuskers were set a revised target of 200 runs from 24 overs due to rain.
- Rain prevented any further play.

=== Round 7 ===
26 January 2025
09:30
Scorecard

Mountaineers; 168/4 (34 overs)	v	Rhinos; 144/9 (19.1 overs)
Matthew Welch 42* (60); Trevor Gwandu 2/37 (7 overs)		Takudzwanashe Kaitano 35 (33); Wellington Masakadza 3/26 (4 overs)

Rhinos won by 1 wicket (DLS method)
Mutare Sports Club, Mutare
Umpires: Sarah Dambanevana and Langton Rusere
Player of the match: Antum Naqvi (Rhinos)

- Rhinos won the toss and elected to field.
- The match was reduced to 34 overs per side due to rain and wet outfield.
- Anesu Kamuriwo (Mountaineers) made his List A debut.
- Rhinos were set a revised target of 144 runs from 20 overs due to rain.

26 January 2025
09:30
Scorecard

Eagles; 193 (43.1 overs)	v	Tuskers; 194/9 (48 overs)
Craig Ervine 54 (94); Ernest Masuku 4/33 (8 overs)		Brian Chari 57 (92); Tapiwa Mufudza 3/29 (10 overs)

Tuskers won by 1 wicket
Takashinga Cricket Club, Harare
Umpires: Stanley Gogwe and Sifelani Rwaziyeni
Player of the match: Ernest Masuku (Tuskers)

- Tuskers won the toss and elected to field.

=== Round 8 ===
7 February 2025
09:30
Scorecard

Mountaineers; 327/9 (50 overs)	v	Rocks; 269 (48.1 overs)
Timycen Maruma 100 (84); Roy Kaia 3/38 (10 overs)		Cephas Zhuwao 55 (41); Anesu Kamuriwo 3/44 (8 overs)

Mountaineers won by 58 runs
Takashinga Cricket Club, Harare
Umpires: Percival Sizara and Oscar Tafirenyika
Player of the match: Definate Mawadzi (Mountaineers)

- Rocks won the toss and elected to field.
- Matthew Campbell and Delan Hondo (Rocks) both made their List A debuts.

7 February 2025
09:30
Scorecard

Eagles; 264 (46.3 overs)	v	Rhinos; 221 (42.4 overs)
Tony Munyonga 67 (66); Antum Naqvi 3/35 (7 overs)		Antum Naqvi 76 (63); Tinotenda Maposa 4/42 (8.4 overs)

Eagles won by 43 runs
Kwekwe Sports Club, Kwekwe
Umpires: Christopher Phiri and Dylan Ziyambi
Player of the match: Tinotenda Maposa (Eagles)

- Rhinos won the toss and elected to field.
- Villan Changa (Rhinos) made his List A debut.

=== Round 9 ===
19 February 2025
09:30
Scorecard

Tuskers; 170/7 (36.1 overs)	v	Mountaineers; 160/6 (28.2 overs)
Brian Chari 61 (70); Victor Nyauchi 3/35 (6 overs)		Nick Welch 63* (39); Ernest Masuku 2/30 (5 overs)

Mountaineers won by 4 wickets (DLS method)
Queens Sports Club, Bulawayo
Umpires: Stanley Gogwe and Collin Tlou
Player of the match: Victor Nyauchi (Mountaineers)

- Mountaineers won the toss and elected to field.
- The second innings was reduced to 29 overs due to rain.
- Mountaineers were set a revised target of 160 runs from 29 overs.

19 February 2025
09:30
Scorecard

Rocks; 262/8 (48 overs)	v	Rhinos; 235/6 (44 overs)
Roy Kaia 91 (120); Brad Evans 2/46 (10 overs)		Takudzwanashe Kaitano 59 (76); Dylan Hondo 2/41 (10 overs)

Rhinos won by 6 runs (DLS method)
Kwekwe Sports Club, Kwekwe
Umpires: Tafadzwa Musakwa and Dylan Ziyambi
Player of the match: Antum Naqvi (Rhinos)

- Rhinos won the toss and elected to field.
- The first innings curtailed at 48 over due to rain.
- Rain prevented any further play.

=== Round 10 ===
3 March 2025
09:30
Scorecard

Eagles; 280 (47.2 overs)	v	Mountaineers; 281/8 (50 overs)
Kudzai Maunze 106 (104); Victor Nyauchi 3/45 (8.2 overs)		Ashley Mufandauya 71 (78); Tinotenda Maposa 3/47 (10 overs)

Mountaineers won by 2 wickets
Mutare Sports Club, Mutare
Umpires: Ashby Mutumbami and Oscar Tafirenyika
Player of the match: Ashley Mufandauya (Mountaineers)

- Mountaineers won the toss and elected to field.
- Kudzai Maunze (Eagles) scored his first century in List A cricket.

3 March 2025
09:30
Scorecard

Tuskers; 212 (49.2 overs)	v	Rocks; 173 (44.3 overs)
Taffy Mupariwa 35 (43); Tinaye Muzonde 3/25 (7 overs)		Roy Kaia 59 (97); Brandon James 4/23 (8.3 overs)

Tuskers won by 39 runs
Queens Sports Club, Bulawayo
Umpires: Nkosehle Ndiweni and Langton Rusere
Player of the match: Brian Mudzinganyama (Tuskers)

- Rocks won the toss and elected to field.
- Takundanashe Madembo (Rocks) made his List A debut.

== Final ==
Final
16 March 2025
09:30
Scorecard

Rhinos; 227 (46.2 overs)	v	Mountaineers; 193/4 (40 overs)
Ben Curran 73 (92); Tendai Chatara 4/30 (9 overs)		Brian Bennett 70* (93); Antum Naqvi 2/27 (9 overs)

Mountaineers won by 32 runs (DLS method)
Mutare Sports Club, Mutare
Umpires: Forster Mutizwa and Langton Rusere
Player of the match: Tendai Chatara (Mountaineers)

- Mountaineers won the toss and elected to field.
- No further play was possible due to rain.
