= 2020–21 Pro50 Championship =

Cricket tournament

- Dates: 18 – 28 April 2021
- Administrator: Zimbabwe Cricket
- Cricket format: List A cricket
- Tournament format(s): Round-robin and Final
- Champions: Rhinos (1st title)
- Participants: 5
- Matches: 12
- Most runs: Takudzwanashe Kaitano (247)
- Most wickets: John Nyumbu (11)

The 2020–21 Pro50 Championship was the nineteenth edition of the Pro50 Championship, a List A cricket tournament that was played in Zimbabwe. It started on 18 April 2021, with five teams taking part, and was the final domestic tournament in Zimbabwe's cricket calendar for the 2020–21 season. There was no defending champion, as the previous tournament was voided due to the COVID-19 pandemic.

Following the conclusion of the group stage, Tuskers and Eagles advanced to the third-place play-off, and Rocks and Rhinos qualified for the final of the tournament. Rhinos won the tournament, beating Rocks by 47 runs in the final.

== Points table ==
| Pos | Team | Pld | W | L | NR | Pts | NRR |
|---|---|---|---|---|---|---|---|
| 1 | Rocks | 4 | 3 | 1 | 0 | 30 | 1.486 |
| 2 | Rhinos | 4 | 3 | 1 | 0 | 30 | 1.284 |
| 3 | Tuskers | 4 | 3 | 1 | 0 | 30 | −0.095 |
| 4 | Eagles | 4 | 1 | 3 | 0 | 10 | −1.267 |
| 5 | Mountaineers | 4 | 0 | 4 | 0 | 0 | −1.398 |

Source: Cricinfo

Advanced to the Final Advanced to the 3rd Place Play-Off

== Fixtures ==
=== Round-robin ===
18 April 2021
Scorecard

| Mountaineers; 177 (44 overs) | v | Tuskers; 179/7 (35.5 overs) |
| Kevin Kasuza 43 (34); John Nyumbu 3/25 (10 overs) | | Brian Chari 46 (26); Brighton Chipungu 4/46 (9 overs) |

Tuskers won by 3 wickets
Old Hararians, Harare
Umpires: David Shawane and Stanley Gogwe
Player of the match: Brian Chari (Tuskers)

- Mountaineers won the toss and elected to bat.
- Bright Phiri, Clive Madande, Panashe Maphosa (Tuskers), Brighton Chipungu, Dion Myers and John Masara (Mountaineers) all made their List A debuts.

18 April 2021
Scorecard

| Eagles; 226 (49.5 overs) | v | Rhinos; 229/2 (37.3 overs) |
| Rodney Mupfudza 53 (83); Chris Mpofu 3/41 (9.5 overs) | | Tarisai Musakanda 77* (67); Ashley Mufandauya 1/22 (4 overs) |

Rhinos won by 8 wickets
Takashinga Cricket Club, Harare
Umpires: Percival Sizara and Walter Musakwa
Player of the match: Tarisai Musakanda (Rhinos)

- Rhinos won the toss and elected to field.
- Ashley Mufandauya, Brad Evans, Gareth Chirawu, Rodney Mupfudza, Tadiwanashe Nyangani and Tinashe Nenhunzi (Eagles) all made their List A debuts.

20 April 2021
Scorecard

| Tuskers; 132 (34.4 overs) | v | Rocks; 134/2 (15 overs) |
| Nkosana Mpofu 42 (56); Tendai Chisoro 4/12 (6.4 overs) | | Cephas Zhuwao 69* (35); Panashe Maphosa 1/15 (2 overs) |

Rocks won by 8 wickets
Old Hararians, Harare
Umpires: Collin Tlou and Percival Sizara

- Rocks won the toss and elected to field.
- Privilege Chesa (Rocks) made his List A debut.

20 April 2021
Scorecard

| Eagles; 231 (44.4 overs) | v | Mountaineers; 208 (45.5 overs) |
| Brad Evans 109 (92); Victor Nyauchi 5/41 (9 overs) | | Kevin Kasuza 35 (28); Honest Ziwira 3/52 (8.5 overs) |

Eagles won by 23 runs
Takashinga Cricket Club, Harare
Umpires: Oscar Tafirenyika and Tafadzwa Musakwa

- Mountaineers won the toss and elected to field.
- Akshay Patel (Mountaineers) and Malcolm Chikuwa (Eagles) both made their List A debuts.

22 April 2021
Scorecard

| Rocks; 235 (46.3 overs) | v | Rhinos; 236/7 (49.2 overs) |
| Tafadzwa Tsiga 50 (76); Carl Mumba 5/57 (9.3 overs) | | Bright Matsiwe 64 (62); Roy Kaia 3/25 (10 overs) |

Rhinos won by 3 wickets
Old Hararians, Harare
Umpires: David Shawane and Stanley Gogwe

- Rhinos won the toss and elected to field.
- Bright Matsiwe (Rhinos) made his List A debut.

22 April 2021
Scorecard

| Tuskers; 260/7 (50 overs) | v | Eagles; 188 (40.4 overs) |
| Alvin Chiradza 49* (43); Malcolm Chikuwa 2/34 (10 overs) | | Elton Chigumbura 55 (43); Tawanda Dzikiti 3/32 (7.4 overs) |

Tuskers won by 72 runs
Takashinga Cricket Club, Harare
Umpires: N Ndiweni and Tafadzwa Musakwa

- Eagles won the toss and elected to field.
- Tawanda Dzikiti (Tuskers) made his List A debut.

24 April 2021
Scorecard

| Rhinos; 219 (49 overs) | v | Tuskers; 220/8 (50 overs) |
| Carl Mumba 47* (50); Ainsley Ndlovu 3/35 (10 overs) | | Brian Chari 61 (70); Prince Masvaure 3/30 (9 overs) |

Tuskers won by 2 wickets
Old Hararians, Harare
Umpires: N Ndiweni and Percival Sizara

- Tuskers won the toss and elected to field.

24 April 2021
Scorecard

| Rocks; 142 (31.5 overs) | v | Mountaineers; 137 (38.2 overs) |
| Larvet Masunda 36 (46); Akshay Patel 3/25 (4 overs) | | Shingi Masakadza 53 (66); Tendai Chisoro 3/29 (10 overs) |

Rocks won by 5 runs
Takashinga Cricket Club, Harare
Umpires: Stanley Gogwe and Walter Musakwa

- Mountaineers won the toss and elected to field.
- Nkosilathi Nungu (Rocks) and Spencer Magodo (Mountaineers) both made their List A debuts.

26 April 2021
Scorecard

| Eagles; 170 (33.5 overs) | v | Rocks; 172/6 (25.1 overs) |
| Ashley Mufandauya 47 (54); Brian Mudzinganyama 4/18 (6.5 overs) | | Brian Mudzinganyama 66 (48); Tadiwanashe Nyangani 3/43 (8 overs) |

Rocks won by 4 wickets
Old Hararians, Harare
Umpires: Oscar Tafirenyika and Tafadzwa Musakwa

- Eagles won the toss and elected to bat.
- Tadiwanashe Marumani (Rocks) made his List A debut.

26 April 2021
Scorecard

| Rhinos; 335/6 (50 overs) | v | Mountaineers; 153 (35.2 overs) |
| Tashinga Musekiwa 61* (40); Akshay Patel 2/54 (6 overs) | | Baxon Gopito 49 (60); Brandon Mavuta 5/37 (10 overs) |

Rhinos won by 182 runs
Takashinga Cricket Club, Harare
Umpires: Collin Tlou and Walter Musakwa

- Mountaineers won the toss and elected to field.
- Nigel Bonyongwe (Mountaineers) and Tashinga Musekiwa (Rhinos) both made their List A debuts.

=== Finals ===
3rd Place Play-Off
28 April 2021
Scorecard

| Tuskers; 221 (49 overs) | v | Eagles; 136 (36.1 overs) |
| Brian Chari 92 (91); Daniel Jakiel 5/21 (8 overs) | | Gareth Chirawu 63 (91); John Nyumbu 5/21 (7.1 overs) |

Tuskers won by 85 runs
Old Hararians, Harare
Umpires: Tafadzwa Musakwa and Percival Sizara

- Eagles won the toss and elected to field.

Final
28 April 2021
Scorecard

| Rhinos; 297/8 (50 overs) | v | Rocks; 250 (49 overs) |
| Takudzwanashe Kaitano 122 (118); Nkosilathi Nungu 3/80 (10 overs) | | Brian Mudzinganyama 53 (65); Brandon Mavuta 3/40 (10 overs) |

Rhinos won by 47 runs
Takashinga Cricket Club, Harare
Umpires: Stanley Gogwe and David Shawane

- Rocks won the toss and elected to field.
- Sydney Murombo (Rocks) made his List A debut.
