= 2017–18 Pro50 Championship =

Cricket tournament

- Dates: 1 December 2017 – 2 June 2018
- Administrator: Zimbabwe Cricket
- Cricket format: List A cricket
- Tournament format(s): Round-robin and Final
- Champions: Rising Stars (1st title)
- Participants: 5
- Matches: 21
- Player of the series: Tony Munyonga
- Most runs: Tinashe Kamunhukamwe (379)
- Most wickets: Natsai Mushangwe (17)

The 2017–18 Pro50 Championship was the sixteenth edition of the Pro50 Championship, a List A cricket tournament that was played in Zimbabwe. The tournament included a new team, the Rising Stars, along with the existing four teams. Matabeleland Tuskers were the defending champions.

The competition was originally scheduled to run from 1 December 2017 to 31 March 2018. However, in December 2017, Zimbabwe Cricket postponed all the remaining fixtures scheduled to take place in the tournament. Zimbabwe Cricket were struggling to pay players' salaries for November and December and wanted to upgrade their facilities for the 2018 Cricket World Cup Qualifier, which took place in Zimbabwe in March 2018. Initially, the tournament did not resume after the Cricket World Cup Qualifier, with only the first round of fixtures taking place. However, in April 2018, Zimbabwe Cricket confirmed that the tournament would restart, with the remaining rounds of the competition to be played during April, May and June 2018. After a gap of more than four months, the second round of fixtures resumed on 17 April 2018.

Following the conclusion of the penultimate round of fixtures, both Rising Stars and Mountaineers advanced to the final, after the defending champions, Matabeleland Tuskers, failed to secure a bonus point with their victory over Mountaineers. In the final, Rising Stars beat Mountaineers by 144 runs to win their first title.

== Points table ==
The following teams competed in the tournament:

Pos	Team	Pld	W	L	T	NR	BP	Pts	NRR
1	Rising Stars	8	5	2	0	1	3	25	0.950
2	Mountaineers	8	4	3	0	1	3	21	0.284
3	Matabeleland Tuskers	8	4	3	0	1	2	20	0.083
4	Mashonaland Eagles	8	3	5	0	0	0	12	−0.615
5	Mid West Rhinos	8	2	5	0	1	1	11	−0.558

Advanced to the final

== Fixtures ==
=== Round 1 ===
1 December 2017
Scorecard

Mid West Rhinos; 283/7 (50 overs)	v	Mashonaland Eagles; 287/5 (48.2 overs)
Brendan Taylor 110 (101); Liam Roche 3/43 (7 overs)		Chamu Chibhabha 64 (82); Tendai Chisoro 2/36 (10 overs)

Mashonaland Eagles won by 5 wickets
Harare Sports Club, Harare
Umpires: Sifelani Rwaziyeni and Russell Tiffin

- Mid West Rhinos won the toss and elected to bat.
- Liam Roche (Mashonaland Eagles) and Trevor Gwandu (Mid West Rhinos) both made their List A debuts.

1 December 2017
Scorecard

Matabeleland Tuskers; 169 (44.1 overs)	v	Mountaineers; 170/5 (33.4 overs)
Richmond Mutumbami 38 (51); Wellington Masakadza 3/25 (10 overs)		Vusi Sibanda 87* (90); John Nyumbu 2/22 (6 overs)

Mountaineers won by 5 wickets
Queens Sports Club, Bulawayo
Umpires: Jeremiah Matibiri and Christopher Phiri

- Matabeleland Tuskers won the toss and elected to bat.
- Mohammad Eqlakh (Mountaineers) made his List A debut.

=== Round 2 ===
17 April 2018
Scorecard

Mountaineers; 226 (47.4 overs)	v	Mid West Rhinos; 122 (35 overs)
Hamilton Masakadza 61 (81); Tendai Chisoro 2/32 (10 overs)		Nyasha Mayavo 44 (49); Natsai M'shangwe 3/16 (6 overs)

Mountaineers won by 104 runs
Mutare Sports Club, Mutare
Umpires: Jeremiah Matibiri and Ashby Mutumbami

- Mountaineers won the toss and elected to bat.
- Jabulisa Tshuma (Mid West Rhinos) made his List A debut.

17 April 2018
Scorecard

Rising Stars; 276/8 (50 overs)	v	Mashonaland Eagles; 273/6 (46.3 overs)
Tony Munyonga 74 (88); Brighton Zhawi 2/34 (8 overs)		Tinotenda Mutombodzi 67 (89); Richard Ngarava 2/42 (5.4 overs)

Mashonaland Eagles won by 28 runs (D/L method)
Takashinga Sports Club, Harare
Umpires: Langton Rusere and Iknow Chabi

- Mashonaland Eagles won the toss and elected to field.
- Tinashe Kamunhukamwe, Tony Munyonga, Thamsanqa Keith Nunu, Faraz Akram and Patrick Mambo (Rising Stars) all made their List A debuts.

=== Round 3 ===
29 April 2018
Scorecard

Mid West Rhinos; 218 (48.4 overs)	v	Rising Stars; 220/5 (44.3 overs)
Bothwell Chapungu 85 (94); Tinashe Muchawaya 4/31 (6.4 overs)		Tarisai Musakanda 50* (65); Trevor Chibvongodze 2/49 (10 overs)

Rising Stars won by 5 wickets
Harare Sports Club, Harare
Umpires: Walter Musakwa and Russell Tiffin

- Rising Stars won the toss and elected to field.
- Tinashe Muchawaya, Honest Ziwira, Rugare Magarira (Rising Stars) and Trevor Chibvongodze (Mid West Rhinos) all made their List A debuts.

30 April 2018
Scorecard

Matabeleland Tuskers; 236/7 (50 overs)	v	Mashonaland Eagles; 116 (38.1 overs)
Nkosana Mpofu 49 (88); Brighton Zhawi 3/44 (8 overs)		Joylord Gumbie 42 (67); Chris Mpofu 3/15 (7 overs)

Matabeleland Tuskers won by 120 runs
Queens Sports Club, Bulawayo
Umpires: Christopher Phiri and Lucky Ngwenya

- Mashonaland Eagles won the toss and elected to field.
- Larvet Masunda and Brendon Timoni (Mashonaland Eagles) both made their List A debuts.

=== Round 4 ===
11 May 2018
Scorecard

Mid West Rhinos; 193 (47 overs)	v	Matabeleland Tuskers; 194/5 (30.5 overs)
Nyasha Mayavo 49 (72); Brian Vitori 3/31 (9 overs)		Richmond Mutumbami 90 (64); Michael Chinouya 4/48 (8.5 overs)

Matabeleland Tuskers won by 5 wickets
Queens Sports Club, Bulawayo
Umpires: Jeremiah Matibiri and Lucky Ngwenya

- Mid West Rhinos won the toss and elected to bat.

11 May 2018
Scorecard

Mountaineers; 126 (40 overs)	v	Rising Stars; 127/1 (26.4 overs)
Tinashe Chimbambo 46 (71); Tony Munyonga 4/9 (8 overs)		Tafadzwa Tsiga 48* (76); Tendai Chatara 1/17 (6 overs)

Rising Stars won by 9 wickets
Takashinga Sports Club, Harare
Umpires: Russell Tiffin and Iknow Chabi

- Rising Stars won the toss and elected to field.
- Ngoni Mupamba (Mountaineers) made his List A debut.

=== Round 5 ===
22 May 2018
Scorecard

Rising Stars; 214 (40.2 overs)	v	Matabeleland Tuskers; 215/4 (45.5 overs)
Tinashe Kamunhukamwe 47 (17); Ernest Masuku 5/50 (10 overs)		Brian Chari 79 (102); Tinashe Muchawaya 2/37 (5 overs)

Matabeleland Tuskers won by 6 wickets
Harare Sports Club, Harare
Umpires: Percival Sizara and Russell Tiffin

- Matabeleland Tuskers won the toss and elected to field.
- Allan Chigoma (Matabeleland Tuskers) made his List A debut.

22 May 2018
Scorecard

Mashonaland Eagles; 116 (36.3 overs)	v	Mountaineers; 117/2 (25.2 overs)
Liam Roche 44* (59); Victor Nyauchi 3/39 (7.3 overs)		Hamilton Masakadza 53* (62); Tanyaradzwa Munyaradzi 1/18 (8 overs)

Mountaineers won by 8 wickets
Old Hararians, Harare
Umpires: Jeremiah Matibiri and Tafadzwa Musakwa

- Mountaineers won the toss and elected to field.
- Zaheer Muhammad (Mashonaland Eagles) made his List A debut.

=== Round 6 ===
23 May 2018
Scorecard

Mashonaland Eagles; 212/9 (50 overs)	v	Matabeleland Tuskers; 196 (45.1 overs)
Elton Chigumbura 75 (92); John Nyumbu 3/29 (10 overs)		Chris Mpofu 41 (84); Tapiwa Mufudza 3/25 (10 overs)

Mashonaland Eagles won by 16 runs
Harare Sports Club, Harare
Umpires: Iknow Chabi and Percival Sizara

- Matabeleland Tuskers won the toss and elected to field.

23 May 2018
Scorecard

Rising Stars; 207 (46.4 overs)	v	Mid West Rhinos; 141 (30.5 overs)
Ryan Burl 59 (79); Tendai Chisoro 5/30 (9.4 overs)		Nyasha Mayavo 55 (59); Patrick Mambo 4/34 (7.5 overs)

Rising Stars won by 66 runs
Old Hararians, Harare
Umpires: Russell Tiffin and Walter Musakwa

- Mid West Rhinos won the toss and elected to field.
- Takudzwanashe Kaitano (Mid West Rhinos) made his List A debut.

=== Round 7 ===
25 May 2018
Scorecard

Matabeleland Tuskers; 114 (19.5 overs)	v	Rising Stars; 115/2 (20 overs)
Brian Chari 29 (17); Rugare Magarira 7/19 (6.5 overs)		Tinashe Kamunhukamwe 58 (41); John Nyumbu 1/7 (3 overs)

Rising Stars won by 8 wickets
Harare Sports Club, Harare
Umpires: Stanley Gogwe and Langton Rusere

- Matabeleland Tuskers won the toss and elected to bat.

25 May 2018
Scorecard

Mashonaland Eagles; 186 (44.1 overs)	v	Mountaineers; 180/6 (43.5 overs)
Chamu Chibhabha 60 (100); Natsai M'shangwe 4/44 (10 overs)		Hamilton Masakadza 65* (103); Brighton Zhawi 2/39 (8.5 overs)

Mountaineers won by 27 runs (D/L method)
Old Hararians, Harare
Umpires: Iknow Chabi and Jeremiah Matibiri

- Mashonaland Eagles won the toss and elected to bat.

=== Round 8 ===
27 May 2018
Scorecard

Matabeleland Tuskers; 39/4 (11.5 overs)	v	Mid West Rhinos
Nkosana Mpofu 15 (19); Tendai Chisoro 2/10 (3 overs)

No result
Old Hararians, Harare
Umpires: Walter Musakwa and Josphat Mutapure

- Matabeleland Tuskers won the toss and elected to bat.
- The match was called off due to an unsafe pitch.

27 May 2018
Scorecard

Mountaineers; 241 (47 overs)	v	Rising Stars; 101/3 (15.4 overs)
Tinashe Kamunhukamwe 128 (98); Natsai M'shangwe 3/43 (10 overs)		Hamilton Masakadza 60* (39); Faraz Akram 2/26 (4 overs)

No result
Takashinga Sports Club, Harare
Umpires: Tafadzwa Musakwa and Stanley Gogwe

- Mountaineers won the toss and elected to field.

=== Round 9 ===
28 May 2018
Scorecard

Mid West Rhinos; 217/8 (50 overs)	v	Mashonaland Eagles; 208 (38.3 overs)
Neville Madziva 52* (71); Donald Samunderu 3/32 (10 overs)		Neville Madziva 52* (71); Donald Samunderu 3/32 (10 overs)

Mid West Rhinos won by 9 runs
Takashinga Sports Club, Harare
Umpires: Walter Musakwa and Percival Sizara

- Mashonaland Eagles won the toss and elected to field.

28 May 2018
Scorecard

Matabeleland Tuskers; 275/9 (50 overs)	v	Mountaineers; 222/6 (46 overs)
Brian Chari 125 (142); Victor Nyauchi 4/76 (10 overs)		Kevin Kasuza 113 (136); Ainsley Ndlovu 2/42 (10 overs)

Matabeleland Tuskers won by 18 runs (D/L method)
Harare Sports Club, Harare
Umpires: Josphat Mutapure and Stanley Gogwe

- Mountaineers won the toss and elected to field.
- Baxon Gopito (Mountaineers) made his List A debut.

=== Round 10 ===
30 May 2018
Scorecard

Mid West Rhinos; 269/7 (50 overs)	v	Mountaineers; 173 (38.2 overs)
Prince Masvaure 83 (107); Travor Mutsamba 3/34 (8 overs)		Tino Mawoyo 36 (38); Michael Chinouya 3/33 (8 overs)

Mid West Rhinos won by 96 runs
Takashinga Sports Club, Harare
Umpires: Stanley Gogwe and Walter Musakwa

- Mountaineers won the toss and elected to field.
- Travor Mutsamba (Mountaineers) made his List A debut.

30 May 2018
Scorecard

Rising Stars; 257/9 (50 overs)	v	Mashonaland Eagles; 236 (49.1 overs)
Faraz Akram 66 (109); Kudakwashe Munyede 2/30 (7 overs)		Elton Chigumbura 65 (94); Tinashe Muchawaya 3/47 (9.1 overs)

Rising Stars won by 21 runs
Old Hararians, Harare
Umpires: Tafadzwa Musakwa and Josphat Mutapure

- Rising Stars won the toss and elected to bat.

== Final ==
2 June 2018
Scorecard

Rising Stars; 281/9 (50 overs)	v	Mountaineers; 137 (30.1 overs)
Tony Munyonga 65 (55); Donald Tiripano 6/55 (8 overs)		Hamilton Masakadza 50 (70); Brandon Mavuta 8/38 (8.1 overs)

Rising Stars won by 144 runs
Harare Sports Club, Harare
Umpires: Russell Tiffin and Langton Rusere

- Mountaineers won the toss and elected to field.
