= 2020–21 Logan Cup =

Cricket tournament

- Dates: 9 December 2020 – 2 April 2021
- Administrator(s): Zimbabwe Cricket
- Cricket format: First-class cricket (4 days)
- Tournament format(s): League system
- Champions: Rocks (1st title)
- Participants: 5
- Matches: 10
- Most runs: Roy Kaia (374)
- Most wickets: Tendai Chisoro (18)

The 2020–21 Logan Cup was the 27th edition of the Logan Cup, a first-class cricket competition in Zimbabwe, which started on 9 December 2020. After originally scheduled to start on 3 December 2020, the tournament was moved back a week to allow time to set up a bio-secure bubble. Five teams took part in the competition, including the Southern Rocks, who last played in the 2013–14 tournament. There was no defending champion, after the previous tournament was voided due to the COVID-19 pandemic.

Four matches were played during December 2020. However, on 3 January 2021, Zimbabwe Cricket halted all cricket in the country following a rise in COVID-19 cases. In mid-March 2021, it was reported that the tournament would resume later that month, with the next round of matches starting on 18 March 2021.

In March 2021, Rocks won their first ever Logan Cup title, with a match left to play.

== Point table ==
Team	Pld	W	L	D	A	Pts
Rocks	4	4	0	0	0	40
Eagles	4	2	1	1	0	25
Rhinos	4	1	1	2	0	20
Tuskers	4	0	2	2	0	10
Mountaineers	4	0	3	1	0	5

Champions

== Squads ==
The following squads were named for the tournament:

Eagles	Mountaineers	Rhinos	Rocks	Tuskers
Chamu Chibhabha (c); Faraz Akram; Regis Chakabva; Tatenda Chikuni; Malcolm Chikuwa; Gareth Chirawu; Tanaka Chivanga; Brad Evans; Daniel Jakiel; Keith Jaure; Tinashe Kamunhukamwe; Oskar Kolk; Wesley Madhevere; Kudzai Maunze; Ashley Mufandauya; Tapiwa Mufudza; Kudakwashe Munyede; Cuthbert Musoko; Tinotenda Mutombodzi; Tinashe Nenhunzi; Tadiwanashe Nyangani; Brendon Timoni; Brighton Zhawi	Kevin Kasuza (c); Brighton Chipungu; Tendai Chatara; Tinashe Chimbambo; Tinashe Chiora; Clive Chiposi; Munashe Chipara; Clive Chitumba; Baxon Gopito; Joylord Gumbie; Tanyaradzwa Kagumba; Hendricks Macheke; Spencer Magodo; Timycen Maruma; John Masara; Shingirai Masakadza; Wellington Masakadza; Definite Mawadzi; Frank Mwazviita; Tinashe Muchawaya; Prosper Mugeri; Tony Munyonga; Dion Myers; Victor Nyauchi; Akshay Patel; Kudzai Sauramba; Shadreck Shawarira; Donald Tiripano; Nick Welch	Tarisai Musakanda (c); Ryan Burl; Johnathan Campbell; Trevor Chibvongodze; Elson Chikowero; Manson Chikowero; Tafara Chingwara; Trevor Gwandu; Takudzwanashe Kaitano; Charles Kunje; Kudakwashe Macheka; Neville Madziva; Joshua Mahwire; Christophe Masike; Ronald Masocha; Prince Masvaure; Walter Matawu; Brandon Mavuta; Nyasha Mayavo; Christopher Mpofu; Wallace Mubaiwa; Carl Mumba; Davis Murwendo; Tashinga Musekiwa; Remembrance Nyathi; Nqobile Sibanda; Brendan Taylor; Jabulisa Tshuma; Mthulisi Tshuma	Richmond Mutumbami (c); Privilege Chesa; Tendai Chisoro; Ben Curran; Alistair Frost; Daniel Hondo; Gabriel Jaya; Innocent Kaia; Roy Kaia; Patrick Mambo; Tadiwanashe Marumani; William Mashinge; Brian Mudzinganyama; Sydney Murombo; Trevor Mutsamba; Blessing Muzarabani; Nkosilathi Nungu; Andre Odendaal; Sikandar Raza; Shane Snater; Tafadzwa Tsiga; Costa Zhou; Cephas Zhuwao	Brian Chari (c); Tanatswa Bechani; Allan Chigoma; Steve Chimhamhiwa; Mpokuhle Dube; Talent Dzikiti; Craig Ervine; Aarsh Jha; Luke Jongwe; Prince Kaunda; Clive Madande; Tanunurwa Makoni; Panashe Maposa; Ernest Masuku; Dalubhle Mboyi; Thabo Mboyi; Peter Moor; Nkosana Mpofu; Admire Mupembe; Sheunopa Musekwa; Tanaka Mutomba; Cunningham Ncube; Thembelani Ncube; Ainsley Ndlovu; Thamsanqa Nunu; John Nyumbu; Bright Phiri; Arnold Shara; Milton Shumba; Charlton Tshuma; Sean Williams

== Fixtures ==
9–12 December 2020
Scorecard

Mountaineers	v	Eagles
171 (54.1 overs); Kevin Kasuza 70 (93); Tanaka Chivanga 3/32 (11 overs)		172 (58.3 overs); Tinotenda Mutombodzi 63 (85); Victor Nyauchi 3/28 (11 overs)
147 (65 overs); Tony Munyonga 41 (119); Faraz Akram 4/30 (15 overs)		148/4 (40.3 overs); Wesley Madhevere 44* (28); Wellington Masakadza 3/42 (14.3 overs)

Eagles won by 6 wickets
Harare Sports Club, Harare
Umpires: Langton Rusere and David Shawane

- Eagles won the toss and elected to field.
- Dion Myers (Mountaineers), Gareth Chirawu and Tanaka Chivanga (Mashonaland Eagles) all made their first-class debuts.

9–12 December 2020
Scorecard

Rhinos	v	Tuskers
254/8d (85 overs); Takudzwanashe Kaitano 86 (166); John Nyumbu 4/45 (23 overs)		333 (85.1 overs); Milton Shumba 79 (158); Ryan Burl 3/50 (15 overs)
133/1 (44 overs); Prince Masvaure 54* (128); Luke Jongwe 1/18 (5 overs)

Match drawn
Old Hararians, Harare
Umpires: Iknow Chabi and Christopher Phiri

- Rhinos won the toss and elected to bat.
- Only 11.5 overs were bowled on day 1 due to a wet outfield.
- Only 16 overs were bowled on day 2 due to rain.

15–18 December 2020
Scorecard

Eagles	v	Rhinos
161 (49.2 overs); Regis Chakabva 44 (83); Brandon Mavuta 4/14 (6.2 overs)		311 (95.4 overs); Bright Matsiwe 89 (131); Tanaka Chivanga 4/47 (18 overs)

Match drawn
Harare Sports Club, Harare
Umpires: Iknow Chabi and Sifelani Rwaziyeni

- Eagles won the toss and elected to bat.
- Only 12.5 overs were bowled on day 1 due to rain.
- No play was possible on day 3 due to rain.

15–18 December 2020
Scorecard

Tuskers	v	Rocks
159 (42.3 overs); Milton Shumba 43 (77); Shane Snater 5/45 (15 overs)		321 (90.2 overs); Richmond Mutumbami 74 (106); Charlton Tshuma 3/68 (22 overs)
204 (59.2 overs); Craig Ervine 97 (135); Tendai Chisoro 4/60 (19.2 overs)		45/0 (11 overs); Ben Curran 35* (33)

Rocks won by 10 wickets
Old Hararians, Harare
Umpires: Christopher Phiri and Tafadzwa Musakwa

- Tuskers won the toss and elected to bat.
- Only 39 overs were bowled on day 1 due to rain.

18–21 March 2021
Scorecard

Mountaineers	v	Tuskers
433 (120.3 overs); Shingi Masakadza 89 (101); John Nyumbu 4/100 (32.2 overs)		313 (77.5 overs); Peter Moor 73 (58); Brighton Chipungu 4/106 (27 overs)
187 (81.1 overs); Joylord Gumbie 62 (163); Ainsley Ndlovu 5/60 (30 overs)		234/6 (67 overs); Peter Moor 85 (119); Shingi Masakadza 2/20 (8 overs)

Match drawn
Old Hararians, Harare
Umpires: Langton Rusere and Stanley Gogwe

- Mountaineers won the toss and elected to bat.
- Baxon Gopito, Brighton Chipungu and Frank Mwazviita (Mountaineers) all made their first-class debuts.

18–21 March 2021
Scorecard

Rocks	v	Rhinos
471 (130 overs); Roy Kaia 133 (218); Carl Mumba 5/77 (27 overs)		259 (82 overs); Remembrance Nyathi 84 (183); Travor Mutsamba 4/33 (16 overs)
178/5d (42 overs); Innocent Kaia 99 (116); Charles Kunje 2/22 (5 overs)		205 (81.5 overs); Bright Matsiwe 36 (111); Roy Kaia 6/34 (12.5 overs)

Rocks won by 185 runs
Harare Sports Club, Harare
Umpires: Christopher Phiri and Percival Sizara

- Rhinos won the toss and elected to field.
- Andre Odendaal, Gabriel Jaya and Tadiwanashe Marumani (Rocks) all made their first-class debuts.

24–27 March 2021
Scorecard

Eagles	v	Rocks
193 (61 overs); Kudzai Maunze 51 (81); Tendai Chisoro 4/37 (13 overs)		449 (116 overs); Roy Kaia 96 (159); Honest Ziwira 4/98 (23 overs)
137 (46.3 overs); Kudzai Maunze 40 (77); Tendai Chisoro 3/15 (10 overs)

Rocks won by an innings and 119 runs
Old Hararians, Harare
Umpires: Iknow Chabi and Sifelani Rwaziyeni

- Eagles won the toss and elected to bat.
- Tadiwanashe Nyangani (Eagles) made his first-class debut.

24–27 March 2021
Scorecard

Mountaineers	v	Rhinos
290 (88.4 overs); Shingi Masakadza 77 (101); Brandon Mavuta 4/126 (34 overs)		286 (87 overs); Charles Kunje 79 (1149); Tony Munyonga 4/35 (11 overs)
366 (89.2 overs); Timycen Maruma 143 (139); Tafara Chingwara 4/26 (8.5 overs)		371/9 (86.1 overs); Brendan Taylor 86 (91); Brighton Chipungu 4/49 (8 overs)

Rhinos won by 1 wicket
Harare Sports Club, Harare
Umpires: Christopher Phiri and Forster Mutizwa

- Mountaineers won the toss and elected to bat.

30 March – 2 April 2021
Scorecard

Rocks	v	Mountaineers
292 (97.2 overs); Innocent Kaia 81 (139); Vincent Masekesa 3/71 (23 overs)		211 (66 overs); Tony Munyonga 58 (142); Travor Mutsamba 4/60 (16 overs)
325 (90.5 overs); Andre Odendaal 47 (50); Clive Chitumba 4/66 (17 overs)		252 (84.2 overs); Gary Chirimuuta 89 (133); Roy Kaia 5/62 (25.2 overs)

Rocks won by 154 runs
Old Hararians, Harare
Umpires: Forster Mutizwa and Iknow Chabi

- Rocks won the toss and elected to bat.
- Vincent Masekesa (Mountaineers) made his first-class debut.

30 March – 2 April 2021
Scorecard

Tuskers	v	Eagles
114 (33 overs); Milton Shumba 30 (60); Brad Evans 5/25 (10 overs)		344 (89.3 overs); Regis Chakabva 164 (186); John Nyumbu 4/76 (19.3 overs)
153 (49 overs); Luke Jongwe 32 (60); Richard Ngarava 4/46 (17 overs)

Eagles won by an innings and 77 runs
Harare Sports Club, Harare
Umpires: Langton Rusere and Tafadzwa Musakwa

- Tuskers won the toss and elected to bat.
- Arnold Shara and Clive Madande (Tuskers) both made their first-class debuts.
