= 2014–15 Logan Cup =

- Administrator: Zimbabwe Cricket
- Cricket format: First-class cricket (4 days)
- Tournament format: League system
- Champions: Matabeleland Tuskers (4th title)
- Participants: 4
- Matches: 18
- Most runs: 630 – Tinotenda Mutombodzi (Mashonaland Eagles)
- Most wickets: 39 – Bradley Wadlan (Mid West Rhinos)

The 2014–15 Logan Cup was a first-class cricket competition held in Zimbabwe from 9 December 2013 to 26 April 2014. After the 2013–14 season Southern Rocks, consistently the weakest of the five teams, had their franchise suspended, leaving only four teams to compete. The tournament was won by the Matabeleland Tuskers, who claimed their fourth title.

Tinotenda Mutombodzi of the Mashonaland Eagles finished the competition as the leading run-scorer, accumulating 630 runs. The leading wicket-taker was Welshman Bradley Wadlan of the Mid West Rhinos, with 39 wickets, who had previously played Minor Counties for Herefordshire and Wales Minor Counties.

== Points table ==
Team	Pld	W	L	D	T	A	Pts
Matabeleland Tuskers	9	5	3	1	0	0	38
Mid West Rhinos	9	5	4	0	0	0	35
Mashonaland Eagles	9	4	4	1	0	0	30
Mountaineers	9	2	5	2	0	0	18
Source:ESPNcricinfo
