= Zimbabwean cricket team in Sri Lanka in 2017 =

International cricket tour

	Sri Lanka	Zimbabwe
- Dates: 30 June – 18 July 2017
Captains	Angelo Mathews (ODIs); Dinesh Chandimal (Tests)	Graeme Cremer

Test series
- Result: Sri Lanka won the 1-match series 1–0
Most runs	Asela Gunaratne (125)	Craig Ervine (165)
Most wickets	Rangana Herath (11)	Graeme Cremer (9)
- Player of the series: Rangana Herath (SL)

One Day International series
- Results: Zimbabwe won the 5-match series 3–2
Most runs	Danushka Gunathilaka (323)	Hamilton Masakadza (258)
Most wickets	Wanindu Hasaranga (8)	Tendai Chatara (6)
- Player of the series: Hamilton Masakadza (Zim)

The Zimbabwe cricket team toured Sri Lanka in June and July 2017 to play one Test match and five One Day Internationals (ODIs). Originally, the schedule was for two Test matches and three ODIs. It was Zimbabwe's first tour of Sri Lanka since January 2002. All the matches were played as day games.

Zimbabwe won the ODI series 3–2, their first ever series win against Sri Lanka. It was their first away series win since 2009 and the first away series win against a Test nation since defeating Bangladesh in 2001. It was also Zimbabwe's first win in a five-match series away from home. Zimbabwe's captain, Graeme Cremer, said the victory was "the pinnacle of my career". In contrast, Sri Lanka's captain, Angelo Mathews, said the defeat was "one of the lowest points in my career" and stepped down as captain of the team in all three formats the following day. Dinesh Chandimal was later named the new Test captain. Sri Lanka went on to win the one-off Test match by 4 wickets.

== Squads ==
Tests		ODIs	
Sri Lanka	Zimbabwe	Sri Lanka	Zimbabwe
Dinesh Chandimal (c, wk); Dushmantha Chameera; Niroshan Dickwella; Vishwa Fernando; Asela Gunaratne; Danushka Gunathilaka; Rangana Herath; Dimuth Karunaratne; Lahiru Kumara; Suranga Lakmal; Angelo Mathews; Kusal Mendis; Dilruwan Perera; Lakshan Sandakan; Upul Tharanga	Graeme Cremer (c); Ryan Burl; Regis Chakabva; Tendai Chatara; Craig Ervine; Hamilton Masakadza; Wellington Masakadza; Peter Moor (wk); Christopher Mpofu; Natsai Mushangwe; Carl Mumba; Tarisai Musakanda; Sikandar Raza; Donald Tiripano; Malcolm Waller; Nathan Waller; Sean Williams	Angelo Mathews (c); Amila Aponso; Dushmantha Chameera; Akila Dananjaya; Niroshan Dickwella (wk); Asitha Fernando; Asela Gunaratne; Danushka Gunathilaka; Wanindu Hasaranga; Chamara Kapugedera; Lahiru Madushanka; Lasith Malinga; Kusal Mendis; Nuwan Pradeep; Lakshan Sandakan; Upul Tharanga	Graeme Cremer (c); Ryan Burl; Tendai Chatara; Chamu Chibhabha; Craig Ervine; Hamilton Masakadza; Wellington Masakadza; Solomon Mire; Peter Moor (wk); Christopher Mpofu; Carl Mumba; Tarisai Musakanda; Richard Ngarava; Sikandar Raza; Donald Tiripano; Malcolm Waller; Sean Williams

== ODI series ==
=== 1st ODI ===
30 June 2017
Scorecard

Sri Lanka; 316/5 (50 overs)	v	Zimbabwe; 322/4 (47.4 overs)
Kusal Mendis 86 (80); Tendai Chatara 2/49 (9 overs)		Solomon Mire 112 (96); Asela Gunaratne 2/45 (7 overs)

Zimbabwe won by 6 wickets
Galle International Stadium, Galle
Umpires: Ian Gould (Eng) and Ruchira Palliyaguruge (SL)
Player of the match: Solomon Mire (Zim)

- Sri Lanka won the toss and elected to bat.
- Kusal Mendis became the joint second-fastest batsman for Sri Lanka to score 1,000 runs in ODIs.
- Solomon Mire (Zim) scored his first century in an ODI.
- This was Zimbabwe's first victory in any format in Sri Lanka against Sri Lanka.
- This was the highest successful run chase in Sri Lanka and the first successful run chase of a total more than 300 in Sri Lanka in an ODI.

=== 2nd ODI ===
2 July 2017
Scorecard

Zimbabwe; 155 (33.4 overs)	v	Sri Lanka; 158/3 (30.1 overs)
Hamilton Masakadza 41 (56); Lakshan Sandakan 4/52 (10 overs)		Upul Tharanga 75* (86); Tendai Chatara 2/33 (5 overs)

Sri Lanka won by 7 wickets
Galle International Stadium, Galle
Umpires: Nigel Llong (Eng) and Ruchira Palliyaguruge (SL)
Player of the match: Lakshan Sandakan (SL)

- Sri Lanka won the toss and elected to field.
- Wanindu Hasaranga (SL) made his ODI debut.
- Wanindu Hasaranga (SL) became the youngest bowler and first Sri Lankan bowler to take a hat-trick on debut in an ODI. He was also the first leg-spinner to take a hat-trick in an ODI.

=== 3rd ODI ===
6 July 2017
Scorecard

Zimbabwe; 310/8 (50 overs)	v	Sri Lanka; 312/2 (47.2 overs)
Hamilton Masakadza 111 (98); Wanindu Hasaranga 2/44 (7 overs)		Danushka Gunathilaka 116 (111); Malcolm Waller 1/32 (8 overs)

Sri Lanka won by 8 wickets
Mahinda Rajapaksa International Cricket Stadium, Hambantota
Umpires: Ian Gould (Eng) and Ranmore Martinesz (SL)
Player of the match: Danushka Gunathilaka (SL)

- Sri Lanka won the toss and elected to field.
- Niroshan Dickwella and Danushka Gunathilaka (SL) both scored their first centuries in an ODI.
- This was the highest successful run chase by Sri Lanka at home in an ODI.

=== 4th ODI ===
8 July 2017
Scorecard

Sri Lanka; 300/6 (50 overs)	v	Zimbabwe; 219/6 (29.2 overs)
Niroshan Dickwella 116 (118); Malcolm Waller 2/44 (10 overs)		Craig Ervine 69* (55); Wanindu Hasaranga 3/40 (6 overs)

Zimbabwe won by 4 wickets (DLS method)
Mahinda Rajapaksa International Cricket Stadium, Hambantota
Umpires: Nigel Llong (Eng) and Ranmore Martinesz (SL)
Player of the match: Craig Ervine (Zim)

- Sri Lanka won the toss and elected to bat.
- Rain during Zimbabwe's innings set them a revised total of 219 runs from 31 overs.
- Asitha Fernando (SL) made his ODI debut.
- Niroshan Dickwella and Danushka Gunathilaka (SL) became the first pair to make back-to-back double-century partnerships in ODIs.

=== 5th ODI ===
10 July 2017
Scorecard

Sri Lanka; 203/8 (50 overs)	v	Zimbabwe; 204/7 (38.1 overs)
Asela Gunaratne 59* (81); Sikandar Raza 3/21 (10 overs)		Hamilton Masakadza 73 (86); Akila Dananjaya 4/47 (10 overs)

Zimbabwe won by 3 wickets
Mahinda Rajapaksa International Cricket Stadium, Hambantota
Umpires: Ian Gould (Eng) and Raveendra Wimalasiri (SL)
Player of the match: Sikandar Raza (Zim)

- Zimbabwe won the toss and elected to field.
- This was Zimbabwe's first bilateral series win against Sri Lanka in ODIs.

== Test match ==
=== Only Test ===
14–18 July 2017
Scorecard

Zimbabwe	v	Sri Lanka
356 (94.4 overs); Craig Ervine 160 (256); Rangana Herath 5/116 (32 overs)		346 (102.3 overs); Upul Tharanga 71 (107); Graeme Cremer 5/125 (39.3 overs)
377 (107.1 overs); Sikandar Raza 127 (205); Rangana Herath 6/133 (39.1 overs)		391/6 (114.5 overs); Niroshan Dickwella 81 (118); Graeme Cremer 4/150 (48 overs)

Sri Lanka won by 4 wickets
R. Premadasa Stadium, Colombo
Umpires: Ian Gould (Eng) and Nigel Llong (Eng)
Player of the match: Asela Gunaratne (SL)

- Zimbabwe won the toss and elected to bat.
- Tarisai Musakanda (Zim) made his Test debut.
- Dinesh Chandimal played his first Test as captain of Sri Lanka.
- Zimbabwe's score of 344 on day 1 was most runs they had made in a single day of a Test.
- Rangana Herath (SL) became the fifth bowler to take 30 five-wicket hauls in Tests.
- Graeme Cremer (Zim) took his first five-wicket haul, becoming the first captain of Zimbabwe to take one in Tests.
- Sikandar Raza (Zim) made his first Test century.
- This was the highest successful run chase by any team in a Test in Asia, and the highest successful chase by Sri Lanka in Tests.
