= Andre Odendaal (Zimbabwean cricketer) =

Zimbabwean cricketer (born 1994)

Personal information
- Born: 14 October 1994 (age 32)
- Source: Cricinfo, 18 March 2021

Andre Odendaal (born 14 October 1994) is a Zimbabwean cricketer. He made his first-class debut on 18 March 2021, for Rocks, in the 2020–21 Logan Cup. Prior to his first-class debut, he was named in Zimbabwe's squad for the 2012 Under-19 Cricket World Cup. He made his Twenty20 debut on 11 April 2021, for Rocks, in the 2020–21 Zimbabwe Domestic Twenty20 Competition.
