= Daniel Hondo =

Zimbabwe international rugby union player & cricketer

Personal information
- Full name: Daniel Tendai Hondo
- Born: 8 March 1982 (age 44); Harare, Zimbabwe
- Batting: Right-handed
- Bowling: Right-arm fast-medium

Domestic team information
- Years: Team
- 2001/02: Mashonaland A

Career statistics
Competition	First-class
Matches	1
Runs scored	14
Batting average	14.00
100s/50s	0/0
Top score	7*
Balls bowled	12
Wickets	0
Bowling average	–
5 wickets in innings	–
10 wickets in match	–
Best bowling	–
Catches/stumpings	1/–
- Source: Cricinfo, 20 October 2012

Daniel Hondo
- Height: 1.77 m (5 ft 9 1/2 in)
- Weight: 97 kg (214 lb; 15 st 4 lb)

Rugby union career
- Position: Centre
Amateur team(s)
Years	Team	Apps	(Points)
- Harare Sports club,
International career
Years	Team	Apps	(Points)
2003-Present	Zimbabwe		
National sevens team
Years	Team		Comps
2003-2013	Zimbabwe		

Daniel Hondo (born 8 March 1982) is a former Zimbabwean rugby international and a cricketer. He was a right-handed batsman and a right-arm medium-fast bowler who played for Mashonaland A. He was born in Harare. He played rugby union as a centre for Zimbabwe and was captain.

== Cricket career ==
Hondo made a single first-class appearance, during the 2001-02 Logan Cup, against Midlands. He scored 7 not out from the lower order in the first innings in which he batted, and seven from the opening order in the second innings. Hondo bowled two overs during the match, conceding 21 runs.

In December 2020, he was selected to play for the Southern Rocks in the 2020–21 Logan Cup.

== Rugby career ==
Hondo turned to Rugby in adult life (a Sport he played alongside cricket at Churchill Boys High), and was the captain of the Zimbabwe rugby team.

He grew up playing rugby and cricket alongside his older brothers, Donald and Douglas (former Zimbabwe Test cricketer).

Although he represented Zimbabwe at age-group level in cricket, Daniel is better known as a rugby player, forming a formidable centre-pairing at Harare Sports Club with Zimbabwe rugby great John Ewing in his early 20s.

He was awarded a rugby scholarship at Hartpury College in the UK, where he excelled under Zimbabwean-born coach Liam Middleton, representing the British Universities Select Side (also coached by Middleton).

Upon graduation, he returned home to Zimbabwe to re-launch his professional career. He played for Harare Sports Club, where he was player coach before retiring. Hondo has been the Coach for Harare Sports Club Rugby ever since. Hondo was and later became Head Coach 2015-2016 for tha National 7s Team, The Cheetahs. In his tenure the team were seconds away from Qualifying into the World 7s circuit in Hong Kong (2015) and in that same year seconds away from qualifying for the Olympics. He also was the assistant coach for the Zimbabwe 7s Sables team, As a player he represented the Cheetahs (Zimbabwe National 7s Team) with distinction on the IRB Sevens Circuit. Hondo has since retired from all forms of playing rugby and has turned his efforts into Coaching. Currently coaching at Hellenic Academy.
