= Brighton Zhawi =

Zimbabwean cricketer (born 1992)

Personal information
- Born: 20 April 1992 (age 34); Harare, Zimbabwe
- Source: Cricinfo, 25 May 2017

Brighton Zhawi (born 20 April 1992) is a Zimbabwean cricketer. He made his List A debut for Mashonaland Eagles in the 2015–16 Pro50 Championship on 4 November 2015. He was the leading wicket-taker for Mashonaland Eagles in the 2017–18 Pro50 Championship tournament, with fourteen dismissals in eight matches. In December 2020, he was selected to play for the Eagles in the 2020–21 Logan Cup. He made his first-class debut on 27 October 2021, for Eagles in the 2021–22 Logan Cup.
