= Tafara Chingwara =

Zimbabwean cricketer (born 1987)

Personal information
- Born: 12 December 1987 (age 38)
- Source: Cricinfo, 6 May 2017

Tafara Chingwara (born 12 December 1987) is a Zimbabwean cricketer. He made his first-class debut for Mid West Rhinos in the 2016–17 Logan Cup on 6 May 2017. In December 2020, he was selected to play for the Rhinos in the 2020–21 Logan Cup.
