= Frank Mwazviita =

Zimbabwean cricketer (born 1998)

Personal information
- Born: 9 November 1998 (age 28)
- Source: Cricinfo, 18 March 2021

Frank Mwazviita (born 9 November 1998) is a Zimbabwean cricketer. He made his first-class debut on 18 March 2021, for Mountaineers, in the 2020–21 Logan Cup. Prior to his first-class debut, Mwazviita had also played for the Zimbabwe national under-19 cricket team at international level. He made his List A debut on 14 January 2022, for Mountaineers in the 2021–22 Pro50 Championship.
