= Charles Kunje =

Zimbabwean cricketer (born 1994)

Personal information
- Born: 27 May 1994 (age 32); Harare, Zimbabwe
- Batting: Right-handed
- Source: ESPNcricinfo, 6 April 2019

Charles Kunje (born 27 May 1994) is a Zimbabwean cricketer. He made his Twenty20 debut for Matabeleland Tuskers in the 2018–19 Stanbic Bank 20 Series on 11 March 2019. In December 2020, he was selected to play for the Rhinos in the 2020–21 Logan Cup.
