= Remembrance Nyathi =

Zimbabwean cricketer (born 1986)

Personal information
- Born: 10 December 1986 (age 39); Bulawayo, Zimbabwe
- Source: ESPNcricinfo, 24 February 2017

Remembrance Nyathi (born 10 December 1986) is a Zimbabwean cricketer. He made his first-class debut for Centrals cricket team in the 2006–07 Logan Cup on 12 April 2007. In December 2020, he was selected to play for the Rhinos in the 2020–21 Logan Cup.
