= Nkosilathi Nungu =

Zimbabwean cricketer (born 2001)

Personal information
- Born: 12 February 2001 (age 25)
- Source: Cricinfo, 24 April 2021

Nkosilathi Nungu (born 12 February 2001) is a Zimbabwean cricketer. In December 2020, he was named in the Rocks' squad for the 2020–21 Logan Cup. He made his List A debut on 24 April 2021, for Rocks, in the 2020–21 Pro50 Championship. Prior to his List A debut, he was named in Zimbabwe's squad for the 2018 Under-19 Cricket World Cup. He made his first-class debut on 12 February 2022, for Rocks in the 2021–22 Logan Cup in Zimbabwe.
