= John Nyumbu =

Zimbabwean cricketer (born 1985)

Personal information
- Born: 31 May 1985 (age 41); Bulawayo, Zimbabwe
- Batting: Right-handed
- Bowling: Right arm off break
- Role: Bowler

International information
- National side: Zimbabwe
- Test debut (cap 91): 9 August 2014 v South Africa
- Last Test: 6 August 2016 v New Zealand
- ODI debut (cap 122): 17 August 2014 v South Africa
- Last ODI: 29 August 2014 v South Africa
- Only T20I (cap 50): 1 July 2018 v Pakistan

Domestic team information
- Years: Team
- 2003/04: Matabeleland
- 2006-2009: Westerns
- 2009-: Matabeleland Tuskers

Career statistics
Competition	Test	ODI	FC	LA
Matches	1	5	47	50
Runs scored	15	20	725	136
Batting average	7.50	5.00	13.67	8.50
100s/50s	0/0	0/0	0/2	0/0
Top score	13	18	65	24
Balls bowled	321	235	7,747	2,218
Wickets	5	8	127	51
Bowling average	36.20	29.37	30.66	32.84
5 wickets in innings	1	0	7	0
10 wickets in match	0	0	0	0
Best bowling	5/157	3/42	6/59	4/45
Catches/stumpings	0/–	2/–	54/–	27/–
- Source: Cricinfo, 29 August 2014

John Nyumbu (born 31 May 1985) is a Zimbabwean cricketer. He is a right-handed tail-ended batsman and right arm off break bowler.

== Career ==
He made his Test cricket debut for Zimbabwe against South Africa at Harare Sports Club in August 2014 in which he took five wickets in the first innings and became second Zimbabwean cricketer after Andy Blignaut. He made his One Day International debut later that same month, also against South Africa.

In May 2018, he took his 200th first-class wicket in his 73rd first-class match. He was the leading wicket-taker for Matabeleland Tuskers in the 2017–18 Pro50 Championship tournament, with eleven dismissals in eight matches.

In June 2018, he was named in a Board XI team for warm-up fixtures ahead of the 2018 Zimbabwe Tri-Nation Series. Later the same month, he was named in a 22-man preliminary Twenty20 International (T20I) squad for the tri-nation series. He made his T20I debut for Zimabwbe against Pakistan on 1 July 2018, during the tri-series.

In December 2020, he was selected to play for the Tuskers in the 2020–21 Logan Cup.
