= Keith Jaure =

Zimbabwean cricketer (born 1998)

Personal information
- Full name: Kuzivakwashe Keith Jaure
- Born: 2 March 1998 (age 28); Harare, Zimbabwe
- Batting: Left-handed
- Bowling: Left-arm medium-fast
- Source: Cricinfo, 15 September 2017

Keith Jaure (born 2 March 1998) is a Zimbabwean cricketer. He made his Twenty20 debut for Zimbabwe in the 2017 Africa T20 Cup on 15 September 2017. He made his List A debut for Mashonaland Eagles in the 2018–19 Pro50 Championship on 12 December 2018. He made his first-class debut for Mashonaland Eagles in the 2018–19 Logan Cup on 4 February 2019.

In December 2020, he was selected to play for the Eagles in the 2020–21 Logan Cup.
