= John Masara =

Zimbabwean cricketer (born 1991)

Personal information
- Full name: John Kumbirai Masara
- Born: 16 August 1991 (age 35); Mutare, Zimbabwe
- Batting: Right-handed
- Bowling: Right-arm leg break
- Role: Bowler

International information
- National side: Zimbabwe
- Only T20I (cap 71): 2 August 2022 v Bangladesh
- Source: Cricinfo, 2 August 2022

John Masara (born 16 August 1991) is a Zimbabwean cricketer. He made his first-class debut for Mountaineers in the 2017–18 Logan Cup on 6 November 2017. In December 2020, he was selected to play for the Mountaineers in the 2020–21 Logan Cup. He made his List A debut on 18 April 2021, for Mountaineers, in the 2020–21 Pro50 Championship. In July 2022, he was named in Zimbabwe's T20I squad, for their series against Bangladesh. He made his T20I debut on 2 August 2022, for Zimbabwe against Bangladesh.
