= Taffy Mupariwa =

Zimbabwean cricketer (born 1996)

Personal information
- Full name: Tafara Rodwell Mupariwa
- Born: 3 April 1996 (age 30); Bulawayo, Zimbabwe
- Source: ESPNcricinfo, 17 February 2017

Taffy Mupariwa (born 3 April 1996) is a Zimbabwean cricketer. He made his first-class debut for Matabeleland Tuskers in the 2014–15 Logan Cup on 15 February 2015. In February 2017, he was named in an academy squad by Zimbabwe Cricket to tour England later that year.
