= Tapiwa Mufudza =

Zimbabwean cricketer

Personal information
- Born: 20 September 1990 (age 36); Harare, Zimbabwe
- Batting: Right-handed
- Bowling: Right-arm off-spin
- Role: Bowler

International information
- National side: Zimbabwe
- ODI debut (cap 156): 6 January 2024 v Sri Lanka
- Last ODI: 8 January 2024 v Sri Lanka

Domestic team information
- Years: Team
- 2011/12–2015/16: Mountaineers
- 2017/18–: Eagles

Career statistics
| Competition | ODI | FC | LA | T20 |
|---|---|---|---|---|
| Matches | 2 | 63 | 86 | 34 |
| Runs scored | 1 | 889 | 464 | 47 |
| Batting average | 1.00 | 11.69 | 11.31 | 11.75 |
| 100s/50s | 0/0 | 0/1 | 0/0 | 0/0 |
| Top score | 1 | 54 | 36 | 9 |
| Balls bowled | 102 | 12,203 | 4,263 | 727 |
| Wickets | 0 | 190 | 119 | 38 |
| Bowling average | – | 30.28 | 25.06 | 22.71 |
| 5 wickets in innings | 0 | 7 | 1 | 1 |
| 10 wickets in match | – | 1 | 0 | 0 |
| Best bowling | – | 7/31 | 5/25 | 5/20 |
| Catches/stumpings | 0/– | 22/– | 25/– | 5/– |
- Source: Cricinfo, 25 May 2025

Tapiwa Mufudza (born 20 September 1990) is a Zimbabwean cricketer.

Mufudza has been an off-spinner since he took up the game at Mbizi Primary School in Highfield, Harare. He played for the Takashinga Cricket Club in Harare before being recruited by Mountaineers.

He played his first matches for Mountaineers in 2011–12, and established himself in the side in 2012–13, when he took 13 wickets at an average of 14.92 to lead the national first-class bowling averages. In the Logan Cup match against Southern Rocks he scored 39 batting at number 10, then took 2 for 46 and 5 for 27 in a 116-run victory. In the Zimbabwean T20 competition final against Mashonaland Eagles he opened the bowling and took 4 for 14. Mountaineers won the match and he won the man of the match award.

He played for Cookham Dean in the Thames Valley Cricket League in 2014, taking 80 wickets at an average of 14.86 and making 499 runs at 27.72.

In the Logan Cup in December 2014, Mufudza took 7 for 31 in the second innings against Mid West Rhinos, including the first six wickets to fall, to ensure victory for Mountaineers. In January 2015 he played two 50-over matches for Zimbabwe A against Canada, taking two wickets for 56 runs in 20 overs. Later that month, opening the bowling in a List A match against Mashonaland Eagles, he took 4 for 28. In December 2020, Mufudza was selected to play for the Eagles in the 2020–21 Logan Cup.

In April 2021, he was named in Zimbabwe's squad for their Twenty20 International (T20I) series against Pakistan. He played two One Day Internationals on Zimbabwe's tour of Sri Lanka in 2023–24, but did not take a wicket.
