= Tarisai Musakanda =

Zimbabwean cricketer (born 1994)

Personal information
- Full name: Tarisai Musakanda
- Born: 31 October 1994 (age 32); Masvingo, Zimbabwe
- Batting: Right-handed
- Role: Top-order batsman

International information
- National side: Zimbabwe (2016–)
- Test debut (cap 101): 14 July 2017 v Sri Lanka
- Last Test: 7 May 2021 v Pakistan
- ODI debut (cap 131): 27 November 2016 v Sri Lanka
- Last ODI: 5 August 2022 v Bangladesh
- ODI shirt no.: 31
- T20I debut (cap 49): 1 July 2018 v Pakistan
- Last T20I: 25 July 2021 v Bangladesh

Career statistics
Competition	Test	ODI	T20I	FC
Matches	5	15	12	37
Runs scored	134	304	197	1,768
Batting average	14.88	21.71	16.41	27.20
100s/50s	0/0	0/1	0/0	2/12
Top score	43	60	43	119
Catches/stumpings	4/–	11/0	6/–	45/0
- Source: ESPNcricinfo, 5 August 2022

Tarisai Musakanda (born 31 October 1994) is a Zimbabwean cricketer who plays for the national cricket team. He was part of Zimbabwe's squad for the 2014 ICC Under-19 Cricket World Cup.

== Domestic career ==
He was educated at Watershed College. He made both his List A and his first-class debut in 2014.

In December 2018, during the opening round of the 2018–19 Logan Cup, Musakanda scored his maiden century in first-class cricket. In December 2020, he was named as the captain of the Rhinos for the 2020–21 Logan Cup.

== International career ==
In October 2016, he was included in Zimbabwe's Test squad for their series against Sri Lanka. The following month he was included in Zimbabwe's One Day International (ODI) squad for the tri-series against Sri Lanka and the West Indies. He made his ODI debut in the final of the tri-series against Sri Lanka.

In February 2017, he was named in an academy squad by Zimbabwe Cricket to tour England later that year. He made his Test debut for Zimbabwe against Sri Lanka in their one-off Test in Colombo on 14 July 2017.

In June 2018, he was named in a Zimbabwe Select team for warm-up fixtures ahead of the 2018 Zimbabwe Tri-Nation Series. Later the same month, he was named in a 22-man preliminary Twenty20 International (T20I) squad for the tri-nation series. He made his T20I debut for Zimbabwe against Pakistan on 1 July 2018, during the tri-series.

In September 2018, he was named as the captain of Zimbabwe's squad for the 2018 Africa T20 Cup tournament. He was the leading run-scorer for Zimbabwe in the tournament, with 182 runs in four matches.

== Personal life ==
In February 2022, Musakanda was charged with culpable homicide after failing to report a road accident in which a pedestrian was killed. The pedestrian was later identified as Gwinyai Chingoka, a Zimbabwean tennis player who had represented Zimbabwe at the Davis Cup. Musakanda was convicted in August 2022 and fined 30,000 Zimbabwean dollars. The judge said he had failed to take proper care while driving, since it was dark and raining, while the victim was wearing dark colours.
