= Kudzai Maunze =

Zimbabwean cricketer (born 1991)

Personal information
- Full name: Kudzai Oliver Maunze
- Born: 10 April 1991 (age 35); Harare, Zimbabwe
- Batting: Right-handed
- Bowling: Right-arm offbreak
- Source: ESPNcricinfo, 12 February 2023

Kudzai Maunze (born 10 April 1991) is a Zimbabwean first-class cricketer. In December 2020, he was selected to play for the Eagles in the 2020–21 Logan Cup.
