= Prince Masvaure =

Zimbabwean cricketer (born 1988)

Personal information
- Full name: Prince Spencer Masvaure
- Born: 7 October 1988 (age 38); Bulawayo, Zimbabwe
- Batting: Left-handed
- Role: Batter

International information
- National side: Zimbabwe (2016–2024)
- Test debut (cap 98): 28 July 2016 v New Zealand
- Last Test: 25 July 2024 v Ireland
- ODI debut (cap 137): 18 July 2018 v Pakistan
- Last ODI: 22 July 2018 v Pakistan

Career statistics
Competition	Test	ODI	FC	LA
Matches	9	2	120	114
Runs scored	432	40	5,790	2,835
Batting average	27.00	20.00	29.39	27.25
100s/50s	0/4	0/0	9/34	1/16
Top score	74	39	166	100
Balls bowled	84	18	5,786	1,861
Wickets	0	0	85	44
Bowling average	-	-	38.78	34.45
5 wickets in innings	0	0	0	0
10 wickets in match	0	0	0	0
Best bowling	-	-	4/28	3/22
Catches/stumpings	2/-	0/-	66/-	34/-
- Source: Cricinfo, 12 April 2025

Prince Spencer Masvaure (born 7 October 1988) is a Zimbabwean first-class cricketer. In July 2016, he was named in Zimbabwe's Test squad for their series against New Zealand. On 28 July 2016, he made his Test debut against New Zealand.

He was the leading run-scorer for Mid West Rhinos in the 2017–18 Pro50 Championship tournament, with 271 runs in eight matches.

In June 2018, he was named in a Board XI team for warm-up fixtures ahead of the 2018 Zimbabwe Tri-Nation Series. Later the same month, he was named in a 22-man preliminary Twenty20 International (T20I) squad for the tri-nation series. He made his One Day International (ODI) debut for Zimbabwe against Pakistan on 18 July 2018.

In December 2020, he was selected to play for the Rhinos in the 2020–21 Logan Cup. In January 2022, during the 2021–22 Logan Cup, Masvaure played in his 100th first-class match.
