= Takudzwanashe Kaitano =

Zimbabwean cricketer

Personal information
- Born: 15 June 1993 (age 33); Kadoma, Zimbabwe
- Batting: Right handed
- Bowling: Right arm off break
- Role: Opening batter

International information
- National side: Zimbabwe (2021–present)
- Test debut (cap 119): 7 July 2021 v Bangladesh
- Last Test: 6 February 2025 v Ireland
- ODI debut (cap 146): 16 January 2022 v Sri Lanka
- Last ODI: 11 January 2025 v Sri Lanka
- ODI shirt no.: 83

Domestic team information
- Years: Team
- 2017–present: Mid West Rhinos

Career statistics
Competition	Test	ODI	FC	LA
Matches	4	11	54	68
Runs scored	206	157	2429	1831
Batting average	25.75	15.70	26.11	28.16
100s/50s	0/1	0/0	3/13	1/9
Top score	87	42	139	122
Balls bowled	0	0	89	0
Wickets	0	0	2	0
Bowling average	–	–	32.50	–
5 wickets in innings	0	0	0	0
10 wickets in match	0	–	0	–
Best bowling	–	–	1/4	–
Catches/stumpings	5/–	2/–	46/–	26/–
- Source: Cricinfo, 3 April 2025

Takudzwanashe Kaitano (born 15 June 1993) is a Zimbabwean cricketer. He made his international debut for the Zimbabwe cricket team in July 2021.

== Career ==
Kaitano made his first-class debut for Mid West Rhinos in the 2016–17 Logan Cup on 21 February 2017. He made his List A debut for Mid West Rhinos in the 2017–18 Pro50 Championship on 23 May 2018. In December 2020, he was selected to play for the Rhinos in the 2020–21 Logan Cup.

He made his Twenty20 debut on 13 April 2021, for Rhinos, in the 2020–21 Zimbabwe Domestic Twenty20 Competition. Later the same month, he was named as a standby player for Zimbabwe's Test matches against Pakistan.

In July 2021, Kaitano was named in Zimbabwe's Test squad for their one-off match against Bangladesh. He made his Test debut on 7 July 2021, for Zimbabwe against Bangladesh. In the first innings, he scored 87 runs, the highest score by an opener for Zimbabwe on his Test debut.

In January 2022, Kaitano was named in Zimbabwe's One Day International (ODI) squad for their series against Sri Lanka. He made his ODI debut on 16 January 2022, for Zimbabwe against Sri Lanka.
