= Ainsley Ndlovu =

Zimbabwean cricketer (born 1996)

Personal information
- Born: 26 January 1996 (age 30); Bulawayo, Zimbabwe
- Batting: Right-handed
- Bowling: Slow left-arm orthodox
- Role: Bowler

International information
- National side: Zimbabwe (2017-present)
- Test debut (cap 110): 19 January 2020 v Sri Lanka
- Last Test: 22 February 2020 v Bangladesh
- ODI debut (cap 140): 19 June 2019 v Netherlands
- Last ODI: 21 June 2019 v Netherlands
- T20I debut (cap 53): 14 September 2019 v Afghanistan
- Last T20I: 30 October 2023 v Namibia
- T20I shirt no.: 26
- Source: Cricinfo, 26 June 2022

Ainsley Ndlovu (born 26 January 1996) is a Zimbabwean cricketer. He made his international debut for the Zimbabwe cricket team in June 2019.

== Domestic career ==
He made his first-class debut for Matabeleland Tuskers in the 2014–15 Logan Cup on 8 February 2015. He made his Twenty20 debut for Zimbabwe in the 2017 Africa T20 Cup on 15 September 2017. In December 2020, he was selected to play for the Tuskers in the 2020–21 Logan Cup.

== International career ==
In April 2019, he was named in Zimbabwe's One Day International (ODI) squad for their series against the United Arab Emirates, but he did not play. In June 2019, he was named in Zimbabwe's squad for their series against the Netherlands. He made his ODI debut for Zimbabwe against the Netherlands on 19 June 2019. He became the 26th bowler to take a wicket with his first delivery in an ODI match, when he dismissed Tobias Visee.

In September 2019, he was named in Zimbabwe's Twenty20 International (T20I) squad for the 2019–20 Bangladesh Tri-Nation Series. He made his T20I debut for Zimbabwe, against Afghanistan, on 14 September 2019.

In January 2020, he was named in Zimbabwe's Test squad for their series against Sri Lanka. He made his Test debut for Zimbabwe, against Sri Lanka, on 19 January 2020.
