= Carl Mumba =

Zimbabwean cricketer

Personal information
- Full name: Carl Tapfuma Mumba
- Born: 6 May 1995 (age 31); Kwekwe, Zimbabwe
- Batting: Right-handed
- Bowling: Right-arm fast-medium
- Role: Bowler

International information
- National side: Zimbabwe (2016-present)
- Test debut (cap 100): 29 October 2016 v Sri Lanka
- Last Test: 27 January 2020 v Sri Lanka
- ODI debut (cap 130): 14 November 2016 v Sri Lanka
- Last ODI: 1 November 2020 v Pakistan
- T20I debut (cap 60): 9 March 2020 v Bangladesh
- Last T20I: 11 March 2020 v Bangladesh

Domestic team information
- Years: Team
- Mid West Rhinos

Career statistics
| Competition | Test | ODI | T20I |
|---|---|---|---|
| Matches | 3 | 7 | 2 |
| Runs scored | 25 | 32 | 26 |
| Batting average | 8.33 | 8.00 | 26.00 |
| 100s/50s | 0/0 | 0/0 | 0/0 |
| Top score | 11* | 13 | 25 |
| Balls bowled | 599 | 272 | 30 |
| Wickets | 10 | 7 | 0 |
| Bowling average | 35.40 | 46.57 | – |
| 5 wickets in innings | 0 | 0 | 0 |
| 10 wickets in match | 0 | 0 | 0 |
| Best bowling | 4/50 | 3/69 | – |
| Catches/stumpings | 2/- | 1/- | 0/- |
- Source: ESPNcricinfo, 1 November 2020

Carl Mumba (born 6 May 1995) is a Zimbabwean cricketer who plays for Mid West Rhinos. He made his Test cricket debut for the Zimbabwe cricket team in October 2016.

== Domestic career ==
In December 2018, during the opening round of the 2018–19 Logan Cup, Mumba took six wickets for seven runs in the second innings against Mountaineers. These were the best figures for a bowler taking six wickets in a first-class cricket match in Zimbabwe.

He made his Twenty20 debut for Mid West Rhinos in the 2018–19 Stanbic Bank 20 Series on 13 March 2019. In December 2020, he was selected to play for the Rhinos in the 2020–21 Logan Cup.

== International career ==
In October 2016, he was included in Zimbabwe's Test squad for their series against Sri Lanka. He made his Test debut against Sri Lanka on 29 October 2016, becoming the 100th player to represent Zimbabwe in Tests. The following month he was included in Zimbabwe's One Day International (ODI) squad for the tri-series against Sri Lanka and the West Indies. He made his ODI debut in the first match of the tri-series, against Sri Lanka.

In February 2017, he was named in an academy squad by Zimbabwe Cricket to tour England later that year. In February 2020, he was named in Zimbabwe's Twenty20 International (T20I) squad for their series against Bangladesh. He made his T20I debut against Bangladesh, on 9 March 2020.
