= Forster Mutizwa =

Zimbabwean cricketer and umpire

Personal information
- Full name: Forster Mutizwa
- Born: 24 August 1985 (age 41); Harare, Zimbabwe
- Batting: Right-handed
- Bowling: Right-arm off-break
- Role: Wicket-keeper, Umpire

International information
- National side: Zimbabwe
- Only Test (cap 84): 26 January 2012 v New Zealand
- ODI debut (cap 104): 27 January 2009 v Kenya
- Last ODI: 25 October 2011 v New Zealand
- T20I debut (cap 29): 15 October 2011 v New Zealand
- Last T20I: 11 February 2012 v New Zealand

Domestic team information
- Years: Team
- 2004/05–2005/06; 2016/17–2017/18: Manicaland
- 2006/07–2009: Easterns
- 2009/10–2012/13: Mashonaland Eagles
- 2013/14–2018/19: Mountaineers

Umpiring information
- ODIs umpired: 7 (2022–2025)
- T20Is umpired: 49 (2021–2025)
- WODIs umpired: 1 (2024)
- WT20Is umpired: 17 (2021–2025)

Career statistics
Competition	Test	ODI	T20I	FC
Matches	1	17	3	98
Runs scored	24	403	38	5,524
Batting average	12.00	31.00	12.66	38.62
100s/50s	0/0	0/4	0/0	14/25
Top score	18	79	22	190
Balls bowled	0	0	0	197
Wickets	0	0	0	2
Bowling average	–	–	–	54.00
5 wickets in innings	0	0	0	0
10 wickets in match	0	0	0	0
Best bowling	–	–	–	2/18
Catches/stumpings	0/0	9/2	0/0	193/16
- Source: ESPNcricinfo, 23 March 2023

Forster Mutizwa (born 24 August 1985) is a Zimbabwean cricket umpire and former cricketer. He played as a right-handed lower middle-order batsman and wicket-keeper.

== Playing career ==
He was first called up to the national team for a tour of Bangladesh but did not feature in a match. He made his international debut in a One Day International (ODI) against Kenya on 27 January 2009. He had featured in a lone Test for Zimbabwe against New Zealand in January 2012. In December 2019, he quit playing cricket to become an umpire.

== Umpiring career ==
On 23 July 2021, he stood in his first Twenty20 International (T20I) match, between Zimbabwe and Bangladesh. On 7 August 2022, he made his ODI umpiring debut in a match between Zimbabwe and Bangladesh. As of March 2023, he had officiated in 3 ODI and 24 T20I matches, including two women's T20Is.

== See also ==
- List of Twenty20 International cricket umpires
