= Takashinga Cricket Club =

Cricket club

- Interactive map of Takashinga Cricket Club

Ground information
- Location: Harare, Zimbabwe
- Country: Zimbabwe
- Coordinates: 17.888°S 30.991°E
- Establishment: 1990

International information
- First men's ODI: 18 June 2023: West Indies v United States
- Last men's ODI: 6 July 2023: United Arab Emirates v United States
- First men's T20I: 26 September 2025: Malawi v Nigeria
- Last men's T20I: 4 October 2025: Nigeria v Uganda
- First women's T20I: 5 May 2019: Kenya v Namibia
- Last women's T20I: 30 August 2021: Zimbabwe v Thailand
- As of 6 July 2023; Source: ESPN Cricinfo

Takashinga Cricket Club is a cricket club in Highfield, Harare. Some of its famous members include Zimbabwe national cricket team captains Andy Flower and Tatenda Taibu. The club's ground is located at the Zimbabwe grounds in the Highfield. As of 2007–08, it is one of the strongest cricket clubs in Zimbabwe.

== History ==
The club was created in 1990 when Givemore Makoni and Stephen Mangongo decided they wanted to start a cricket club. The two looked for a place to call home, when after a long search, Churchill High School offered their facilities. Part of the arrangement, was that the club would be called Old Winstonians.

In 2001, the name was changed from Old Winstonians to Takashinga. By that point, a home base had been set up in the Highfields. Bill Flower, father of Andy Flower supported the early members of Takashinga. Givemore Makoni told Cricinfo, "We have changed the name to identify with ourselves and our community. We are a black club, and 'Winstonians' does not identify with us in any way. 'Takashinga' means we are brave and we will fight all the way. This symbolizes the black people of Zimbabwe who are no quitters at anything they set their mind on."

The cricket club was officially opened in 2003 by West Indian cricketer Brian Lara, whose team was on tour and using Takashinga as a practice venue. A plaque recognizing the moment was hung at the Takashinga's club house.

== International Cricket ==
Takashinga Cricket Club was one of the venues for the 2023 Cricket World Cup Qualifier. All matches in the tournament had One Day International (ODI) status. Takashinga hosted its first ever ODI on 18 June 2023, when West Indies played USA in the second match of the Qualifier tournament.

In November 2025, Takashinga Cricket Club was announced as the venue for seven group-stage matches of the 2026 U19 Men's Cricket World Cup.

=== ODI Records ===
- Highest total: 374/6 (by (Cricket West Indies) West Indies) and 374/9 (by Netherlands), 26 June 2023
- Lowest total: 167 (by Nepal), against Netherlands, 24 June 2023
- Highest score: 151* by (United Arab Emirates) Asif Khan, against United States, 6 July 2023
- Best bowling: 4/24 by (Netherlands) Logan Van Beek, against Nepal, 24 June 2023
- Most runs: (United States) Shayan Jahangir - 242 (4 innings)
- Most wickets: (Nepal) Karan KC - 11 (4 innings)

=== List of One Day International Centuries at Takashinga ===
Five ODI centuries have been scored at Takashinga.

No.	Score	Player	Team	Opposing team	Date	Result	Ref
1	101*	Gajanand Singh	United States	West Indies	18 June 2023	Lost	
2	100*	Shayan Jahangir	United States	Nepal	20 June 2023	Lost	
3	104*	Nicholas Pooran	West Indies	Netherlands	26 June 2023	Tied (Netherlands won the super over)	
4	111	Teja Nidamanuru	Netherlands	West Indies	26 June 2023	Tied (Netherlands won the super over)	
5	151*	Asif Khan	United Arab Emirates	United States	6 July 2023	Won	
