= Mid West Rhinos =

Zimbabwean cricket team

Personnel
- Captain: Prince Masvaure (FC & List A); Antum Naqvi (T20)
- Coach: Adam Chifo

Team information
- Founded: 2009
- Home ground: Kwekwe Sports Club, Kwekwe
- Capacity: 1,400

History
- First-class debut: Matabeleland Tuskers in 2009-10 at Kwekwe Sports Club
- Pro50 Championship wins: 1
- Zimbabwe Domestic Twenty20 Competition wins: 1
- Official website: Midwest Rhinos

The Mid West Rhinos is one of the five cricket Zimbabwean cricket franchises. They are a first-class cricket team, based in Midlands Province and the Mashonaland West area. They play their home matches at Kwekwe Sports Club in Kwekwe.

== History ==
In 2009, Zimbabwe Cricket announced a major restructure of domestic cricket in Zimbabwe and the traditional provincial sides were replaced with regional franchises. Midlands was renamed Mid West Rhinos and based in the mining town of Kwekwe. With the new franchise system in place the season got under way on 14 September 2009. Current captain Vusimuzi Sibanda was the first person to score a hundred under the new 'Mid West Rhinos' name as they convincingly beat the newly titled Matabeleland Tuskers by 135 runs. Sadly for the Rhinos, the season ended in a tense draw that saw the Mashonaland Eagles triumph narrowly.

The 2010/11 season was a promising for the Rhinos as they retained the services of a number of top Zimbabwe players. Once again, they failed to win any trophies despite winning 4 games and losing only 2 in the newly branded Castle Logan Cup. Throughout the following seasons, the Rhinos have had many successes but failed to win any trophies.

Despite a delay to the start of the 2014/15 season, the season began with the Mid West Rhinos tipped to be one of the stronger sides in both the four-day and one-day competitions. However, amid off-field issues affecting both the Rhinos and Zimbabwean cricket as a whole, the first part of the season saw mixed results. The only win for the Rhinos in the Logan Cup before Christmas came as a result of a poor performance by the Mashonaland Eagles in the season opener. After the Christmas break, the Rhinos showed some strong performances, bolstered by Vusi Sibanda and Malcolm Waller, both of whom did not travel to the 2015 World Cup, but the One Day performances were abysmal. At the end of the season, the Rhinos won just 2 Pro50 matches but finished 2nd to Tuskers in the Logan Cup by only 3 points.

== Ground facilities ==
=== History ===
Kwekwe Sports Club has hosted cricket since 1952. The ground has been developed into one of the finest cricketing venues in the country and has hosted First Class cricket since 1999. The one and only One Day International at the ground was played on 11 December 2002 between Zimbabwe and Kenya which Zimbabwe won by 47 runs. The ground has however played host to a number of touring teams including West Indies, Australia, South Africa and Bangladesh.

=== Facilities ===
The Kwekwe Sports Club square has space for 5 pitches, the centre of which is used only for First Class games. The dimensions of the playing field vary depending on the game being played. For First Class games, the boundary extends to 75 yards straight down on the pitch and 71 yards square of the wicket. The boundaries are reduced for List A, Twenty20 and club cricket.

The practice facilities at the ground are among the best in the country. There are 16 grass nets used for practice that run in an unusual east–west direction. There are also 3 artificial turf nets that are used primarily for throw downs and training on bowling machines.

== Ongoing projects within the community ==
The Mid West Rhinos have been engaged in several projects within the surrounding community.

=== Midlands Black Rhino Conservancy ===
The Mid West Rhinos maintain close links with the Midlands Black Rhino Conservancy. The conservancy is made up of several adjoining farms that give free rein to a number of the severely endangered Black Rhino. Each year the Mid West Rhinos stage the Midlands Black Rhino Conservancy T20 tournament. The tournament has grown from humble beginnings and now boasts participating teams from South Africa and Zambia. The proceeds from the tournament and other fundraising activities go directly to the conservancy.

=== Mbizo Cricket Centre ===
The largest venture by the Mid West Rhinos is the ongoing Mbizo Cricket centre project. Aimed at developing cricket in the underprivileged high density suburb of Mbizo, the cricket centre was part funded by the Australian Embassy and Indian auto mobile manufacturer Mahindra. The project has been vital in increasing awareness and knowledge of cricket in the area and has resulted in producing a number of decent cricketers. The project stalled in 2014 but in 2015, the Australian Embassy and prominent businessmen John and Charles Gardiner of the Cold Chain Group provided funds to complement the existing facilities with a large pavilion. Still under construction, the pavilion will include changing rooms, kitchen, running water, electricity and meeting areas.

Whilst the project was slow to gain ground, the support from the local community was immense. When club cricket was played at the centre it would not be unusual to see 60 players arriving on match day vying for a place on the team. Many of the cricketers who played for Mbizo have gone on to represent other local league teams and some have even appeared for the Rhinos.

=== League Cricket ===
The Mid West Rhinos are solely responsible for all cricketing activity within the region. As part of their efforts to develop the game the Rhinos introduced a league. The league includes the teams;

- Kwekwe Cricket Club
- Kwekwe Queens Cricket Club
- Gweru
- Chegutu
- Chinoyi
- Kadoma
- Redcliffe Cricket Club
- Norton Cricket Club

The strongest of the sides is Kwekwe Cricket Club who consistently beat their opposition convincingly. Whilst League cricket in the area faces numerous difficulties due to the lagging local economy, the standard of cricket is fairly high with a number of the clubs fielding professional players.

=== Street Cricket ===
The Mid West Rhinos are embarking on another project to bring "Street Cricket" to the suburb of Mbizo. The project which was started by Sporting Chance aims to give young people an opportunity to play a simple version of cricket within their community. Street Cricket can be played with just a bat and ball and it is hoped that by operating this project, the young people will be able to learn new skills and will encourage them to take up the full version of the game.

Sponsorship

Whilst the funding of local cricket comes from Zimbabwe Cricket, there is still a requirement for sponsorship from external sources. The majority of funding for League cricket comes from the Cold Chain Group. The other sponsors include Lays, Bokomo, Castle and local sponsors such as Steel Makers, Cricket Tours Africa and Vinyl Stikka Signs.

== Notable former playing and coaching staff ==
Despite having never won any trophies, the Mid West Rhinos have had a number of star players and coaches.

=== Players ===
Player	Team
Dylan Higgins	Zimbabwe
Gary Ballance	England, Zimbabwe and Yorkshire
Graeme Cremer	Zimbabwe
Paul Franks	England
Friday Kasteni	Zimbabwe
Jaik Mickleburgh	Essex
Mluleki Nkala	Zimbabwe
Ed Rainsford	Zimbabwe
Ollie Rayner	Middlesex
Darren Stevens	Kent
Shaun Tait	Australia
Brendan Taylor	Zimbabwe
Mark Vermeulen	Zimbabwe
Lou Vincent	New Zealand
Brian Vitori	Zimbabwe
Rikki Wessels	Nottinghamshire
Vusimuzi Sibanda	Nottinghamshire

=== Coaches ===
Coach	Team
Andy Waller	Zimbabwe
Jason Gillespie	Australia
Grant Flower	Pakistan

== Honours ==
Champion

- Logan Cup: 0
- Pro50 Championship: 1
  - 2020-21
- Zimbabwe Domestic Twenty20 Competition: 1
  - 2024-25

== Current coach ==
Coach	Team
Adam Chifo	Midlands

== Current squad ==
Players with international caps are listed in bold.

Name	Birth date	Batting style	Bowling style	Notes
Batsmen
**Prince Masvaure**	7 October 1988 (age 36)	Left-handed	Left-arm fast-medium	
**Takudzwanashe Kaitano**	15 June 1993 (age 32)	Right-handed	Right-arm off break	
**Ben Curran**	7 June 1986 (age 28)	Left-handed	Right-arm off break	
Remembrance Nyathi	10 December 1986 (age 38)	Right-handed	Right-arm leg break	
Charles Kunje	27 May 1994 (age 31)	Right-handed	Right-arm off break	
**Tarisai Musakanda**	31 October 1994 (age 30)	Right-handed	Right-arm medium	**First-class and List A Captain**
Eddie Byrom	17 June 1997 (age 28)	Left-handed	Right-arm leg break	
Kiran Carlson	16 May 1998 (age 27)	Right-handed	Right-arm off break	(Wales) Overseas Player
All-rounders
**Neville Madziva**	2 August 1991 (age 34)	Right-handed	Right-arm fast-medium	
**Tashinga Musekiwa**	10 February 2000 (age 25)	Right-handed	Right-arm fast-medium	
**Ryan Burl**	15 April 1994 (age 31)	Left-handed	Right-arm leg break	
**Trevor Gwandu**	24 February 1998 (age 27)	Right-handed	Right-arm fast-medium	
Antum Naqvi	5 April 1999 (age 26)	Right-handed	Right-arm off break	T20 Captain
Christophe Masike	5 June 1998 (age 27)	Right-handed	Right-arm off break	
Wicket-keeper
**Nyasha Mayavo**	1 October 1992 (age 32)	Right-handed	-	
Spin Bowlers
**Brandon Mavuta**	4 March 1998 (age 27)	Right-handed	Right-arm leg break	
Wallace Mubayiwa	24 August 1998 (age 27)	Left-handed	Slow left-arm orthodox	
Victor Chirwa	29 September 2003 (age 21)	Left-handed	Slow left-arm unorthodox	
Manson Chikowero	22 December 1999 (age 25)	Left-handed	Slow left-arm orthodox	
Pace Bowlers
**Carl Mumba**	6 May 1995 (age 30)	Right-handed	Right-arm fast-medium	
**Michael Chinouya**	19 June 1986 (age 39)	Right-handed	Right-arm fast-medium	
Tafara Chingwara	12 December 1987 (age 37)	Right-handed	Right-arm fast-medium	
Kudakwashe Macheka	25 September 2000 (age 25)	Right-handed	Right-arm fast-medium	
Ronald Masocha	6 August 1995 (age 30)	Right-handed	Right-arm fast-medium	
Davis Murwendo	25 March 1998 (age 27)	Right-handed	Right-arm medium	

Updated as on 30 March 2025
