= Matabeleland Tuskers =

Zimbabwean cricket team

Personnel
- Coach: Walter Chawaguta

Team information
- Founded: 2009
- Home ground: Queens Sports Club, Bulawayo
- Capacity: 12,490

History
- First-class debut: v Mid West Rhinos in 2009–10 at Kwekwe Sports Club
- Logan Cup wins: 2

The Matabeleland Tuskers is one of five Zimbabwean cricket franchises. They are a first-class cricket team, based in the Bulawayo Metropolitan and Matabeleland North area. They play their home matches at Queens Sports Club in Bulawayo. They were formed in 2009, when the domestic game in Zimbabwean cricket was restructured.

== History ==
In their first season, they suffered disappointing results, placing fourth in the Logan Cup, and failing to qualify for the final of either the one-day or Twenty20 competitions. The following season, they qualified for the final of the Logan Cup as league runners-up, and despite missing their best four batsmen in the final, defeated the Mountaineers by 18 runs to claim their first title. They defended their title the following year, winning five of their eight matches to clinch consecutive wins in the Logan Cup: the first team in the franchise-era to achieve the feat.

They won the 2016–17 Pro50 Championship, the domestic List A tournament.

== Notable former playing and coaching staff ==
The Mid West Rhinos have had a number of star players and coaches.

Players

Player	Team
Craig Ervine	Zimbabwe
Sean Williams	Zimbabwe
Christopher Mpofu	Zimbabwe
Dion Ebrahim	Zimbabwe
Moeen Ali	England
Mark Vermeulen	Zimbabwe
Terrence Duffin	Zimbabwe
Chris Gayle	West Indies
Andy Blignaut	Zimbabwe
Brian Chari	Zimbabwe
PJ Moor	Zimbabwe, Ireland

Coaches

Coach	Team
Heath Streak	Zimbabwe

== Honours ==
- Logan Cup: 2
  - 2010–11, 2011–12
- Pro50 Championship: 1
  - 2016-17
- Zimbabwe Domestic Twenty20 Competition: 2
  - 2018-19, 2020-21
