= List of Zimbabwe Twenty20 International cricket records =

A Twenty20 International (T20I) is a form of cricket, played between two of the international members of the International Cricket Council (ICC), in which each team faces a maximum of twenty overs. The matches have top-class status and are the highest T20 standard. The game is played under the rules of Twenty20 cricket. The first Twenty20 International match between two men's sides was played on 17 February 2005, involving Australia and New Zealand. Wisden Cricketers' Almanack reported that "neither side took the game especially seriously", and it was noted by Cricinfo that but for a large score for Ricky Ponting, "the concept would have shuddered". However, Ponting himself said "if it does become an international game then I'm sure the novelty won't be there all the time". This is a list of Zimbabwe Cricket team's Twenty20 International records. It is based on the List of Twenty20 International records, but concentrates solely on records dealing with the Zimbabwe cricket team. Zimbabwe played the first ever T20I in 2006.

== Key ==
The top five records are listed for each category, except for the team wins, losses, draws and ties, all round records and the partnership records. Tied records for fifth place are also included. Explanations of the general symbols and cricketing terms used in the list are given below. Specific details are provided in each category where appropriate. All records include matches played for Zimbabwe only, and are correct as of August 2020.

Key
Symbol	Meaning
†	Player or umpire is currently active in T20I cricket
‡	Even took place during a Cricket World Cup
*	Player remained not out or partnership remained unbroken
♠	Twenty20 International cricket record
Date	Starting date of the match
Innings	Number of innings played
Matches	Number of matches played
Opposition	The team Zimbabwe was playing against
Period	The time period when the player was active in ODI cricket
Player	The player involved in the record
Venue	Twenty20 International cricket ground where the match was played

== Team records ==
=== Overall Record ===
Matches	Won	Lost	Tied	NR	Win %
171	57	109	2	3	33.33
Last Updated: 11 September 2025

=== Team wins, losses, draws and ties ===
As of September 2025, Zimbabwe has played 171 T20I matches resulting in 57 victories, 109 defeats, 2 ties and 3 no results for an overall winning percentage of 32.00.

Opponent	Matches	Won	Lost	Tied	No Result	% Won
Full Members
Afghanistan	18	2	16	0	0	11.11
Australia	4	2	2	0	0	50.00
Bangladesh	25	8	17	0	0	32.00
England	1	0	1	0	0	0.00
India	13	3	10	0	0	23.07
Ireland	18	8	8	0	2	44.44
New Zealand	6	0	6	0	0	0.00
Pakistan	21	3	18	0	0	14.28
South Africa	8	0	7	0	1	0.00
Sri Lanka	9	2	7	0	0	22.22
West Indies	4	1	3	0	0	25.00
Associate Members
Canada	2	1	0	1	0	75.00
Gambia	1	1	0	0	0	100.00
Hong Kong	1	1	0	0	0	100.00
Jersey	1	1	0	0	0	100.00
Kenya	2	2	0	0	0	100.00
Mozambique	1	1	0	0	0	100.00
Namibia	11	4	7	0	0	36.36
Nepal	2	2	0	0	0	100.00
Netherlands	5	2	2	1	1	50.00
Nigeria	1	1	0	0	0	100.00
Papua New Guinea	1	1	0	0	0	100.00
Rwanda	2	2	0	0	0	100.00
Scotland	5	4	1	0	0	80.00
Seychelles	1	1	0	0	0	100.00
Singapore	3	2	1	0	0	66.66
Tanzania	1	1	0	0	0	100.00
Uganda	1	0	1	0	0	0
United Arab Emirates	1	1	0	0	0	100.00
United States	1	1	0	0	0	100.00
Total	171	57	109	2	3	33.33
Statistics are correct as of 11 September 2025.

=== First bilateral T20I series wins ===
Opponent	Year of first Home win	Year of first Away win
Afghanistan	-	-
Bangladesh	2022	-
India	-	YTP
Ireland	2023	-
Netherlands	YTP	-
New Zealand	-	-
Pakistan	-	-
Scotland	YTP	2021
South Africa	YTP	-
West Indies	YTP	2010
Last Updated: 3 August 2022

=== First T20I match wins ===
Opponent	Home		Away / Neutral	
Opponent	Venue	Year	Venue	Year
Afghanistan	-		Zohur Ahmed Chowdhury Stadium, Chittagong, Bangladesh	2019
Australia	-		Sahara Park Newlands, Cape Town, South Africa	2007
Bangladesh	Queens Sports Club, Bulawayo, Zimbabwe	2013	Sher-e-Bangla National Cricket Stadium, Mirpur, Bangladesh	2015
Canada	YTP		Maple Leaf North-West Ground, King City, Canada	2008
England	YTP		–	
Hong Kong	YTP		Vidarbha Cricket Association Stadium, Nagpur, India	2016
India	Harare Sports Club, Harare, Zimbabwe	2015	-	
Ireland	Harare Sports Club, Harare, Zimbabwe	2023	Bready Cricket Club Ground, Magheramason, Northern Ireland	2019
Namibia	Queens Sports Club, Bulawayo, Zimbabwe	2022	Wanderers Cricket Ground, Windhoek, Namibia	2023
Nepal	YTP		Indian Association Ground, Singapore, Singapore	2019
Netherlands	Queens Sports Club, Bulawayo, Zimbabwe	2022	Sylhet International Cricket Stadium, Sylhet, Bangladesh	2014
New Zealand	-			
Pakistan	Harare Sports Club, Harare, Zimbabwe	2021	Optus Stadium, Perth, Australia	2022
Scotland	YTP		Vidarbha Cricket Association Stadium, Nagpur, India	2016
Singapore	Queens Sports Club, Bulawayo, Zimbabwe	2022	Indian Association Ground, Singapore, Singapore	2019
South Africa	YTP		-	
Sri Lanka	Harare Sports Club, Harare	2025	R.Premadasa Stadium, Colombo, Sri Lanka	2024
United Arab Emirates	YTP		Sylhet International Cricket Stadium, Sylhet, Bangladesh	2014
West Indies	YTP		Queen's Park Oval, Port of Spain, Trinidad and Tobago	2010
Last Updated: 11 September 2025

=== Team scoring records ===
==== Most runs in an innings ====
Rank	Score	Opposition	Venue	Date
1	344/4	Gambia	Ruaraka Sports Club Ground, Nairobi, Kenya	23 October 2024
2	286/5	Seychelles	Gymkhana Club Ground, Nairobi, Kenya	19 October 2024
3	240/8	Rwanda	Ruaraka Sports Club Ground, Nairobi, Kenya	22 October 2024
4	236/5	Singapore	Queens Sports Club, Bulawayo, Zimbabwe	11 July 2022
5	217/4	Kenya	United Ground, Windhoek, Namibia	27 November 2023
Last Updated: 23 October 2024

==== Fewest runs in an innings ====
Rank	Score	Opposition	Venue	Date
1	57	Pakistan	Queens Sports Club, Bulawayo, Zimbabwe	3 December 2024
2	82	Sri Lanka	R. Premadasa Stadium, Colombo, Sri Lanka	18 January 2024
3	84	New Zealand	Providence Stadium, Providence, Guyana	4 May 2010 ‡
4	90/9	Afghanistan	Harare Sports Club, Harare, Zimbabwe	14 June 2022
5	93/8	South Africa	Mahinda Rajapaksa International Stadium, Hambantota, Sri Lanka	20 September 2012 ‡
Last Updated: 3 December 2024

==== Most runs conceded an innings ====
Rank	Score	Opposition	Venue	Date
1	234/2	India	Harare Sports Club, Harare, Zimbabwe	7 July 2024
2	229/2	Australia	Harare Sports Club, Harare, Zimbabwe	3 July 2018
3	215/6	Afghanistan	Sharjah Cricket Association Stadium, Sharjah, UAE	10 January 2016
4	202/5	New Zealand	Seddon Park, Hamilton, New Zealand	14 February 2012
5	200/3	Bangladesh	Sher-e-Bangla National Cricket Stadium, Mirpur, Bangladesh	9 March 2020
Last Updated: 7 July 2024

==== Fewest runs conceded in an innings ====
Rank	Score	Opposition	Venue	Date
1	54	Gambia	Ruaraka Sports Club Ground, Nairobi, Kenya	23 October 2024
2	56	Mozambique	Gymkhana Club Ground, Nairobi, Kenya	20 October 2024
3	71	Rwanda	Wanderers Cricket Ground, Windhoek, Namibia	27 November 2023
4	75	Canada	Maple Leaf North-West Ground, King City, Canada	13 October 2008
5	79/7	West Indies	Queen's Park Oval, Port of Spain, Trinidad and Tobago	28 February 2010
Last Updated: 11 September 2025

==== Most runs aggregate in a match ====
Rank	Aggregate	Scores	Venue	Date
1	402/7	Zimbabwe (200/2 ) v New Zealand (202/5)	Seddon Park, Hamilton, New Zealand	14 February 2012
2	398/8	Namibia (198/3 ) v Zimbabwe (200/5 )	Wanderers Cricket Ground, Windhoek, Namibia	25 October 2023
2	398/13	Zimbabwe (344/4) v Gambia (54)	Ruaraka Sports Club Ground, Nairobi, Kenya	23 October 2024
3	393/9	Zimbabwe (205/3) v Bangladesh (188/6)	Harare Sports Club, Harare, Zimbabwe	30 July 2022
4	387/10	Zimbabwe (193/5) v Bangladesh (194/5)	Harare Sports Club, Harare, Zimbabwe	25 July 2021
Last Updated: 11 September 2025

==== Fewest runs aggregate in a match ====
Rank	Aggregate	Scores	Venue	Date
1	113/11	Mozambique (56) v Zimbabwe (57/1)	Gymkhana Club Ground, Nairobi, Kenya	20 October 2024
2	118/10	Zimbabwe (57) v Pakistan (61/0)	Queens Sports Club, Bulawayo, Zimbabwe	3 December 2024
3	120/11	Zimbabwe (84) v New Zealand (36/1)	Providence Stadium, Providence, Guyana	4 May 2010 ‡
4	164/15	Sri Lanka (80) v Zimbabwe (84/5	Harare Sports Club, Harare, Zimbabwe	6 September 2025
5	170/11	Zimbabwe (82) v Sri Lanka (88/1)	R. Premadasa Stadium, Colombo, Sri Lanka	18 January 2024
Last Updated: 11 September 2025

=== Result records ===
==== Greatest win margins (by runs) ====
Rank	Margin	Opposition	Venue	Date
5	290 runs	Gambia	Ruaraka Sports Club Ground, Nairobi, Kenya	23 October 2024
4	149 runs	Rwanda	Ruaraka Sports Club Ground, Nairobi, Kenya	22 October 2024
1	144 runs	Rwanda	Wanderers Cricket Ground, Windhoek, Namibia	27 November 2023
2	111 runs	Singapore	Queens Sports Club, Bulawayo, Zimbabwe	11 July 2022
3	110 runs	Kenya	United Ground, Windhoek, Namibia	30 November 2023
Last Updated: 11 September 2025

==== Greatest win margins (by balls remaining) ====
Rank	Balls remaining	Margin	Opposition	Venue	Date
1	90	9 wickets	Mozambique	Gymkhana Club Ground, Nairobi, Kenya	20 October 2024
2	56	9 wickets	Tanzania	United Ground, Windhoek, Namibia	23 November 2023
3	38	5 wickets	United Arab Emirates	Sylhet International Cricket Stadium, Sylhet, Bangladesh	21 March 2014 ‡
4	36	6 wickets	Nigeria	United Ground, Windhoek, Namibia	3 October 2019
5	34	5 wickets	Sri Lanka	Harare Sports Club, Harare, Zimbabwe	18 January 2024
Last Updated: 11 September 2025

==== Greatest win margins (by wickets) ====
Rank	Margin	Opposition	Venue	Date
1	9 wickets	Tanzania	United Ground, Windhoek, Namibia	23 November 2023
2	8 wickets	Ireland	Bready Cricket Club Ground, Magheramason, Northern Ireland	14 July 2019
2	8 wickets	Singapore	Indian Association Ground, Singapore	3 October 2019
2	8 wickets	Namibia	Queens Sports Club, Bulawayo, Zimbabwe	21 May 2022
2	8 wickets	Bangladesh	Sher-e-Bangla National Cricket Stadium, Mirpur, Bangladesh	12 May 2024
Last updated: 12 May 2024

==== Highest successful run chases ====
Rank	Score	Target	Opposition	Venue	Date
1	200/5	156	Namibia	Wanderers Cricket Ground, Windhoek, Namibia	25 October 2023
2	180/4	180	Scotland	The Grange Club, Edinburgh, Scotland	19 September 2021
3	178/6	174	Sri Lanka	R. Premadasa Stadium, Colombo, Sri Lanka	16 January 2024
4	172/2	172	Ireland	Bready Cricket Club Ground, Magheramason, Northern Ireland	14 July 2019
5	168/2	168	Singapore	Indian Association Ground, Singapore, Singapore	3 October 2019
Last Updated: 11 September 2025

==== Narrowest win margins (by runs) ====
Rank	Margin	Opposition	Venue	Date
1	1 Run	Pakistan	Perth Stadium, Perth, Australia	27 October 2022
2	2 Runs	India	Harare Sports Club, Harare, Zimbabwe	18 June 2016
3	3 Runs	Ireland	Castle Avenue, Dublin, Ireland	27 August 2021
4	5 Runs	Ireland	Bready Cricket Club Ground, Magheramason, Northern Ireland	4 September 2021
5	6 Runs	Bangladesh	Queens Sports Club, Bulawayo, Zimbabwe	11 May 2013
Last Updated: 27 October 2022

==== Narrowest win margins (by balls remaining) ====
Rank	Balls remaining	Margin	Opposition	Venue	Date
1	0	5 wickets	Netherlands	Sylhet International Cricket Stadium, Sylhet, Bangladesh	19 March 2014 ‡
1	0	5 wickets	Namibia	Wanderers Cricket Ground, Windhoek, Namibia	25 October 2023
1	0	1 wicket	Ireland	Harare Sports Club, Harare, Zimbabwe	7 December 2023
2	1	5 wickets	Australia	Newlands Cricket Ground, Cape Town, South Africa	12 September 2007 ‡
2	1	3 wickets	Bangladesh	Sher-e-Bangla National Cricket Stadium, Mirpur, Bangladesh	15 November 2015
Last Updated: 7 December 2023

==== Narrowest win margins (by wickets) ====
Rank	Margin	Opposition	Venue	Date
1	1 wicket	Ireland	Harare Sports Club, Harare, Zimbabwe	7 December 2023
2	2 wickets	Pakistan	Queens Sports Club, Bulawayo, Zimbabwe	5 December 2025
3	3 wickets	Bangladesh	Sher-e-Bangla National Cricket Stadium, Mirpur, Bangladesh	15 November 2015
3	3 wickets	Ireland	Harare Sports Club, Harare, Zimbabwe	23 February 2025
4	4 wickets	Ireland	Harare Sports Club, Harare, Zimbabwe	15 January 2023
4	4 wickets	Sri Lanka	R. Premadasa Stadium, Colombo, Sri Lanka	16 January 2024
4	4 wickets	Afghanistan	Harare Sports Club, Harare, Zimbabwe	11 December 2024
Last Updated: 11 September 2025

==== Greatest loss margins (by runs) ====
Rank	Margin	Opposition	Venue	Date
1	100 runs	Australia	Harare Sports Club, Harare, Zimbabwe	3 July 2018
1	100 runs	India	Harare Sports Club, Harare, Zimbabwe	7 July 2024
3	85 runs	Pakistan	Harare Sports Club, Harare, Zimbabwe	16 September 2011
4	82 runs	Sri Lanka	Mahinda Rajapaksa International Stadium, Hambantota, Sri Lanka	18 September 2012‡
5	81 runs	Afghanistan	Sharjah Cricket Association Stadium, Sharjah, UAE	10 January 2016
Last Updated: 7 July 2024

==== Greatest loss margins (by balls remaining) ====
Rank	Balls remaining	Margin	Opposition	Venue	Date
1	55	9 wickets	Sri Lanka	R. Premadasa Stadium, Colombo, Sri Lanka	18 January 2024
2	44	10 wickets	South Africa	Mahinda Rajapaksa International Stadium, Hambantota, Sri Lanka	20 September 2012 ‡
3	41	10 wickets	India	Harare Sports Club, Harare, Zimbabwe	20 June 2016
4	39	10 wickets	New Zealand	Harare Sports Club, Harare, Zimbabwe	15 October 2011
5	38	7 wickets	Namibia	Wanderers Cricket Ground, Windhoek, Namibia	24 October 2023
Last Updated: 18 January 2024

==== Greatest loss margins (by wickets) ====
Rank	Margins	Opposition	Most recent venue	Date
1	10 wickets	New Zealand	Harare Sports Club, Harare, Zimbabwe	15 October 2011
1	10 wickets	South Africa	Mahinda Rajapaksa International Stadium, Hambantota, Sri Lanka	20 September 2012 ‡
1	10 wickets	India	Harare Sports Club, Harare, Zimbabwe	20 June 2016
1	10 wickets	India	Harare Sports Club, Harare, Zimbabwe	13 July 2024
5	9 wickets	Ireland	Bready Cricket Club Ground, Magheramason, Northern Ireland	12 July 2019
5	9 wickets	Bangladesh	Sher-e-Bangla National Cricket Stadium, Mirpur, Bangladesh	11 March 2020
5	9 wickets	Sri Lanka	R. Premadasa Stadium, Colombo, Sri Lanka	18 January 2024
Last Updated: 13 July 2024

==== Narrowest loss margins (by runs) ====
Rank	Margin	Opposition	Venue	Date
1	3 runs	India	Harare Sports Club, Harare, Zimbabwe	22 June 2016
1	3 runs	Bangladesh	The Gabba, Brisbane, Australia	30 October 2022‡
3	4 runs	Singapore	Indian Association Ground, Singapore	29 September 2019
4	5 runs	Pakistan	Harare Sports Club, Harare, Zimbabwe	18 September 2011
4	5 runs	Afghanistan	Sharjah Cricket Association Stadium, Sharjah, UAE	8 January 2016
4	5 runs	Bangladesh	Sher-e-Bangla National Cricket Stadium, Mirpur, Bangladesh	10 May 2024
Last Updated: 10 May 2024

==== Narrowest loss margins (by balls remaining) ====
Rank	Balls remaining	Margin	Opposition	Venue	Date
1	0	3 wickets	Ireland	Sylhet International Cricket Stadium, Sylhet, Bangladesh	17 March 2014‡
1	0	6 wickets	Namibia	Queens Sports Club, Bulawayo, Zimbabwe	22 May 2022
1	0	3 wickets	Sri Lanka	R. Premadasa Stadium, Colombo, Sri Lanka	14 January 2024
4	1	5 wickets	Afghanistan	Queens Sports Club, Bulawayo, Zimbabwe	28 October 2015
4	1	5 wickets	Australia	Harare Sports Club, Harare, Zimbabwe	6 July 2018
Last Updated: 14 January 2024

==== Narrowest loss margins (by wickets) ====
Rank	Margin	Opposition	Venue	Date
1	2 wickets	Pakistan	Gaddafi Stadium, Lahore, Pakistan	24 May 2015
2	3 wickets	Ireland	Sylhet International Cricket Stadium, Sylhet, Bangladesh	17 March 2014‡
2	3 wickets	Bangladesh	Sher-e-Bangla National Cricket Stadium, Mirpur, Bangladesh	13 September 2019
2	3 wickets	Sri Lanka	R. Premadasa Stadium, Colombo, Sri Lanka	14 January 2024
5	4 wickets	Bangladesh	Sher-e-Bangla National Cricket Stadium, Mirpur, Bangladesh	13 November 2015
5	4 wickets	Bangladesh	Sheikh Abu Naser Stadium, Khulna, Bangladesh	15 January 2016
5	4 wickets	Ireland	Harare Sports Club, Harare, Zimbabwe	9 December 2023
Last Updated: 14 January 2024

==== Tied matches ====
Opposition	Venue	Date
Canada	Maple Leaf North-West Ground, King City, Canada	11 October 2008
Netherlands	Hazelaarweg Stadion, Rotterdam, Netherlands	25 June 2019
Last updated: 3 December 2017

== Batting records ==
=== Most career runs ===
Rank	Runs	Player	Matches	Innings	Average	100	50	Period
1	2,985	Sikandar Raza†	131	126	26.18	1	16	2013–2026
2	1,943	Ryan Burl†	116	107	25.9	0	4	2018–2026
3	1,805	Sean Williams†	85	84	23.75	0	12	2006–2025
4	1,776	Brian Bennett†	56	56	34.82	1	11	2023-2026
5	1,662	Hamilton Masakadza	66	66	25.96	0	11	2006–2019
6	1,449	Craig Ervine†	71	70	21.95	0	9	2010–2024
7	1,256	Wessly Madhevere	79	74	19.03	0	7	2020-2025
8	1,249	Tadiwanashe Marumani	65	65	20.14	0	5	2021-2026
9	1,216	Brendan Taylor	59	57	24.32	1	6	2006-2026
10	893	Elton Chigumbura	57	56	19.00	0	6	2006-2020
Last Updated: 11 September 2025

=== Fastest to multiples of 1,000 runs ===
Runs	Batsman	Innings	Record Date	Reference
1,000	Hamilton Masakadza	38	29 September 2015	
1,000	Brian Bennett	38	15 September 2025	
2,000	Sikandar Raza	86	13 July 2024	

==== Most runs in each batting position ====
Batting position	Batsman	Innings	Runs	Average	Career Span	Ref
Opener	Brian Bennett	40	1,480	34.94	2024–2026	
Number 3	Craig Ervine†	26	680	29.56	2015–2024	
Number 4	Sikandar Raza†	42	1,096	28.84	2015–2025	
Number 5	Sikandar Raza†	43	863	21.57	2013–2024	
Number 6	Ryan Burl†	25	441	33.92	2019–2024	
Number 7	Ryan Burl†	25	406	23.88	2018–2024	
Number 8	Luke Jongwe†	27	296	14.80	2015–2024	
Number 9	Wellington Masakadza†	17	126	10.50	2015–2024	
Number 10	Faraz Akram†	2	36	-	2020-2024	
Number 11	Christopher Mpofu	8	26	13	2008–2020	
Number 11	Blessing Muzarabani†	9	26	13	2018–2024	
Last Updated: 11 September 2025

==== Highest individual score ====
Rank	Runs	Player	Opposition	Venue	Date
1	133*	Sikandar Raza	Gambia	Ruaraka Sports Club Ground, Nairobi, Kenya	23 October 2024
3	123	Brendan Taylor	Botswana	Harare Sports Club, Harare, Zimbabwe	28 Sep 2025
4	111	Brian Bennett	Tanzania	Harare Sports Club, Harare, Zimbabwe	30 September 2025
5	97*	Brian Bennett	India	M. A. Chidambaram Stadium, Chennai, India	26 February 2026
2	96	Dion Myers	Rwanda	Ruaraka Sports Club Ground, Nairobi, Kenya	22 October 2024
Last Updated: 1 March 2026

==== Highest individual score – progression of record ====
Runs	Player	Opponent	Venue	Season
38	Sean Williams†	Bangladesh	Sheikh Abu Naser Stadium, Khulna, Bangladesh	28 November 2006
	[[ {{{last}}}]]	Australia	[[]], [[]],	‡
79	Hamilton Masakadza	Canada	Maple Leaf North-West Ground, King City, Canada	13 October 2008
79	Hamilton Masakadza	Bangladesh	Sheikh Abu Naser Stadium, Khulna, Bangladesh	15 January 2016
93*	Hamilton Masakadza	Bangladesh	Sheikh Abu Naser Stadium, Khulna, Bangladesh	22 January 2016
94	Solomon Mire	Pakistan	Harare Sports Club, Harare, Zimbabwe	4 July 2018
96	Dion Myers	Rwanda	Ruaraka Sports Club Ground, Nairobi, Kenya	22 October 2024
133*	Sikandar Raza	Gambia	Ruaraka Sports Club Ground, Nairobi, Kenya	23 October 2024
Last Updated: 24 October 2024

==== Highest career average ====
Rank	Average	Player	Innings	Runs	Not out	Period
1	36.30	Brian Bennett†	58	1,888	6	2023–2026
2	26.65	Malcolm Waller	32	613	8	2011–2018
3	26.62	Sikandar Raza†	133	3,089	12	2013–2026
4	25.96	Hamilton Masakadza	66	1,662	2	2006–2019
5	25.29	Ryan Burl†	118	1,948	32	2018–2026
Qualification: 20 innings. Last Updated: 26 February 2026

==== Highest Average in each batting position ====
Batting position	Batsman	Innings	Runs	Average	Career Span	Ref
Opener	Brian Bennett†	44	1,660	41.50	2023–2026	
Number 3	Brendan Taylor	18	420	30.00	2010–2018	
Number 4	Sikandar Raza†	42	1,092	28.84	2015–2025	
Number 5	Sean Williams	17	399	28.50	2006–2024	
Number 6	Ryan Burl†	25	441	33.92	2019–2025	
Number 7	Ryan Burl†	25	406	23.88	2018–2024	
Number 8	Luke Jongwe†	27	296	14.80	2015–2024	
Number 9	Wellington Masakadza†	17	126	10.50	2015–2024	
Number 10	Blessing Muzarabani†	11	16	2.66	2018–2024	
Number 11	Christopher Mpofu	8	26	13.00	2008–2020	
Last Updated: 12 September 2025 Qualification: Minimum 10 innings batted.

==== Most half-centuries ====
Rank	Half centuries	Player	Innings	Runs	Period
1	17	Sikandar Raza†	128	3,089	2013–2026
2	12	Brian Bennett	58	1,888	2023–2026
2	12	Sean Williams†	84	1,805	2006–2025
5	11	Hamilton Masakadza	66	1,662	2006–2019
4	9	Craig Ervine†	70	1,449	2010–2024
Last Updated: 26 February 2026

=== Most Sixes ===
Rank	Sixes	Player	Innings	Period
1	96	Sikandar Raza†	87	2013–2024
2	65	Hamilton Masakadza	66	2006–2019
3	53	Elton Chigumbura	56	2006–2020
4	49	Ryan Burl†	70	2018–2024
5	42	Sean Williams†	80	2006–2024
Last Updated: 14 July 2024

==== Most Fours ====
Rank	Fours	Player	Innings	Period
1	161	Sean Williams†	80	2006–2024
2	153	Sikandar Raza	87	2013–2024
3	151	Hamilton Masakadza	66	2006–2019
4	143	Craig Ervine†	70	2010–2024
5	129	Wessly Madhevere†	62	2020–2024
Last Updated: 14 July 2024

==== Highest strike rates ====
Rank	Strike rate	Player	Runs	Balls Faced	Period
1	140.62	Elton Chigumbura	893	635	2006–2020
2	138.37	Malcolm Waller	613	443	2011–2018
3	133.31	Sikandar Raza†	2,037	1,528	2008–2024
4	127.27	Peter Moor	364	286	2016–2019
5	126.38	Sean Williams†	1,691	1,338	2006–2024
Qualification= 250 balls faced. Last Updated: 14 July 2024

==== Highest strike rates in an inning ====
Rank	Strike rate	Player	Runs	Balls Faced	Opposition	Venue	Date
1	288.88	Brian Bennett	26	9	India	Harare Sports Club, Harare, Zimbabwe	7 July 2024
2	283.33	Sean Williams †	34	12	Ireland	Bready Cricket Club Ground, Magheramason, Northern Ireland	12 July 2019
3	272.72	Ryan Burl	30*	11	Ireland	Harare Sports Club, Harare, Zimbabwe	15 January 2023
4	252.63	Regis Chakabva	48	19	Singapore	Indian Association Ground, Singapore, Singapore	29 September 2019
5	252.38	Elton Chigumbura	53*	21	United Arab Emirates	Sylhet International Cricket Stadium, Sylhet, Bangladesh	21 March 2014 ‡
Last Updated: 7 July 2024

==== Most runs in a calendar year ====
Rank	Runs	Player	Matches	Innings	Year
1	735	Sikandar Raza†	24	23	2022
2	515	Sikandar Raza†	12	11	2023
3	453	Wessly Madhevere	23	23	2022
4	411	Hamilton Masakadza	12	12	2016
5	395	Sean Williams†	16	16	2022
Last Updated: 1 January 2024

==== Most runs in a series ====
Rank	Runs	Player	Matches	Innings	Series
1	228	Sikandar Raza	5	5	ICC Men's T20 World Cup Qualifier (in Zimbabwe), 2022
2	222	Hamilton Masakadza	4	4	Zimbabwe in Bangladesh in January 2016
3	212	Solomon Mire	4	4	2018 Zimbabwe Tri-Nation Series
4	197	Sean Williams	5	5	ICC Men's T20 World Cup Qualifier (in Zimbabwe), 2022
5	169	Hamilton Masakadza	4	4	2008 Quadrangular Twenty20 Series in Canada
Last Updated: 18 July 2022

==== Most ducks ====
Rank	Ducks	Player	Matches	Innings	Period
1	11	Regis Chakabva	49	49	2008–2022
2	7	Sikandar Raza†	91	87	2013–2024
3	6	Richard Ngarava	55	22	2019–2024
3	6	Elton Chigumbura	57	56	2006–2020
3	6	Wessly Madhevere	65	62	2020–2024
3	6	Sean Williams†	81	80	2006–2024
Last Updated: 14 July 2024

== Bowling records ==
=== Most career wickets ===
Rank	Wickets	Player	Matches	Innings	Period
1	66	Blessing Muzarabani†	56	55	2018–2024
1	66	Luke Jongwe†	65	57	2015–2024
1	66	Sikandar Raza†	91	80	2013–2024
4	65	Tendai Chatara†	60	60	2010–2024
5	63	Richard Ngarava†	55	55	2019–2024
Last Updated: 14 July 2024

=== Best figures in an innings ===
Rank	Figures	Player	Opposition	Venue	Date
1	4/8	Sikandar Raza	Netherlands	Queens Sports Club, Bulawayo, Zimbabwe	17 July 2022
2	4/11	Wellington Masakadza	United States	Queens Sports Club, Bulawayo, Zimbabwe	14 July 2022
3	4/18	Luke Jongwe	Pakistan	Harare Sports Club, Harare, Zimbabwe	23 April 2021
4	4/24	Sikandar Raza	Namibia	United Ground, Windhoek, Namibia	30 October 2023
5	4/28	Wellington Masakadza	Scotland	Vidarbha Cricket Association Stadium, Nagpur, India	10 March 2016‡
Last Updated: 30 October 2023

=== Best figures in an innings – progression of record ===
Figures	Player	Opposition	Venue	Date
3/25	Prosper Utseya†	Bangladesh	Sheikh Abu Naser Stadium, Khulna, Bangladesh	28 November 2006
3/20	Elton Chigumbura	Australia	Sahara Park Newlands, Cape Town, South Africa	12 September 2007 ‡
4/31	Elton Chigumbura	England	Sahara Park Newlands, Cape Town, South Africa	13 September 2007 ‡
4/28	Wellington Masakadza	Scotland	Vidarbha Cricket Association Stadium, Nagpur, India	10 March 2016 ‡
4/18	Luke Jongwe	Pakistan	Harare Sports Club, Zimbabwe	23 April 2021
4/11	Wellington Masakadza	United States	Queens Sports Club, Bulawayo, Zimbabwe	14 July 2022
4/8	Sikandar Raza	Netherlands	Queens Sports Club, Bulawayo, Zimbabwe	17 July 2022
Last Updated: 17 July 2022

=== Best career average ===
Rank	Average	Player	Wickets	Runs	Balls	Period
1	18.85	Graeme Cremer	35	660	570	2008–2018
2	19.40	Luke Jongwe†	47	912	660	2015–2022
3	21.56	Ryan Burl†	32	690	576	2018–2022
4	24.73	Tendai Chatara†	47	1,080	882	2010–2022
5	24.93	Wellington Masakadza†	31	773	642	2015–2022
Qualification: 500 balls. Last Updated: 31 July 2022

=== Best career economy rate ===
Rank	Economy rate	Player	Wickets	Runs	Balls	Period
1	6.87	Prosper Utseya	26	858	749	2006–2015
2	6.94	Graeme Cremer	35	660	570	2008–2018
3	6.99	Sean Williams†	36	1,098	942	2006–2022
4	7.18	Ryan Burl†	32	690	576	2018–2022
5	7.22	Wellington Masakadza†	31	773	642	2015–2022
Qualification: 500 balls. Last Updated: 31 July 2022

=== Best career strike rate ===
Rank	Strike rate	Player	Wickets	Runs	Balls	Period
1	14.0	Luke Jongwe†	47	912	660	2015–2022
2	16.2	Graeme Cremer	35	660	570	2008–2018
3	18.0	Ryan Burl†	32	690	576	2018–2022
4	18.7	Tendai Chatara†	47	1,080	882	2010–2022
5	19.8	Blessing Muzarabani†	30	791	594	2018–2022
Qualification: 500 balls. Last Updated: 31 July 2022

=== Most four-wickets (& over) hauls in an innings ===
Rank	Four-wicket hauls	Player	Matches	Balls	Wickets	Period
1	1	Elton Chigumbura	57	276	16	2006–2019
1	1	Neville Madziva	15	281	12	2015–2019
1	1	Wellington Masakadza	28	540	26	2015–2021
1	1	Christopher Mpofu	32	694	33	2008–2020
1	1	Tinashe Panyangara	14	303	20	2013–2016
1	1	Luke Jongwe †	22	432	33	2014-2021
Last Updated: 19 September 2021

=== Best economy rates in an inning ===
Rank	Economy	Player	Overs	Runs	Wickets	Opposition	Venue	Date
1	1.50	Prosper Utseya	4	6	0	Pakistan	Maple Leaf North-West Ground, King City, Canada	12 October 2008
1	1.50	Ray Price	4	6	2	Canada	Maple Leaf North-West Ground, King City, Canada	13 October 2008
1	1.50	Christopher Mpofu	4	6	1	Canada	Maple Leaf North-West Ground, King City, Canada	13 October 2008
4	2.25	Ray Price	4	9	2	Sri Lanka	Maple Leaf North-West Ground, King City, Canada	10 October 2008
5	2.75	Graeme Cremer	4	11	3	West Indies	Queen's Park Oval, Port of Spain, Trinidad and Tobago	28 February 2010
Qualification: 12 balls bowled. Last Updated: 9 August 2020

=== Best strike rates in an inning ===
Rank	Strike rate	Player	Wickets	Runs	Balls	Opposition	Venue	Date
1	5.7	Luke Jongwe	4	18	23	Pakistan	Harare Sports Club, Harare, Zimbabwe	23 April 2021
2	6.0	Elton Chigumbura	4	31	24	England	Sahara Park Newlands, Cape Town, South Africa	13 September 2007 ‡
2	6.0	Tinashe Panyangara	4	37	24	Ireland	Sylhet International Cricket Stadium, Sylhet, Bangladesh	17 March 2014 ‡
2	6.0	Neville Madziva †	4	34	24	Bangladesh	Sheikh Abu Naser Stadium, Khulna, Bangladesh	22 January 2016
2	6.0	Wellington Masakadza	4	28	24	Scotland	Vidarbha Cricket Association Stadium, Nagpur, India	10 March 2016 ‡
2	6.0	Christopher Mpofu	4	30	24	Afghanistan	Zohur Ahmed Chowdhury Stadium, Chittagong, Bangladesh	20 September 2019
Last Updated: 23 April 2021

=== Worst figures in an innings ===
Rank	Figures	Player	Overs	Opposition	Venue	Date
1	0/59	Christopher Mpofu	4	Pakistan	Harare Sports Club, Harare, Zimbabwe	16 September 2011
2	0/53	Christopher Mpofu	4	Australia	Harare Sports Club, Harare, Zimbabwe	3 July 2018
2	0/53	Kyle Jarvis	4	Afghanistan	Sher-e-Bangla National Cricket Stadium, Mirpur, Bangladesh	14 September 2019
4	0/49	Christopher Mpofu	4	Sri Lanka	Mahinda Rajapaksa International Stadium, Hambantota, Sri Lanka	18 September 2012 ‡
5	0/47	Tendai Chatara †	4	Ireland	Bready Cricket Club Ground, Magheramason, Northern Ireland	1 September 2021
Last Updated: 1 September 2021

=== Most runs conceded in a match ===
Rank	Figures	Player	Overs	Opposition	Venue	Date
1	1/59	Christopher Mpofu	4	South Africa	De Beers Diamond Oval, Kimberley, South Africa	10 October 2010
1	0/59	Christopher Mpofu	4	Pakistan	Harare Sports Club, Harare, Zimbabwe	16 September 2011
3	1/58	Christopher Mpofu	4	Bangladesh	Sher-e-Bangla National Cricket Stadium, Mirpur, Bangladesh	9 March 2020
4	1/56	Chamu Chibhabha	4	Afghanistan	Sharjah Cricket Association Stadium, Sharjah, UAE	10 January 2016
5	0/53	Christopher Mpofu	4	Australia	Harare Sports Club, Harare, Zimbabwe	3 July 2018
5	2/53	Tendai Chatara	4	Afghanistan	Sher-e-Bangla National Cricket Stadium, Mirpur, Bangladesh	14 September 2019
5	0/53	Kyle Jarvis	4	Afghanistan	Sher-e-Bangla National Cricket Stadium, Mirpur, Bangladesh	14 September 2019
Last updated:9 August 2020

=== Most wickets in a calendar year ===
Rank	Wickets	Player	Innings	Year
1	26	Luke Jongwe	14	2021
2	20	Sikandar Raza†	18	2022
3	17	Tendai Chatara†	13	2022
4	15	Luke Jongwe†	17	2022
5	14	Graeme Cremer	9	2015
Last Updated: 21 October 2022

=== Most wickets in a series ===
Rank	Wickets	Player	Matches	Series
1	9	Luke Jongwe	3	Pakistan in Zimbabwe in 2021
2	7	Elton Chigumbura	2	2007 ICC World Twenty20
2	7	Luke Jongwe	5	Zimbabwe in Ireland in 2021
4	6	Graeme Cremer	4	Zimbabwe in Bangladesh in January 2016
4	6	Kyle Jarvis	4	2019-20 Bangladesh Tri-Nation Series
4	6	Christopher Mpofu †	2	2019-20 Bangladesh Tri-Nation Series
4	6	Ryan Burl	4	2019-20 Bangladesh Tri-Nation Series
4	6	Sean Williams †	4	2019-20 Bangladesh Tri-Nation Series
4	6	Blessing Muzarabani	3	Zimbabwe v Afghanistan in UAE in 2021
4	6	Ryan Burl	3	Zimbabwe in Ireland in 2021
Last Updated: 19 September 2021

== Wicket-keeping records ==
=== Most career dismissals ===
Rank	Dismissals	Player	Matches	Innings	Period
1	23	Richmond Mutumbami†	29	22	2015–2022
2	19	Brendan Taylor	45	29	2006–2019
3	18	Regis Chakabva†	39	30	2008–2022
4	11	Tatenda Taibu	17	15	2008–2012
5	2	Peter Moor	21	6	2016–2018
Last updated: 31 July 2022

=== Most career catches ===
Rank	Catches	Player	Matches	Innings	Period
1	18	Richmond Mutumbami†	26	22	2015–2022
2	17	Regis Chakabva†	39	30	2008–2022
2	17	Brendan Taylor	45	29	2006–2019
4	6	Tatenda Taibu	17	15	2008–2012
5	2	Peter Moor	21	6	2016–2018
Last Updated: 31 July 2022

=== Most career stumpings ===
Rank	Stumpings	Player	Matches	Innings	Period
1	5	Tatenda Taibu	17	15	2008–2012
1	5	Richmond Mutumbami†	29	22	2015–2022
3	2	Brendan Taylor	45	29	2006–2019
4	1	Regis Chakabva†	39	30	2008–2022
Last Updated: 31 July 2022

=== Most dismissals in an innings ===
Rank	Dismissals	Player	Opposition	Venue	Date
1	4	Richmond Mutumbami †	Scotland	Vidarbha Cricket Association Stadium, Nagpur, India	10 March 2016
1	4	Richmond Mutumbami †	Singapore	Indian Association Ground, Singapore, Singapore	29 September 2019
3	3	Tatenda Taibu	Canada	Maple Leaf North-West Ground, King City, Canada	13 October 2008
3	3	Brendan Taylor	Afghanistan	Sharjah Cricket Association Stadium, Sharjah, UAE	5 February 2018
5	2	4 Zimbabwean wicket keepers on 11 occasions have affected 2 dismissals in an innings.			
Last Updated: 21 March 2021

=== Most dismissals in a series ===
Rank	Dismissals	Player	Matches	Innings	Series
1	7	Richmond Mutumbami †	4	4	2019 Singapore Tri-Nation Series
2	6	Tatenda Taibu	4	4	2008 Quadrangular Twenty20 Series in Canada
3	5	Brendan Taylor	2	2	Afghanistan v Zimbabwe in the UAE in 2017-18
3	5	Richmond Mutumbami †	3	3	Afghanistan v Zimbabwe in the UAE in 2021
5	4	Richmond Mutumbami †	3	3	2016 ICC World Twenty20
Last Updated: 21 March 2021

== Fielding records ==
=== Most career catches ===
Rank	Catches	Player	Matches	Innings	Ct/Inn	Period
1	25	Sikandar Raza†	58	58	0.431	2013–2022
1	25	Hamilton Masakadza	66	66	0.378	2006–2019
3	23	Ryan Burl†	47	47	0.489	2018–2022
4	22	Elton Chigumbura	57	57	0.385	2006–2020
5	21	Craig Ervine†	49	49	0.428	2010–2022
5	21	Sean Williams†	58	58	0.362	2006–2022
Last Updated: 3 August 2022

=== Most catches in an innings ===
Rank	Dismissals	Player	Opposition	Venue	Date
1	3	Vusi Sibanda	Pakistan	Gaddafi Stadium, Lahore, Pakistan	24 May 2015
1	3	Hamilton Masakadza	South Africa	Buffalo Park, East London, South Africa	9 October 2018
1	3	Craig Ervine †	Netherlands	Hazelaarweg Stadion, Rotterdam, Netherlands	25 June 2019
1	3	Wellington Masakadza †	Bangladesh	Harare Sports Club, Harare, Zimbabwe	23 July 2021
1	3	Sikandar Raza †	Bangladesh	Harare Sports Club, Harare, Zimbabwe	23 July 2021
1	3	Ryan Burl †	Scotland	The Grange Club, Edinburgh, Scotland	17 September 2021
1	3	Innocent Kaia †	Scotland	The Grange Club, Edinburgh, Scotland	17 September 2021
Last Updated: 17 September 2021

=== Most catches in a series ===
Rank	Catches	Player	Matches	Innings	Series
1	5	Ryan Burl	3	3	Pakistan in Zimbabwe in 2021
2	4	Vusi Sibanda	2	2	Zimbabwe in Pakistan in 2015
2	4	Sikandar Raza †	3	3	2016 ICC World Twenty20
2	4	Craig Ervine †	2	2	Zimbabwe in the Netherlands in 2019
2	4	Ryan Burl	4	4	2019-20 Bangladesh Tri-Nation Series
2	4	Milton Shumba	5	5	Zimbabwe in Ireland in 2021
Last Updated: 4 September 2021

== Other records ==
=== Most career matches ===
Rank	Matches	Player	Runs	Wkts	Period
1	133	Sikandar Raza†	3,089	107	2013–2026
2	118	Ryan Burl†	1,948	62	2018–2026
4	93	Richard Ngarava†	108	114	2019–2026
5	89	Blessing Muzarabani†	50	106	2018–2026
3	85	Sean Williams	1,805	49	2006–2025
Last Updated: 24 October 2024

=== Most consecutive career matches ===
Rank	Matches	Player	Period
1	38	Hamilton Masakadza	2006–2015
2	28	Hamilton Masakadza	2016–2019
Last updated: 3 June 2018

=== Most matches as captain ===
Rank	Matches	Player	Won	Lost	Tied	NR	Win %	Period
1	38	Craig Ervine	20	17	0	1	54.05	2021–2023
2	29	Sikandar Raza†	15	14	0	0	51.72	2015–2024
3	19	Hamilton Masakadza	5	13	1	0	28.94	2016–2019
4	18	Elton Chigumbura	2	16	0	0	11.11	2010–2016
4	18	Brendan Taylor	4	14	0	0	22.22	2011–2021
Last Updated: 24 October 2024

=== Most matches won as a captain ===
Rank	Won	Player	Matches	Lost	Tied	NR	Win %	Period
1	20	Craig Ervine	38	17	0	1	54.05	2021–2023
2	15	Sikandar Raza†	29	14	0	0	51.72	2015–2024
3	5	Hamilton Masakadza	19	13	1	0	28.94	2016–2019
4	4	Brendan Taylor	18	14	0	0	22.22	2011–2021
5	3	Prosper Utseya	10	6	1	0	35.00	2006–2010
5	3	Sean Williams	11	8	0	0	27.27	2019–2021
Last Updated: 24 October 2024

=== Youngest players on Debut ===
Rank	Age	Player	Opposition	Venue	Date
1	19 years and 105 days	Tendai Chatara	India	Harare Sports Club, Harare, Zimbabwe	13 June 2010
2	19 years and 109 days	Tadiwanashe Marumani	Pakistan	Harare Sports Club, Harare, Zimbabwe	21 April 2021
3	19 years and 123 days	Dion Myers	Bangladesh	Harare Sports Club, Harare, Zimbabwe	22 July 2021
4	19 years and 187 days	Wessly Madhevere	Bangladesh	Sher-e-Bangla National Cricket Stadium, Mirpur, Bangladesh	9 March 2020
5	20 years and 22 days	Milton Shumba	Pakistan	Rawalpindi Cricket Stadium, Rawalpindi, Pakistan	10 November 2020
Last Updated: 25 July 2021

=== Oldest Players on Debut ===
Rank	Age	Player	Opposition	Venue	Date
1	33 years and 31 days	John Nyumbu	Pakistan	Harare Sports Club, Harare, Zimbabwe	1 July 2018
2	32 years and 120 days	Ray Price	Sri Lanka	Maple Leaf North-West Ground, King City, Canada	10 October 2008
3	31 years and 276 days	Andy Blignaut	New Zealand	Providence Stadium, Providence, Guyana	4 May 2010
4	30 years and 319 days	Gary Brent	Bangladesh	Sheikh Abu Naser Stadium, Khulna, Bangladesh	28 November 2006
5	29 years and 38 days	Innocent Kaia	Scotland	The Grange Club, Edinburgh, Scotland	17 September 2021
Last Updated: 17 September 2021

=== Oldest Players ===
Rank	Age	Player	Opposition	Venue	Date
1	37 years and 63 days	Craig Ervine†	Scotland	Bellerive Oval, Hobart, Australia	21 October 2022
2	36 years and 180 days	Sikandar Raza†	Scotland	Bellerive Oval, Hobart, Australia	21 October 2022
3	36 years and 100 days	Ray Price	South Africa	Mahinda Rajapaksa International Cricket Stadium, Hambantota, Sri Lanka	12 September 2012
4	36 years and 42 days	Hamilton Masakadza	Afghanistan	Zohur Ahmed Chowdhury Stadium, Chittagong, Bangladesh	20 September 2019
5	36 years and 25 days	Sean Williams†	Scotland	Bellerive Oval, Hobart, Australia	21 October 2022
Last Updated: 21 October 2022

== Partnership records ==
=== Highest partnerships by wicket ===
Wicket	Runs	Players		Opposition	Venue	Date
1st Wicket	101	Hamilton Masakadza	Vusi Sibanda	Bangladesh	Sheikh Abu Naser Stadium, Khulna, Bangladesh	15 January 2016
2nd Wicket	107	Brendan Taylor	Chamu Chibhabha	South Africa	De Beers Diamond Oval, Kimberley, South Africa	10 October 2010
3rd Wicket	111*	Craig Ervine	Sean Williams	Ireland	Bready Cricket Club Ground, Magheramason, Northern Ireland	14 July 2019
4th Wicket	103	Sikandar Raza	Sean Williams	Singapore	Queens Sports Club, Bulawayo, Zimbabwe	11 July 2022
5th Wicket	67	Malcolm Waller	Craig Ervine	Bangladesh	Sher-e-Bangla National Cricket Stadium, Mirpur, Bangladesh	13 November 2015
6th Wicket	88*	Milton Shumba	Ryan Burl	Ireland	Castle Avenue, Dublin, Ireland	29 August 2021
7th Wicket	79	Luke Jongwe	Ryan Burl	Bangladesh	Harare Sports Club, Harare, Zimbabwe	2 August 2022
8th Wicket	75	Wellington Masakadza	Clive Madande	Bangladesh	Zohur Ahmed Chowdhury Stadium, Chittagong, Bangladesh	3 May 2024
9th Wicket	54	Wellington Masakadza	Faraz Akram	Bangladesh	Zohur Ahmed Chowdhury Stadium, Chittagong, Bangladesh	7 May 2024
10th Wicket	29	Christopher Mpofu	Donald Tiripano	Netherlands	Hazelaarweg Stadion, Rotterdam, Netherlands	23 June 2019
Last Updated: 7 May 2024

=== Highest partnerships by runs ===
Wicket	Runs	Players		Opposition	Venue	Date
3rd Wicket	111*	Craig Ervine	Sean Williams	Ireland	Bready Cricket Club Ground, Magheramason, Northern Ireland	14 July 2019
2nd Wicket	107	Brendan Taylor	Chamu Chibhabha	South Africa	De Beers Diamond Oval, Kimberley, South Africa	10 October 2010
4th Wicket	103	Sikandar Raza	Sean Williams	Singapore	Queens Sports Club, Bulawayo, Zimbabwe	11 July 2022
1st Wicket	101	Hamilton Masakadza	Vusi Sibanda	Bangladesh	Sheikh Abu Naser Stadium, Khulna, Bangladesh	15 January 2016
1st Wicket	100	Chamu Chibhabha	Sikandar Raza	Afghanistan	Queens Sports Club, Bulawayo, Zimbabwe	26 October 2015
Last Updated: 11 July 2022

== Umpiring records ==
=== Most matches umpired ===
Rank	Matches	Umpire	Period
1	21	Russell Tiffin	2010–2018
2	17	Langton Rusere	2015–2021
3	15	Jeremiah Matibiri	2011–2018
4	9	Iknow Chabi	2018–2021
5	8	Owen Chirombe	2010–2013
Last Updated: 25 July 2021

== See also ==
- List of Twenty20 International records
- List of Test cricket records
- List of Cricket World Cup records
- List of One Day International cricket records
