= Irish cricket team in Zimbabwe in 2022–23 =

International cricket tour

	Zimbabwe	Ireland
- Dates: 12 – 23 January 2023
Captains	Craig Ervine (Note: Sikandar Raza captained Zimbabwe in the second ODI.)	Andrew Balbirnie (Note: Paul Stirling captained Ireland in the last two ODIs.)

One Day International series
- Results: 3-match series drawn 1–1
Most runs	Ryan Burl (100)	Harry Tector (176)
Most wickets	Tendai Chatara (3)	Josh Little (5); Mark Adair (5)
- Player of the series: Harry Tector (Ire)

Twenty20 International series
- Results: Zimbabwe won the 3-match series 2–1
Most runs	Craig Ervine (100)	Harry Tector (78)
Most wickets	Ryan Burl (7)	Harry Tector (5)
- Player of the series: Ryan Burl (Zim)

The Ireland cricket team toured Zimbabwe in January 2023 to play three One Day International (ODI) and three Twenty20 International (T20I) matches. Zimbabwe won the T20I series 2–1. The ODI series was drawn 1–1 after the final match ended with no result due to rain.

== Squads ==
ODIs		T20Is	
Zimbabwe	Ireland	Zimbabwe	Ireland
Craig Ervine (c); Gary Ballance; Ryan Burl; Tendai Chatara; Chamu Chibhabha; Brad Evans; Luke Jongwe; Innocent Kaia; Clive Madande (wk); Wessly Madhevere; Tadiwanashe Marumani; Wellington Masakadza; Brandon Mavuta; Richard Ngarava; Victor Nyauchi; Sikandar Raza	Andrew Balbirnie (c); Paul Stirling (vc); Mark Adair; Curtis Campher; Murray Commins; Gareth Delany; George Dockrell; Stephen Doheny (wk); Graham Hume; Tyrone Kane; Josh Little; Andy McBrine; Barry McCarthy; Harry Tector; Lorcan Tucker (wk)	Craig Ervine (c); Gary Ballance; Ryan Burl; Tendai Chatara; Brad Evans; Luke Jongwe; Innocent Kaia; Clive Madande (wk); Wessly Madhevere; Tadiwanashe Marumani; Wellington Masakadza; Tony Munyonga; Richard Ngarava; Victor Nyauchi; Sean Williams	Andrew Balbirnie (c); Mark Adair; Ross Adair; Curtis Campher; Gareth Delany; George Dockrell; Stephen Doheny (wk); Fionn Hand; Graham Hume; Tyrone Kane; Barry McCarthy; Neil Rock (wk); Harry Tector; ~~Lorcan Tucker (wk)~~; Ben White

Before the start of the series, Ross Adair replaced Lorcan Tucker in Ireland's T20I squad, as Tucker was released to play in the 2022–23 International League T20 (ILT20). Paul Stirling and Josh Little were also missing from Ireland's T20I squad due to their participation in the ILT20 and the 2022–23 SA20, respectively, while Sikander Raza was unavailable for Zimbabwe due to the ILT20. Zimbabwe included former England player Gary Ballance in their T20I squad. Ireland captain Andrew Balbirnie suffered a concussion during the first ODI, after scoring his eighth century in the format, which ruled him out of the remainder of the series. Murray Commins replaced Balbirnie in Ireland's squad for the last two ODIs, and Paul Stirling took over as captain.

== T20I series ==
=== 1st T20I ===
12 January 2023
13:00
Scorecard

Ireland; 114 (19.2 overs)	v	Zimbabwe; 118/5 (18 overs)
Gareth Delany 24 (20); Ryan Burl 3/29 (4 overs)		Sean Williams 34* (30); Mark Adair 2/12 (3 overs)

Zimbabwe won by 5 wickets
Harare Sports Club, Harare
Umpires: Iknow Chabi (Zim) and Langton Rusere (Zim)
Player of the match: Ryan Burl (Zim)

- Zimbabwe won the toss and elected to field.
- Gary Ballance (Zim), Ross Adair and Stephen Doheny (Ire) all made their T20I debuts.

=== 2nd T20I ===
14 January 2023
13:00
Scorecard

Zimbabwe; 144 (20 overs)	v	Ireland; 150/4 (19.4 ovres)
Craig Ervine 42 (40); Graham Hume 3/17 (4 overs)		Ross Adair 65 (47); Ryan Burl 2/26 (4 overs)

Ireland won by 6 wickets
Harare Sports Club, Harare
Umpires: Iknow Chabi (Zim) and Christopher Phiri (Zim)
Player of the match: Ross Adair (Ire)

- Ireland won the toss and elected to field.

=== 3rd T20I ===
15 January 2023
13:00
Scorecard

Ireland; 141/9 (20 overs)	v	Zimbabwe; 146/6 (19 overs)
Harry Tector 47 (38); Wesley Madhevere 2/8 (2 overs)		Craig Ervine 54 (43); Ben White 2/26 (3 overs)

Zimbabwe won by 4 wickets
Harare Sports Club, Harare
Umpires: Forster Mutizwa (Zim) and Langton Rusere (Zim)
Player of the match: Ryan Burl (Zim)

- Zimbabwe won the toss and elected to field.

== ODI series ==
=== 1st ODI ===
18 January 2023
09:15
Scorecard

Ireland; 288/4 (50 overs)	v	Zimbabwe; 214/7 (37 overs)
Andrew Balbirnie 121* (137); Victor Nyauchi 2/65 (10 overs)		Ryan Burl 59 (41); Mark Adair 2/40 (8 overs)

Zimbabwe won by 3 wickets (DLS method)
Harare Sports Club, Harare
Umpires: Iknow Chabi (Zim) and Michael Gough (Eng)
Player of the match: Ryan Burl (Zim)

- Zimbabwe won the toss and elected to field.
- Zimbabwe were set a revised target of 214 runs in 37 overs due to rain.
- Stephen Doheny (Ire) made his ODI debut.
- Gary Ballance made his ODI debut for Zimbabwe after previously playing 16 ODIs for England, becoming the 16th cricketer to represent two international teams in ODIs.

=== 2nd ODI ===
21 January 2023
09:15
Scorecard

Ireland; 294/7 (50 overs)	v	Zimbabwe; 248 (47.3 overs)
Stephen Doheny 84 (111); Tendai Chatara 3/51 (10 overs)		Gary Ballance 52 (67); Josh Little 4/38 (10 overs)

Ireland won by 46 runs
Harare Sports Club, Harare
Umpires: Michael Gough (Eng) and Forster Mutizwa (Zim)
Player of the match: Josh Little (Ire)

- Zimbabwe won the toss and elected to field.
- Murray Commins (Ire) made his ODI debut.

=== 3rd ODI ===
23 January 2023
09:15
Scorecard

Zimbabwe; 55/1 (13 overs)	v	Ireland
Innocent Kaia 24* (32); Mark Adair 1/15 (4 overs)

No result
Harare Sports Club, Harare
Umpires: Michael Gough (Eng) and Langton Rusere (Zim)

- Zimbabwe won the toss and elected to bat.
- No further play was possible due to rain.
