= Afghan cricket team in Zimbabwe in 2022 =

International cricket tour

Afghan cricket team Zimbabwe in 2022
	Zimbabwe	Afghanistan
- Dates: 4 – 14 June 2022
Captains	Craig Ervine	Hashmatullah Shahidi (ODIs); Mohammad Nabi (T20Is)

One Day International series
- Results: Afghanistan won the 3-match series 3–0
Most runs	Sikandar Raza (145)	Rahmat Shah (198)
Most wickets	Blessing Muzarabani (7)	Mohammad Nabi (8)
- Player of the series: Rahmat Shah (Afg)

Twenty20 International series
- Results: Afghanistan won the 3-match series 3–0
Most runs	Sikandar Raza (86)	Najibullah Zadran (103)
Most wickets	Ryan Burl (6)	Noor Ahmad (4); Rashid Khan (4); Nijat Masood (4)
- Player of the series: Najibullah Zadran (Afg)

The Afghanistan cricket team toured Zimbabwe in June 2022 to play three One Day International (ODI) matches and three Twenty20 International (T20I) matches. The ODI series formed part of the inaugural 2020–2023 ICC Cricket World Cup Super League. In April 2022, Zimbabwe Cricket confirmed the fixtures for the tour. The following month, the tour itinerary was changed slightly, bringing the matches forward by one week and reducing the number of T20Is from five to three.

Afghanistan won the opening ODI match by 60 runs. Afghanistan also won the second ODI, with an unbeaten century from Ibrahim Zadran, to take an unassailable lead in the three-match series. Afghanistan won the third and final ODI by four wickets to win the series 3–0. In the T20I series, Afghanistan won the first match by six wickets, and the second T20I match by 21 runs to win the series with a match to spare. Afghanistan won the final match of the tour by 35 runs to win the T20I series 3–0.

== Background ==
Afghanistan were originally scheduled to tour Zimbabwe in July and August 2020 to play five Twenty20 International (T20I) matches, subject to lockdown restrictions being lifted due to the COVID-19 pandemic. The tour was not part of the Future Tours Programme. In June 2020, the Zimbabwe cricket team resumed their training, after passing COVID-19 tests. On 20 July 2020, Zimbabwe Cricket (ZC) requested clearance from the government for the tour to go ahead, with a spokesperson from ZC stating that Afghanistan were still committed to touring. However, on 8 August 2020, the tour was called off, following an increase of COVID-19 cases in Zimbabwe.

A revised tour was scheduled to take place in February 2022. However, in January 2022, both cricket boards agreed to postpone the tour after Zimbabwe Cricket could not secure all the broadcasting services including the Decision Review System. Despite the second postponement, both cricket boards were working to reschedule the matches as soon as possible. In April 2022, the rescheduled dates for the tour were confirmed.

== Squads ==
ODIs		T20Is	
Zimbabwe	Afghanistan	Zimbabwe	Afghanistan
Craig Ervine (c); Ryan Burl; Regis Chakabva; Tendai Chatara; Tanaka Chivanga; Luke Jongwe; Innocent Kaia; Takudzwanashe Kaitano; Clive Madande; Wesley Madhevere; Blessing Muzarabani; Dion Myers; Ainsley Ndlovu; Sikandar Raza; Milton Shumba; Donald Tiripano	Hashmatullah Shahidi (c); Rahmat Shah (vc); Fareed Ahmad; Yamin Ahmadzai; Ikram Alikhil (wk); Fazalhaq Farooqi; Rahmanullah Gurbaz (wk); Riaz Hassan; Rashid Khan; Mohammad Nabi; Azmatullah Omarzai; Mujeeb Ur Rahman; Zia-ur-Rehman; Shahidullah; Ibrahim Zadran; Najibullah Zadran	Craig Ervine (c); Ryan Burl; Regis Chakabva; Tendai Chatara; Luke Jongwe; Innocent Kaia; Clive Madande; Wesley Madhevere; Tadiwanashe Marumani; Blessing Muzarabani; Dion Myers; Ainsley Ndlovu; Sikandar Raza; Milton Shumba; Donald Tiripano	Mohammad Nabi (c); Najibullah Zadran (vc); Fareed Ahmad; Noor Ahmad; Sharafuddin Ashraf; Fazalhaq Farooqi; Usman Ghani; Rahmanullah Gurbaz (wk); Ihsanullah; Karim Janat; Rashid Khan; Nijat Masood; Azmatullah Omarzai; Darwish Rasooli; Afsar Zazai (wk); Hazratullah Zazai

Afghanistan also named Noor Ahmad and Nijat Masood as reserves in their ODI squad, and Zahir Khan and Sayed Shirzad as reserves in their T20I squad.

== Warm-up match ==
2 June 2022
09:15
Scorecard

Afghanistan; 272/6 (50 overs)	v	Zimbabwe Select XI; 204 (44.4 overs)
Rahmat Shah 81 (83); Tony Munyonga 2/33 (7 overs)		Innocent Kaia 53 (66); Mujeeb Ur Rahman 2/18 (9 overs)

Afghanistan won by 68 runs
Old Hararians, Harare
Umpires: David Shawane (Zim) and Percival Sizara (Zim)

- Afghanistan won the toss and elected to bat.

== ODI series ==
=== 1st ODI ===
4 June 2022
09:15
Scorecard

Afghanistan; 276/5 (50 overs)	v	Zimbabwe; 216 (50 overs)
Rahmat Shah 94 (120); Blessing Muzarabani 4/52 (9 overs)		Sikandar Raza 67 (78); Mohammad Nabi 4/34 (10 overs)

Afghanistan won by 60 runs
Harare Sports Club, Harare
Umpires: Marais Erasmus (SA) and Langton Rusere (Zim)
Player of the match: Rahmat Shah (Afg)

- Zimbabwe won the toss and elected to field.
- Tanaka Chivanga and Innocent Kaia (Zim) both made their ODI debuts.
- World Cup Super League points: Afghanistan 10, Zimbabwe 0.

=== 2nd ODI ===
6 June 2022
09:15
Scorecard

Zimbabwe; 228 (50 overs)	v	Afghanistan; 229/2 (44.3 overs)
Innocent Kaia 63 (74); Fareed Ahmad 3/56 (10 overs)		Ibrahim Zadran 120* (141); Donald Tiripano 1/32 (6 overs)

Afghanistan won by 8 wickets
Harare Sports Club, Harare
Umpires: Iknow Chabi (Zim) and Marais Erasmus (SA)
Player of the match: Ibrahim Zadran (Afg)

- Afghanistan won the toss and elected to field.
- Ibrahim Zadran (Afg) scored his first century in ODIs.
- World Cup Super League points: Afghanistan 10, Zimbabwe 0.

=== 3rd ODI ===
9 June 2022
09:15
Scorecard

Zimbabwe; 135 (44.5 overs)	v	Afghanistan; 137/6 (37.4 overs)
Sikandar Raza 38 (77); Rashid Khan 3/31 (7.5 overs)		Hashmatullah Shahidi 38 (70); Blessing Muzarabani 2/18 (10 overs)

Afghanistan won by 4 wickets
Harare Sports Club, Harare
Umpires: Marais Erasmus (SA) and Langton Rusere (Zim)
Player of the match: Rashid Khan (Afg)

- Afghanistan won the toss and elected to field.
- World Cup Super League points: Afghanistan 10, Zimbabwe 0.

== T20I series ==
=== 1st T20I ===
11 June 2022
13:00
Scorecard

Zimbabwe; 159/8 (20 overs)	v	Afghanistan; 160/4 (19.2 overs)
Sikandar Raza 45 (31); Nijat Masood 3/39 (4 overs)		Hazratullah Zazai 45 (26); Ryan Burl 3/14 (4 overs)

Afghanistan won by 6 wickets
Harare Sports Club, Harare
Umpires: Iknow Chabi (Zim) Langton Rusere (Zim)
Player of the match: Najibullah Zadran (Afg)

- Zimbabwe won the toss and elected to bat.
- Nijat Masood (Afg) made his T20I debut.

=== 2nd T20I ===
12 June 2022
13:00
Scorecard

Afghanistan; 170/5 (20 overs)	v	Zimbabwe; 149/7 (20 overs)
Najibullah Zadran 57 (46); Tendai Chatara 2/33 (4 overs)		Innocent Kaia 54 (57); Rashid Khan 2/32 (4 overs)

Afghanistan won by 21 runs
Harare Sports Club, Harare
Umpires: Iknow Chabi (Zim) Forster Mutizwa (Zim)
Player of the match: Fazalhaq Farooqi (Afg)

- Afghanistan won the toss and elected to bat.

=== 3rd T20I ===
14 June 2022
13:00
Scorecard

Afghanistan; 125/8 (20 overs)	v	Zimbabwe; 90/9 (20 overs)
Mohammad Nabi 31 (30); Sikandar Raza 2/18 (4 overs)		Ryan Burl 15 (24); Noor Ahmad 4/10 (4 overs)

Afghanistan won by 35 runs
Harare Sports Club, Harare
Umpires: Christopher Phiri (Zim) Langton Rusere (Zim)
Player of the match: Noor Ahmad (Afg)

- Afghanistan won the toss and elected to bat.
- Clive Madande (Zim), Noor Ahmad and Ihsanullah (Afg) all made their T20I debuts.
