= Zimbabwean cricket team in Namibia in 2023–24 =

International cricket tour

	Namibia	Zimbabwe
- Dates: 24 – 30 October 2023
Captains	Gerhard Erasmus	Craig Ervine

Twenty20 International series
- Results: Namibia won the 5-match series 3–2
Most runs	Nikolaas Davin (203)	Sikandar Raza (177)
Most wickets	Gerhard Erasmus (9)	Tendai Chatara (5); Richard Ngarava (5)
- Player of the series: Sikandar Raza (Zim)

The Zimbabwe men's cricket team toured Namibia in October 2023 to play five Twenty20 International (T20I) matches. This was the first bilateral series between the two teams to be hosted in Namibia. The only previous T20I series between the two sides was played in Zimbabwe in 2022. The series formed part of both teams' preparations for the Africa World Cup Qualifier.

After losing the opening game, Sikandar Raza scored consecutive half centuries to help put Zimbabwe into a 2–1 series lead. Namibia won the fourth T20I by 7 wickets to level the series at 2–2, ensuring that the series would be decided by the final match. Namibia won the deciding fifth T20I to seal the series 3–2. Having been bowled out for 101 in the first innings, the hosts made a comeback with the ball as they restricted Zimbabwe to a total of 93.

== Squads ==
Namibia	Zimbabwe
Gerhard Erasmus (c); JJ Smit (vc); Karl Birkenstock; Niko Davin; Shaun Fouché; Jan Frylinck; Zane Green (wk); Handre Klazinge; Malan Kruger; Jean-Pierre Kotze; Michael van Lingen; Tangeni Lungameni; Jan Nicol Loftie-Eaton; Bernard Scholtz; Ben Shikongo; Mauritius Ngupita	Craig Ervine (c); Faraz Akram; Ryan Burl; Tendai Chatara; Brad Evans; Luke Jongwe; Innocent Kaia; Tinashe Kamunhukamwe; Clive Madande (wk); Wesley Madhevere; Wellington Masakadza; Nyasha Mayavo (wk); Carl Mumba; Richard Ngarava; Sikandar Raza; Nick Welch; Sean Williams

== T20I series ==
=== 1st T20I ===
24 October 2023
14:00
Scorecard

Zimbabwe; 121/9 (20 overs)	v	Namibia; 122/3 (13.4 overs)
Sikandar Raza 39 (35); Gerhard Erasmus 3/15 (4 overs)		Niko Davin 80* (44); Richard Ngarava 2/15 (3 overs)

Namibia won by 7 wickets
Wanderers Cricket Ground, Windhoek
Umpires: Andrew Louw (Nam) and Claus Schumacher (Nam)
Player of the match: Niko Davin (Nam)

- Zimbabwe won the toss and elected to bat.
- Nick Welch (Zim) made his T20I debut.

=== 2nd T20I ===
25 October 2023
14:00
Scorecard

Namibia; 198/3 (20 overs)	v	Zimbabwe; 200/5 (20 overs)
Michael van Lingen 67 (37); Ryan Burl 1/30 (3 overs)		Sikandar Raza 82* (35); Gerhard Erasmus 2/29 (4 overs)

Zimbabwe won by 5 wickets
Wanderers Cricket Ground, Windhoek
Umpires: Ewoud Lassen (Nam) and Claus Schumacher (Nam)
Player of the match: Sikandar Raza (Zim)

- Zimbabwe won the toss and elected to field.

=== 3rd T20I ===
27 October 2023
14:00
Scorecard

Namibia; 138/6 (20 overs)	v	Zimbabwe; 144/4 (18.4 overs)
Jan Frylinck 41 (39); Luke Jongwe 2/33 (4 overs)		Sikandar Raza 52 (36); Jan Frylinck 1/12 (3 overs)

Zimbabwe won by 6 wickets
United Ground, Windhoek
Umpires: Andrew Louw (Nam) and Claus Schumacher (Nam)
Player of the match: Sikandar Raza (Zim)

- Namibia won the toss and elected to bat.
- Handre Klazinge (Nam) made his T20I debut.

=== 4th T20I ===
29 October 2023
11:00
Scorecard

Zimbabwe; 153/6 (20 overs)	v	Namibia; 154/3 (18.4 overs)
Craig Ervine 54* (43); Gerhard Erasmus 2/21 (4 overs)		Michael van Lingen 47 (27); Ryan Burl 2/22 (4 overs)

Namibia won by 7 wickets
United Ground, Windhoek
Umpires: Esau Heynes (Nam) and Andrew Louw (Nam)
Player of the match: Gerhard Erasmus (Nam)

- Zimbabwe won the toss and elected to bat.
- Nyasha Mayavo (Zim) made his T20I debut.

=== 5th T20I ===
30 October 2023
15:00
Scorecard

Namibia; 101 (18.4 overs)	v	Zimbabwe; 93 (19.2 overs)
JJ Smit 29 (28); Sikandar Raza 4/24 (4 overs)		Luke Jongwe 24 (16); Bernard Scholtz 3/11 (4 overs)

Namibia won by 8 runs
United Ground, Windhoek
Umpires: Ewoud Lassen (Nam) and Claus Schumacher (Nam)
Player of the match: JJ Smit (Nam)

- Zimbabwe won the toss and elected to field.
