= Zimbabwean cricket team in Australia in 2022 =

International cricket tour

	Australia	Zimbabwe
- Dates: 28 August – 3 September 2022
Captains	Aaron Finch	Regis Chakabva

One Day International series
- Results: Australia won the 3-match series 2–1
Most runs	David Warner (164)	Tadiwanashe Marumani (84)
Most wickets	Cameron Green (8)	Ryan Burl (8)
- Player of the series: Adam Zampa (Aus)

The Zimbabwe cricket team toured Australia in August and September 2022 to play three One Day International (ODI) matches. The ODI series formed part of the inaugural 2020–2023 ICC Cricket World Cup Super League. Zimbabwe last toured Australia in the 2003–04 cricket season to play two Test matches and an ODI tri-series along with India. In May 2022, Cricket Australia confirmed the fixtures for the tour, with all the matches taking place at the Riverway Stadium in Townsville.

== Background ==
Originally, the fixtures were scheduled to be played in June 2020, but they were moved to early August 2020 by Cricket Australia. The revised dates clashed with the inaugural season of The Hundred in England, with several Australian cricketers initially expected to take part in the tournament. However, The Hundred was postponed to 2021 due to the COVID-19 pandemic. The pandemic also put Zimbabwe's tour to Australia in doubt, but on 28 May 2020, Cricket Australia confirmed the fixtures for the series. The series was put into further doubt in June, after Cricket Australia announced several cost-saving measures. On 20 June 2020, Cricket Australia's interim chief executive officer, Nick Hockley, said that getting clarity on the status of the tour was on his priority list. However, on 30 June 2020, the tour was postponed due to the pandemic.

In February 2022, Zimbabwe Cricket were looking at the possibility of playing the matches later that year, with the addition of three Twenty20 International (T20I) matches or a Test match.

== Squads ==
Australia	Zimbabwe
Aaron Finch (c); Sean Abbott; Ashton Agar; Alex Carey (wk); Cameron Green; Josh Hazlewood; Josh Inglis (wk); Marnus Labuschagne; Mitchell Marsh; Glenn Maxwell; Steve Smith; Mitchell Starc; Marcus Stoinis; David Warner; Adam Zampa	Regis Chakabva (c, wk); Ryan Burl; Brad Evans; Luke Jongwe; Innocent Kaia; Takudzwanashe Kaitano; Clive Madande (wk); Wesley Madhevere; Tadiwanashe Marumani (wk); Tony Munyonga; Blessing Muzarabani; Richard Ngarava; Victor Nyauchi; Sikandar Raza; Sean Williams

Zimbabwe Cricket also named Tanaka Chivanga and John Masara as reserves. Josh Inglis was added to Australia's squad after the first ODI in place of Mitchell Marsh.

== ODI series ==
=== 1st ODI ===
28 August 2022
09:40
Scorecard

Zimbabwe; 200 (47.3 overs)	v	Australia; 5/201 (33.3 overs)
Wesley Madhevere 72 (91); Cameron Green 5/33 (9 overs)		David Warner 57 (66); Ryan Burl 3/60 (7 overs)

Australia won by 5 wickets
Riverway Stadium, Townsville
Umpires: Sam Nogajski (Aus) and Rod Tucker (Aus)
Player of the match: Cameron Green (Aus)

- Australia won the toss and elected to field.
- Cameron Green (Aus) took his first five-wicket haul in ODIs.
- World Cup Super League points: Australia 10, Zimbabwe 0.

=== 2nd ODI ===
31 August 2022
09:40
Scorecard

Zimbabwe; 96 (27.5 overs)	v	Australia; 2/100 (14.4 overs)
Sean Williams 29 (45); Adam Zampa 3/21 (3.5 overs)		Steve Smith 47* (41); Richard Ngarava 2/16 (4 overs)

Australia won by 8 wickets
Riverway Stadium, Townsville
Umpires: Donovan Koch (Aus) and Paul Reiffel (Aus)
Player of the match: Mitchell Starc (Aus)

- Australia won the toss and elected to field.
- World Cup Super League points: Australia 10, Zimbabwe 0.

=== 3rd ODI ===
3 September 2022
09:40
Scorecard

Australia; 141 (31 overs)	v	Zimbabwe; 7/142 (39 overs)
David Warner 94 (96); Ryan Burl 5/10 (3 overs)		Regis Chakabva 37* (72); Josh Hazlewood 3/30 (10 overs)

Zimbabwe won by 3 wickets
Riverway Stadium, Townsville
Umpires: Rod Tucker (Aus) and Paul Wilson (Aus)
Player of the match: Ryan Burl (Zim)

- Zimbabwe won the toss and elected to field.
- Ryan Burl (Zim) took his first five-wicket haul in ODIs. His 5/10 was the best bowling by a Zimbabwe player against Australia in ODIs.
- Mitchell Starc (Aus) took his 200th ODI wicket, and is the fastest in terms of matches played (102) and deliveries bowled (5240).
- World Cup Super League points: Zimbabwe 10, Australia 0.
