= Namibian cricket team in Zimbabwe in 2022 =

International cricket tour

	Zimbabwe	Namibia
- Dates: 17 – 24 May 2022
Captains	Craig Ervine (Note: Regis Chakabva captained Zimbabwe for the fifth T20I.)	Gerhard Erasmus

Twenty20 International series
- Results: Namibia won the 5-match series 3–2
Most runs	Wesley Madhevere (163)	Craig Williams (139)
Most wickets	Sikandar Raza (6); Tendai Chatara (6)	Bernard Scholtz (7)

The Namibia cricket team toured Zimbabwe in May 2022 to play five Twenty20 International (T20I) matches. The matches were played at the Queens Sports Club in Bulawayo, and it was the first men's T20I series between Zimbabwe and Namibia.

Zimbabwe won the opening match of the series by seven runs, with captain Craig Ervine scoring an unbeaten 55 runs. Namibia then won the second match by eight wickets to level the series, and recorded their first win against Zimbabwe in international cricket. Zimbabwe won the third T20I by eight wickets, with Wesley Madhevere finishing 73 not out. Namibia went on to win the fourth match, with captain Gerhard Erasmus scoring 59 not out. Zane Green hit the winning runs off the last ball of the game, to level the series at 2–2, with one match to play. In the fifth and final match, Namibia won by 32 runs, to win the series 3–2. It was the first time that Namibia had won a bilateral series against a Full Member side.

== Squads ==
T20Is
Zimbabwe	Namibia
Craig Ervine (c); Ryan Burl; Regis Chakabva; Tendai Chatara; Tanaka Chivanga; Brad Evans; Luke Jongwe; Innocent Kaia; Wesley Madhevere; Tadiwanashe Marumani; Ernest Masuku; Brandon Mavuta; Tony Munyonga; Richmond Mutumbami; Victor Nyauchi; Sikandar Raza; Milton Shumba; Donald Tiripano	Gerhard Erasmus (c); JJ Smit (vc); Jan Frylinck; Zane Green; Divan la Cock; Dylan Leicher; Jan Nicol Loftie-Eaton; Tangeni Lungameni; Bernard Scholtz; Ben Shikongo; Ruben Trumpelmann; Michael van Lingen; David Wiese; Craig Williams; Pikky Ya France

== T20I series ==
=== 1st T20I ===
17 May 2022
13:00
Scorecard

Zimbabwe; 153/4 (20 overs)	v	Namibia; 146/5 (20 overs)
Craig Ervine 55* (39); Bernard Scholtz 2/19 (4 overs)		Divan la Cock 66 (43); Milton Shumba 3/16 (3 overs)

Zimbabwe won by 7 runs
Queens Sports Club, Bulawayo
Umpires: Iknow Chabi (Zim) and Langton Rusere (Zim)
Player of the match: Craig Ervine (Zim)

- Zimbabwe won the toss and elected to bat.
- Tanaka Chivanga (Zim) and Divan la Cock (Nam) both made their T20I debuts.

=== 2nd T20I ===
19 May 2022
13:00
Scorecard

Zimbabwe; 122/8 (20 overs)	v	Namibia; 124/2 (18 overs)
Milton Shumba 29 (26); David Wiese 3/27 (4 overs)		Craig Williams 62* (53); Luke Jongwe 1/16 (3 overs)

Namibia won by 8 wickets
Queens Sports Club, Bulawayo
Umpires: Christopher Phiri (Zim) and Langton Rusere (Zim)
Player of the match: Craig Williams (Nam)

- Zimbabwe won the toss and elected to bat.

=== 3rd T20I ===
21 May 2022
13:00
Scorecard

Namibia; 128/8 (20 overs)	v	Zimbabwe; 129/2 (17.1 overs)
Jan Nicol Loftie-Eaton 28 (23); Sikandar Raza 3/16 (4 overs)		Wesley Madhevere 73* (61); Jan Frylinck 1/21 (3 overs)

Zimbabwe won by 8 wickets
Queens Sports Club, Bulawayo
Umpires: Forster Mutizwa (Zim) and Christopher Phiri (Zim)
Player of the match: Wesley Madhevere (Zim)

- Namibia won the toss and elected to bat.
- Brad Evans (Zim) made his T20I debut.

=== 4th T20I ===
22 May 2022
13:00
Scorecard

Zimbabwe; 157/8 (20 overs)	v	Namibia; 161/4 (20 overs)
Wesley Madhevere 50 (32); Bernard Scholtz 3/25 (4 overs)		Gerhard Erasmus 59* (43); Luke Jongwe 2/35 (4 overs)

Namibia won by 6 wickets
Queens Sports Club, Bulawayo
Umpires: Iknow Chabi (Zim) and Forster Mutizwa (Zim)
Player of the match: Gerhard Erasmus (Nam)

- Namibia won the toss and elected to field.
- Victor Nyauchi (Zim) made his T20I debut.

=== 5th T20I ===
24 May 2022
13:00
Scorecard

Namibia; 127/8 (20 overs)	v	Zimbabwe; 95 (19.1 overs)
Craig Williams 48 (39); Wesley Madhevere 2/15 (4 overs)		Tony Munyonga 28 (31); Gerhard Erasmus 2/9 (3 overs)

Namibia won by 32 runs
Queens Sports Club, Bulawayo
Umpires: Iknow Chabi (Zim) and Langton Rusere (Zim)
Player of the match: Craig Williams (Nam)

- Zimbabwe won the toss and elected to field.
- Regis Chakabva captained Zimbabwe for the first time in T20Is.
