= Zimbabwean cricket team in Sri Lanka in 2023–24 =

International cricket tour

	Sri Lanka	Zimbabwe
- Dates: 6 – 18 January 2024
Captains	Kusal Mendis (ODIs); Wanindu Hasaranga (T20Is)	Craig Ervine (ODIs); Sikandar Raza (T20Is)

One Day International series
- Results: Sri Lanka won the 3-match series 2–0
Most runs	Kusal Mendis (129)	Craig Ervine (82)
Most wickets	Wanindu Hasaranga (7)	Richard Ngarava (8)
- Player of the series: Janith Liyanage (SL)

Twenty20 International series
- Results: Sri Lanka won the 3-match series 2–1
Most runs	Angelo Mathews (112)	Sikandar Raza (80)
Most wickets	Wanindu Hasaranga (7)	Blessing Muzarabani (4)
- Player of the series: Angelo Mathews (SL)

The Zimbabwe cricket team toured Sri Lanka in January 2024 to play three One Day International (ODI) and three Twenty20 International (T20I) matches. The T20I series was part of Sri Lanka's preparation for the 2024 ICC Men's T20 World Cup tournament.

The matches had initially been pencilled in to take place in Dambulla and Kandy, however with the Under-19 World Cup was shifted to South Africa, the matches shifted to Colombo.

== Squads ==
Sri Lanka		Zimbabwe	
ODIs	T20Is	ODIs	T20Is
Kusal Mendis (c); Charith Asalanka (vc); Sahan Arachchige; Dushmantha Chameera; Akila Dananjaya; Shevon Daniel; Avishka Fernando; Nuwanidu Fernando; Wanindu Hasaranga; Janith Liyanage; Pramod Madushan; Dilshan Madushanka; ~~Pathum Nissanka~~; Sadeera Samarawickrama; Dasun Shanaka; Maheesh Theekshana; Jeffrey Vandersay; Dunith Wellalage	Wanindu Hasaranga (c); Charith Asalanka (vc); Dushmantha Chameera; Akila Dananjaya; Dilshan Madushanka; Angelo Mathews; Kamindu Mendis; Kusal Mendis; Pathum Nissanka; Matheesha Pathirana; Kusal Perera; Sadeera Samarawickrama; Dasun Shanaka; Dhananjaya de Silva; Maheesh Theekshana; Nuwan Thushara	Craig Ervine (c); Faraz Akram; Ryan Burl; Joylord Gumbie; Luke Jongwe; Takudzwanashe Kaitano; Tinashe Kamunhukamwe; Clive Madande; Wellington Masakadza; Tapiwa Mufudza; Tony Munyonga; Blessing Muzarabani; Richard Ngarava; Sikandar Raza; Milton Shumba	Sikandar Raza (c); Brian Bennett; Ryan Burl; Craig Ervine; Joylord Gumbie; Luke Jongwe; Tinashe Kamunhukamwe; Clive Madande; Wellington Masakadza; Carl Mumba; Tony Munyonga; Blessing Muzarabani; Ainsley Ndlovu; Richard Ngarava; Milton Shumba

On 30 December 2023, Sri Lanka Cricket announced the preliminary squads. Kusal Mendis and Wanindu Hasaranga named captain for ODI and T20I series respectively, while Charith Asalanka was named vice-captain for both series. On 5 January 2024, Pathum Nissanka was ruled out of ODI series due to suspected dengue and replaced by Shevon Daniel in Sri Lanka's ODI squad.

== ODI series ==
=== 1st ODI ===
6 January 2024
14:30 (D/N)
Scorecard

Sri Lanka; 273/9 (50 overs)	v	Zimbabwe; 12/2 (4 overs)
Charith Asalanka 101 (95); Richard Ngarava 2/39 (6.4 overs)		Milton Shumba 2* (3); Dilshan Madushanka 2/0 (2 overs)

No result
R. Premadasa Stadium, Colombo
Umpires: Ruchira Palliyaguruge (SL) and Alex Wharf (Eng)

- Sri Lanka won the toss and elected to bat.
- Rain during Zimbabwe's innings prevented any further play.
- Faraz Akram, Tapiwa Mufudza (Zim) and Janith Liyanage (SL) all made their ODI debuts.
- Richard Ngarava (Zim) took his 50th wicket in ODIs.

=== 2nd ODI ===
8 January 2024
14:30 (D/N)
Scorecard

Zimbabwe; 208 (44.4 overs)	v	Sri Lanka; 211/8 (49 overs)
Craig Ervine 82 (102); Maheesh Theekshana 4/31 (9.4 overs)		Janith Liyanage 95 (127); Richard Ngarava 5/32 (10 overs)

Sri Lanka won by 2 wickets
R. Premadasa Stadium, Colombo
Umpires: Marais Erasmus (SA) and Raveendra Wimalasiri (SL)
Player of the match: Janith Liyanage (SL)

- Zimbabwe won the toss and elected to bat.
- Richard Ngarava (Zim) took his first five-wicket haul in ODIs.

=== 3rd ODI ===
11 January 2024
14:30 (D/N)
Scorecard

Zimbabwe; 96 (22.5 overs)	v	Sri Lanka; 97/2 (16.4 overs)
Joylord Gumbie 29 (34); Wanindu Hasaranga 7/19 (5.5 overs)		Kusal Mendis 66 (51); Wellington Masakadza 1/13 (2.1 overs)

Sri Lanka won by 8 wickets (DLS method)
R. Premadasa Stadium, Colombo
Umpires: Ruchira Palliyaguruge (SL) and Alex Wharf (Eng)
Player of the match: Wanindu Hasaranga (SL)

- Sri Lanka won the toss and elected to bat.
- Sri Lanka were set a revised target of 97 runs in 27 overs due to rain.
- Shevon Daniel (SL) made his ODI debut.

== T20I series ==
=== 1st T20I ===
14 January 2024
19:00 (N)
Scorecard

Zimbabwe; 143/5 (20 overs)	v	Sri Lanka; 144/7 (20 overs)
Sikandar Raza 62 (42); Maheesh Theekshana 2/16 (4 overs)		Angelo Mathews 46 (38); Sikandar Raza 3/13 (4 overs)

Sri Lanka won by 3 wickets
R. Premadasa Stadium, Colombo
Umpires: Ruchira Palliyaguruge (SL) and Raveendra Wimalasiri (SL)
Player of the match: Angelo Mathews (SL)

- Sri Lanka won the toss and elected to field.
- Wanindu Hasaranga captained Sri Lanka for the first time in T20Is.
- Sikandar Raza (Zim) became the first male cricketer to score half-centuries in five consecutive T20I innings.

=== 2nd T20I ===
16 January 2024
19:00 (N)
Scorecard

Sri Lanka; 173/6 (20 overs)	v	Zimbabwe; 178/6 (19.5 overs)
Charith Asalanka 69 (39); Luke Jongwe 2/32 (2 overs)		Craig Ervine 70 (54); Maheesh Theekshana 2/25 (4 overs)

Zimbabwe won by 4 wickets
R. Premadasa Stadium, Colombo
Umpires: Prageeth Rambukwella (SL) and Raveendra Wimalasiri (SL)
Player of the match: Luke Jongwe (Zim)

- Zimbabwe won the toss and elected to field.
- This was the first win for Zimbabwe against Sri Lanka in T20Is.

=== 3rd T20I ===
18 January 2024
19:00 (N)
Scorecard

Zimbabwe; 82 (14.1 overs)	v	Sri Lanka; 88/1 (10.5 overs)
Brian Bennett 29 (12); Wanindu Hasaranga 4/15 (4 overs)		Pathum Nissanka 39* (23); Sean Williams 1/13 (2 overs)

Sri lanka won by 9 wickets
R. Premadasa Stadium, Colombo
Umpires: Lyndon Hannibal (SL) and Prageeth Rambukwella (SL)
Player of the match: Wanindu Hasaranga (SL)

- Sri Lanka won the toss and elected to field.

== Statistics ==
=== Most runs (ODI) ===
Rank	Runs	Player	Innings	Average	High Score	100	50
1	129	(Sri Lanka) Kusal Mendis	3	64.50	66*	0	1
2	119	(Sri Lanka) Janith Liyanage	2	59.40	95	0	1
3	101	(Sri Lanka) Charith Asalanka	2	50.50	101	1	0
4	82	(Zimbabwe) Craig Ervine	3	27.33	82	0	1
5	59	(Zimbabwe) Joylord Gumbie	2	29.50	30	0	0
Last Updated: 19 January 2024

=== Most wickets (ODI) ===
Rank	Wickets	Player	Innings	Best	Average	Economy	5W
1	8	(Zimbabwe) Richard Ngarava	3	5/32	11.37	4.62	1
2	7	(Sri Lanka) Wanindu Hasaranga	1	7/19	2.71	5.00	1
3	5	(Sri Lanka) Maheesh Theekshana	2	4/31	9.20	17.60	0
4	4	(Sri Lanka) Dilshan Madushanka	3	2/0	13.75	3.92	0
5	3	(Zimbabwe) Sikandar Raza	3	2/32	28.33	3.69	0
Last Updated: 19 January 2024

=== Most runs (T20I) ===
Rank	Runs	Player	Innings	Average	High Score	Strike Rate	50
1	112	(Sri Lanka) Angelo Mathews	2	112.00	66*	125.84	1
2	85	(Sri Lanka) Charith Asalanka	2	42.50	69	139.34	1
3	80	(Zimbabwe) Craig Ervine	3	26.66	70	112.67	1
3	80	(Zimbabwe) Sikandar Raza	3	26.66	62	135.59	1
4	64	(Zimbabwe) Brian Bennett	3	32.00	29	160.00	0
5	54	(Sri Lanka) Kusal Mendis	3	18.00	33	114.89	0
Last Updated: 19 January 2024

=== Most wickets (T20I) ===
Rank	Wickets	Player	Innings	Best	Average	Economy	4W
1	7	(Sri Lanka) Wanindu Hasaranga	3	4/15	10.71	6.25	1
2	6	(Sri Lanka) Maheesh Theekshana	3	2/14	9.16	4.92	0
3	4	(Zimbabwe) Blessing Muzarabani	3	2/33	21.25	8.50	0
4	3	(Zimbabwe) Sikandar Raza	3	3/13	21.00	5.81	0
4	3	(Sri Lanka) Dushmantha Chameera	3	2/30	27.00	8.10	0
Last Updated: 19 January 2024
