= Zimbabwean cricket team in Scotland in 2021 =

International cricket tour

	Scotland	Zimbabwe
- Dates: 15 – 19 September 2021
Captains	Kyle Coetzer	Craig Ervine

Twenty20 International series
- Results: Zimbabwe won the 3-match series 2–1
Most runs	Richie Berrington (168)	Milton Shumba (112)
Most wickets	Safyaan Sharif (4)	Tendai Chatara (5); Luke Jongwe (5)
- Player of the series: Milton Shumba (Zim)

The Zimbabwe cricket team toured Scotland in September 2021 to play three Twenty20 International (T20I) matches. All of the matches took place at The Grange Club in Edinburgh. Scotland's last home international fixtures were in August 2019.

Scotland won the first T20I match by seven runs, with Zimbabwe winning the second match by ten runs to level the series. Zimbabwe won the third T20I by six wickets to win the series 2–1.

== Squads ==
T20Is
Scotland	Zimbabwe
Kyle Coetzer (c); Richie Berrington (vc); Dylan Budge; Matthew Cross (wk); Alasdair Evans; Chris Greaves; Ollie Hairs; Michael Leask; Gavin Main; Calum MacLeod; George Munsey; Adrian Neill; Safyaan Sharif; Chris Sole; Hamza Tahir; Craig Wallace (wk); Mark Watt	Craig Ervine (c); Ryan Burl; Regis Chakabva; Tendai Chatara; Luke Jongwe; Innocent Kaia; Tinashe Kamunhukamwe; Wesley Madhevere; Tadiwanashe Marumani; Wellington Masakadza; Tarisai Musakanda; Blessing Muzarabani; Dion Myers; Richard Ngarava; Sikandar Raza; Milton Shumba; ~~Brendan Taylor~~; Donald Tiripano; Sean Williams

Zimbabwe's Brendan Taylor retired from international cricket following the final match of Zimbabwe's tour of Ireland, which took place two days prior.

== T20I series ==
=== 1st T20I ===
15 September 2021
14:00
Scorecard

Scotland; 141/6 (20 overs)	v	Zimbabwe; 134/9 (20 overs)
Richie Berrington 82* (61); Tendai Chatara 2/23 (4 overs)		Milton Shumba 45* (30); Safyaan Sharif 4/24 (4 overs)

Scotland won by 7 runs
The Grange Club, Edinburgh
Umpires: Allan Haggo (Sco) and David McLean (Sco)
Player of the match: Richie Berrington (Sco)

- Scotland won the toss and elected to bat.

=== 2nd T20I ===
17 September 2021
14:00
Scorecard

Zimbabwe; 136/5 (20 overs)	v	Scotland; 126 (19.4 overs)
Sean Williams 60* (52); Gavin Main 1/17 (3 overs)		Matthew Cross 42 (35); Richard Ngarava 2/13 (4 overs)

Zimbabwe won by 10 runs
The Grange Club, Edinburgh
Umpires: Mark Hawthorne (Ire) and David McLean (Sco)
Player of the match: Richard Ngarava (Zim)

- Zimbabwe won the toss and elected to bat.
- Innocent Kaia (Zim) made his T20I debut.
- Richie Berrington (Sco) played in his 250th international match.

=== 3rd T20I ===
19 September 2021
14:00
Scorecard

Scotland; 177/4 (20 overs)	v	Zimbabwe; 180/4 (19.1 overs)
George Munsey 54 (30); Luke Jongwe 2/32 (3 overs)		Milton Shumba 66* (29); Michael Leask 2/22 (3 overs)

Zimbabwe won by 6 wickets
The Grange Club, Edinburgh
Umpires: Allan Haggo (Sco) and Mark Hawthorne (Ire)
Player of the match: Milton Shumba (Zim)

- Scotland won the toss and elected to bat.
