= Sri Lankan cricket team in Zimbabwe in 2025 =

International cricket tour

	Zimbabwe	Sri Lanka
- Dates: 29 August – 7 September 2025
Captains	Sean Williams (ODIs); Sikandar Raza (T20Is)	Charith Asalanka

One Day International series
- Results: Sri Lanka won the 2-match series 2–0
Most runs	Sikandar Raza (151)	Pathum Nissanka (198)
Most wickets	Richard Ngarava (4)	Asitha Fernando (5); Dilshan Madushanka (5)
- Player of the series: Pathum Nissanka (SL)

Twenty20 International series
- Results: Sri Lanka won the 3-match series 2–1
Most runs	Brian Bennett (113)	Pathum Nissanka (96)
Most wickets	Brad Evans (5); Sikandar Raza (5)	Dushmantha Chameera (8)
- Player of the series: Dushmantha Chameera (SL)

The Sri Lanka cricket team toured Zimbabwe in August and September 2025 to play the Zimbabwe cricket team. The tour consisted of two One Day International (ODI) and three Twenty20 Internationals (T20I) matches. All the matches were played at the Harare Sports Club. The T20I series formed part of Zimbabwe's preparation ahead of the 2025 Men's T20 World Cup Africa Regional Final tournament. In June 2025, the Zimbabwe Cricket (ZC) confirmed the fixtures for the tour as a part of the 2025 home international season.

== Squads ==
Zimbabwe		Sri Lanka	
ODIs	T20Is	ODIs	T20Is
Sean Williams (c); ~~Craig Ervine (c)~~; Brian Bennett; Johnathan Campbell; Ben Curran; Brad Evans; Trevor Gwandu; Wessly Madhevere; Clive Madande (wk); Ernest Masuku; Tony Munyonga; Blessing Muzarabani; Richard Ngarava; Newman Nyamhuri; Sikandar Raza; Brendan Taylor (wk)	Sikandar Raza (c); Brian Bennett; Ryan Burl; Brad Evans; Trevor Gwandu; Clive Madande (wk); Tinotenda Maposa; Tadiwanashe Marumani; Wellington Masakadza; Tony Munyonga; Tashinga Musekiwa; Blessing Muzarabani; Dion Myers; Richard Ngarava; Brendan Taylor (wk); Sean Williams	Charith Asalanka (c); Dushmantha Chameera; Asitha Fernando; Nuwanidu Fernando; Janith Liyanage; Dilshan Madushanka; Nishan Madushka (wk); Kamindu Mendis; Kusal Mendis (wk); Pathum Nissanka; Milan Rathnayake; Pavan Rathnayake; Sadeera Samarawickrama (wk); Maheesh Theekshana; Jeffrey Vandersay; Dunith Wellalage	Charith Asalanka (c); Dushmantha Chameera; Binura Fernando; Nuwanidu Fernando; Vishen Halambage; Dushan Hemantha; Chamika Karunaratne; Kamindu Mendis; Kusal Mendis (wk); Kamil Mishara; Pathum Nissanka; Matheesha Pathirana; Kusal Perera (wk); Dasun Shanaka; Maheesh Theekshana; Nuwan Thushara; Dunith Wellalage

On 29 August, Craig Ervine was ruled out of the ODI series due to a calf injury. Sean Williams was named the captain for the ODI series.

== ODI series ==
=== 1st ODI ===
29 August 2025
09:30
Scorecard

Sri Lanka; 298/6 (50 overs)	v	Zimbabwe; 291/8 (50 overs)
Pathum Nissanka 76 (92); Richard Ngarava 2/34 (7.4 overs)		Sikandar Raza 92 (87); Dilshan Madushanka 4/62 (10 overs)

Sri Lanka won by 7 runs
Harare Sports Club, Harare
Umpires: Richard Kettleborough (Eng) and Langton Rusere (Zim)
Player of the match: Dilshan Madushanka (SL)

- Zimbabwe won the toss and elected to field.
- Dilshan Madushanka (SL) took his first hat-trick in ODIs.

=== 2nd ODI ===
31 August 2025
09:30
Scorecard

Zimbabwe; 277/7 (50 overs)	v	Sri Lanka; 278/5 (49.3 overs)
Ben Curran 79 (95); Dushmantha Chameera 3/52 (10 overs)		Pathum Nissanka 122 (136); Richard Ngarava 2/53 (9 overs)

Sri Lanka won by 5 wickets
Harare Sports Club, Harare
Umpires: Iknow Chabi (Zim) and Richard Kettleborough (Eng)
Player of the match: Pathum Nissanka (SL)

- Sri Lanka won the toss and elected to field.
- Ernest Masuku (Zim) made his ODI debut.
- Brendan Taylor (Zim) scored his 10,000th run in international cricket.

== T20I series ==
=== 1st T20I ===
3 September 2025
13:30
Scorecard

Zimbabwe; 175/7 (20 overs)	v	Sri Lanka; 177/6 (19.1 overs)
Brian Bennett 81 (57); Dushmantha Chameera 3/30 (4 overs)		Pathum Nissanka 55 (32); Richard Ngarava 2/19 (4 overs)

Sri Lanka won by 4 wickets
Harare Sports Club, Harare
Umpires: Forster Mutizwa (Zim) and Percival Sizara (Zim)
Player of the match: Kamindu Mendis (SL)

- Sri Lanka won the toss and elected to field.
- Dushan Hemantha (SL) made his T20I debut.

=== 2nd T20I ===
6 September 2025
13:30
Scorecard

Sri Lanka; 80 (17.4 overs)	v	Zimbabwe; 84/5 (14.2 overs)
Kamil Mishara 20 (20); Brad Evans 3/15 (2.4 overs)		Tashinga Musekiwa 21* (14); Dushmantha Chameera 3/19 (4 overs)

Zimbabwe won by 5 wickets
Harare Sports Club, Harare
Umpires: Iknow Chabi (Zim) and Langton Rusere (Zim)
Player of the match: Sikandar Raza (Zim)

- Zimbabwe won the toss and elected to field.

=== 3rd T20I ===
7 September 2025
13:30
Scorecard

Zimbabwe; 191/8 (20 overs)	v	Sri Lanka; 193/2 (17.4 overs)
Tadiwanashe Marumani 51 (44); Dushan Hemantha 3/38 (4 overs)		Kamil Mishara 73* (43); Brad Evans 1/28 (3 overs)

Sri Lanka won by 8 wickets
Harare Sports Club, Harare
Umpires: Iknow Chabi (Zim) and Forster Mutizwa (Zim)
Player of the match: Kamil Mishara (SL)

- Sri Lanka won the toss and elected to field.
