= Pakistani cricket team in Zimbabwe in 2020–21 =

International cricket tour

	Zimbabwe	Pakistan
- Dates: 21 April – 11 May 2021
Captains	Brendan Taylor (Tests); Sean Williams (T20Is) (Note: Brendan Taylor captained Zimbabwe for the second T20I.)	Babar Azam

Test series
- Result: Pakistan won the 2-match series 2–0
Most runs	Regis Chakabva (146)	Abid Ali (275)
Most wickets	Blessing Muzarabani (7)	Hasan Ali (14)
- Player of the series: Hasan Ali (Pak)

Twenty20 International series
- Results: Pakistan won the 3-match series 2–1
Most runs	Wesley Madhevere (89)	Mohammad Rizwan (186)
Most wickets	Luke Jongwe (9)	Mohammad Hasnain (5)
- Player of the series: Mohammad Rizwan (Pak)

The Pakistan cricket team toured Zimbabwe in April and May 2021 to play two Tests and three Twenty20 International (T20I) matches. The tour of Zimbabwe followed on from Pakistan's tour of South Africa. On 28 March 2021, the Pakistan Cricket Board (PCB) confirmed the tour itinerary, with all the matches being played behind closed doors in Harare.

Pakistan won the first T20I match by eleven runs, with Zimbabwe winning the second match by nineteen runs to level the series. It was Zimbabwe's first win against Pakistan in T20Is in sixteen attempts, and their first win in a home T20I match since beating India in June 2016. Pakistan won the third T20I match by 24 runs to win the series 2–1.

Pakistan won the first Test match inside three days, beating Zimbabwe by an innings and 116 runs. Pakistan won the second match by an innings and 147 runs to win the series 2–0.

== Squads ==
Tests		T20Is	
Zimbabwe	Pakistan	Zimbabwe	Pakistan
Brendan Taylor (c); ~~Sean Williams (c)~~; Regis Chakabva; Tendai Chisoro; Tanaka Chivanga; Luke Jongwe; Roy Kaia; Kevin Kasuza; Wesley Madhevere; Wellington Masakadza; Prince Masvaure; Tarisai Musakanda; Blessing Muzarabani; Richard Ngarava; Victor Nyauchi; Milton Shumba; Donald Tiripano	Babar Azam (c); Mohammad Rizwan (vc, wk); Shaheen Afridi; Sarfaraz Ahmed (wk); Fawad Alam; Abid Ali; Azhar Ali; Hasan Ali; Nauman Ali; Faheem Ashraf; Imran Butt; Shahnawaz Dahani; Sajid Khan; Tabish Khan; Zahid Mahmood; Mohammad Nawaz; Haris Rauf; Agha Salman; Abdullah Shafique; Saud Shakeel	Sean Williams (c); Ryan Burl; Regis Chakabva; Tanaka Chivanga; Craig Ervine; Luke Jongwe; Tinashe Kamunhukamwe; Wesley Madhevere; Tadiwanashe Marumani; Wellington Masakadza; Tapiwa Mufudza; Tarisai Musakanda; Blessing Muzarabani; Richard Ngarava; Brendan Taylor; Donald Tiripano	Babar Azam (c); ~~Shadab Khan (vc)~~; Shaheen Afridi; Sarfaraz Ahmed (wk); Asif Ali; Haider Ali; Hasan Ali; Faheem Ashraf; Danish Aziz; Mohammad Hafeez; Mohammad Hasnain; Arshad Iqbal; Sharjeel Khan; ~~Zahid Mahmood~~; Mohammad Nawaz; Usman Qadir; Haris Rauf; Mohammad Rizwan (wk); Mohammad Wasim; Fakhar Zaman

Pakistan's Shadab Khan injured his toe during the second One Day International (ODI) against South Africa and was ruled out of T20I matches against Zimbabwe. Zahid Mahmood was named as Shadab Khan's replacement for the T20I matches. However, Zahid Mahmood would later rule himself out of the T20I matches, due to the anxiety of flying alone. Fakhar Zaman was also added to Pakistan's T20I squad.

Sean Williams was named as Zimbabwe's captain for the T20I matches, after their regular captain Chamu Chibhabha was still recovering from a thigh injury. Tarisai Musakanda, Ainsley Ndlovu and Brad Evans were also named as standby players for Zimbabwe's T20I matches. Craig Ervine was ruled out of Zimbabwe's squad for the last two T20Is, after suffering an injury in the first match. Tarisai Musakanda was named as Ervine's replacement. Joylord Gumbie and Takudzwanashe Kaitano were both named as standby players for Zimbabwe's Test matches. Ultimately, Sean Williams only captained Zimbabwe for the first and third T20Is, after suffering an injury, with Brendan Taylor leading the team in the second T20I and the Test series. Wesley Madhevere was added to Zimbabwe's squad for the second Test.

== T20I series ==
=== 1st T20I ===
21 April 2021
11:00
Scorecard

Pakistan; 149/7 (20 overs)	v	Zimbabwe; 138/7 (20 overs)
Mohammad Rizwan 82* (61); Wesley Madhevere 2/11 (2 overs)		Craig Ervine 34 (23); Usman Qadir 3/29 (4 overs)

Pakistan won by 11 runs
Harare Sports Club, Harare
Umpires: Iknow Chabi (Zim) and Langton Rusere (Zim)
Player of the match: Mohammad Rizwan (Pak)

- Zimbabwe won the toss and elected to field.
- Tadiwanashe Marumani (Zim) and Danish Aziz (Pak) both made their T20I debuts.

=== 2nd T20I ===
23 April 2021
11:00
Scorecard

Zimbabwe; 118/9 (20 overs)	v	Pakistan; 99 (19.5 overs)
Tinashe Kamunhukamwe 34 (40); Mohammad Hasnain 2/19 (4 overs)		Babar Azam 41 (45); Luke Jongwe 4/18 (3.5 overs)

Zimbabwe won by 19 runs
Harare Sports Club, Harare
Umpires: Iknow Chabi (Zim) and Langton Rusere (Zim)
Player of the match: Luke Jongwe (Zim)

- Pakistan won the toss and elected to field.
- Arshad Iqbal (Pak) made his T20I debut.
- This was Zimbabwe's first win against Pakistan in T20Is.

=== 3rd T20I ===
25 April 2021
11:00
Scorecard

Pakistan; 165/3 (20 overs)	v	Zimbabwe; 141/7 (20 overs)
Mohammad Rizwan 91* (60); Luke Jongwe 3/37 (4 overs)		Wesley Madhevere 59 (47); Hasan Ali 4/18 (4 overs)

Pakistan won by 24 runs
Harare Sports Club, Harare
Umpires: Iknow Chabi (Zim) and Langton Rusere (Zim)
Player of the match: Hasan Ali (Pak)

- Pakistan won the toss and elected to bat.
- Babar Azam (Pak) became the fastest batsman, in terms of innings, to score 2,000 runs in T20Is (52).

== Test series ==
=== 1st Test ===
29 April–3 May 2021 (Note: While five days of play were scheduled for each Test, the first Test reached a result in three days, and the second Test reached a result in four days.)
Scorecard

Zimbabwe	v	Pakistan
176 (59.1 overs); Roy Kaia 48 (94); Shaheen Afridi 4/43 (15.1 overs)		426 (133 overs); Fawad Alam 140 (204); Blessing Muzarabani 4/73 (31 overs)
134 (46.2 overs); Tarisai Musakanda 43 (84); Hasan Ali 5/36 (12.2 overs)

Pakistan won by an innings and 116 runs
Harare Sports Club, Harare
Umpires: Marais Erasmus (SA) and Langton Rusere (Zim)
Player of the match: Hasan Ali (Pak)

- Zimbabwe won the toss and elected to bat.
- Roy Kaia, Richard Ngarava, Milton Shumba (Zim) and Sajid Khan (Pak) all made their Test debuts.
- Langton Rusere (Zim) became the first black African umpire to stand in a Test.
- Shaheen Afridi (Pak) took his 50th wicket in Tests.
- Hasan Ali (Pak) took his 50th wicket in Tests.

=== 2nd Test ===
7–11 May 2021
Scorecard

Pakistan	v	Zimbabwe
510/8d (147.1 overs); Abid Ali 215* (407); Blessing Muzarabani 3/82 (29 overs)		132 (60.4 overs); Regis Chakabva 33 (92); Hasan Ali 5/27 (13 overs)
		231 (68 overs) (f/o); Regis Chakabva 80 (137); Shaheen Afridi 5/52 (20 overs)

Pakistan won by an innings and 147 runs
Harare Sports Club, Harare
Umpires: Marais Erasmus (SA) and Langton Rusere (Zim)
Player of the match: Abid Ali (Pak)

- Pakistan won the toss and elected to bat.
- Luke Jongwe (Zim) and Tabish Khan (Pak) both made their Test debuts.
- Abid Ali (Pak) scored his first double century in Tests.
- Hasan Ali, Nauman Ali and Shaheen Afridi each took a five-wicket haul, the first time that three bowlers for Pakistan had done so in the same Test.
