= Bangladeshi cricket team in Zimbabwe in 2022 =

International cricket tour

	Zimbabwe	Bangladesh
- Dates: 30 July – 10 August 2022
Captains	Regis Chakabva (ODIs) (Note: Sikandar Raza captained Zimbabwe for the third ODI.); Craig Ervine (T20Is)	Tamim Iqbal (ODIs); Nurul Hasan (T20Is) (Note: Mosaddek Hossain captained Bangladesh for the third T20I.)

One Day International series
- Results: Zimbabwe won the 3-match series 2–1
Most runs	Sikandar Raza (252)	Anamul Haque (169)
Most wickets	Sikandar Raza (5)	Mustafizur Rahman (5)
- Player of the series: Sikandar Raza (Zim)

Twenty20 International series
- Results: Zimbabwe won the 3-match series 2–1
Most runs	Sikandar Raza (127)	Litton Das (101)
Most wickets	Victor Nyauchi (3); Luke Jongwe (3)	Mosaddek Hossain (7)
- Player of the series: Sikandar Raza (Zim)

The Bangladesh cricket team toured Zimbabwe in July and August 2022 to play three One Day International (ODI) and three Twenty20 International (T20I) matches. The original tour schedule was for two Test matches and three ODIs, but the Test matches were replaced by the T20I fixtures. All the matches took place at the Harare Sports Club. Prior to the series, the Bangladesh Cricket Board (BCB) named Nurul Hasan as their T20I captain for the tour, after Mahmudullah lacked performance and results. However, Nurul suffered a finger injury during the second T20I match and was ruled out of the rest of the tour. The BCB named Mosaddek Hossain as the team's captain for the third T20I match.

Zimbabwe won the opening T20I match by 17 runs. It was the team's sixth-consecutive win in T20Is, their best in the format. Bangladesh won the second T20I by seven wickets to level the series. Mosaddek Hossain took five wickets for 20 runs, the joint second-best bowling figures for Bangladesh in a T20I match. Zimbabwe won the third T20I by 10 runs to win the series by 2–1 margin, which was their first T20I series win against Bangladesh.

In the first ODI, Bangladesh scored 303 losing 2 wickets with their top four batters scoring fifties. In reply, Zimbabwe chased down the total with 10 balls to spare with the help of centuries from Innocent Kaia (110) and Sikandar Raza (135*). This was their joint-third highest successful run chase in ODIs. It was their first win against Bangladesh since 8 May 2013 ending their 19 successive defeats streak against Bangladesh. The 192-run stand between Innocent Kaia and Sikandar Raza for the fourth wicket was their highest partnership for any wicket against Bangladesh as well as their fourth highest partnership for any wicket. In the second ODI, Batting first, Bangladesh managed 290 runs in 50 overs. In reply, Zimbabwe lost four wickets in quick succession. But, the 201-run stand between Sikandar Raza and Regis Chakabva helped their side to win the match by 5 wickets, and Zimbabwe took an unassailable lead of 2–0 in the series. In the process, Raza scored back-to-back centuries in this ODI series and Chakabva scored his maiden ODI century off 73 balls, the fastest century by a Zimbabwean batter. In the third ODI, Bangladesh could only manage 256 with the help of two half-centuries from Anamul Haque and Afif Hossain. In reply, Zimbabwe kept losing wickets at regular intervals and they were reduced to 83/9. But the 68-run stand between Richard Ngarava and Victor Nyauchi helped them to reduce the defeat margin before they were bowled out on 151 and Bangladesh won the match comprehensively by 105 runs. Eventually, Zimbabwe won the ODI series by a 2–1 margin.

== Squads ==
ODIs		T20Is	
Zimbabwe	Bangladesh	Zimbabwe	Bangladesh
Regis Chakabva (c); Ryan Burl; Tanaka Chivanga; Brad Evans; Luke Jongwe; Innocent Kaia; Takudzwanashe Kaitano; Clive Madande; Wesley Madhevere; Tadiwanashe Marumani; Wellington Masakadza; Tony Munyonga; Tarisai Musakanda; Richard Ngarava; Victor Nyauchi; Sikandar Raza; Milton Shumba	Tamim Iqbal (c); Nasum Ahmed; Taskin Ahmed; Litton Das; Anamul Haque; Mehidy Hasan; ~~Nurul Hasan~~; Afif Hossain; Ebadot Hossain; Mosaddek Hossain; Shoriful Islam; Taijul Islam; Hasan Mahmud; Mahmudullah; Mohammad Naim; Mushfiqur Rahim; Mustafizur Rahman; Najmul Hossain Shanto	Craig Ervine (c); Ryan Burl; Regis Chakabva; Tanaka Chivanga; Brad Evans; Luke Jongwe; Innocent Kaia; Wesley Madhevere; Tadiwanashe Marumani; Wellington Masakadza; John Masara; Tony Munyonga; Richard Ngarava; Victor Nyauchi; Sikandar Raza; Milton Shumba; Sean Williams	Nurul Hasan (c); Nasum Ahmed; Taskin Ahmed; Litton Das; Parvez Hossain Emon; Anamul Haque; Mahedi Hasan; Mehidy Hasan; Afif Hossain; Mosaddek Hossain; Shoriful Islam; Hasan Mahmud; Mahmudullah; Mustafizur Rahman; Munim Shahriar; Najmul Hossain Shanto

Bangladesh's Nurul Hasan suffered a finger injury during the second T20I match and was ruled out of the rest of the tour. Mosaddek Hossain was named as the T20I captain for the third match, with Mahmudullah added to Bangladesh's T20I squad in place of Nurul Hasan. Before the first ODI, Craig Ervine was ruled out of the series due to hamstring and knee injury and Regis Chakabva was named as the captain for the ODI series. Sean Williams was also granted leave from the ODI series for personal reasons. Brad Evans was added to the Zimbabwe's squad in place of the injured Tendai Chatara. Litton Das and Shoriful Islam suffered injuries during the first ODI and were replaced by Mohammad Naim and Ebadot Hossain respectively.

== T20I series ==
=== 1st T20I ===
30 July 2022
13:00
Scorecard

Zimbabwe; 205/3 (20 overs)	v	Bangladesh; 188/6 (20 overs)
Wesley Madhevere 67* (46); Mustafizur Rahman 2/50 (4 overs)		Nurul Hasan 42* (26); Luke Jongwe 2/34 (4 overs)

Zimbabwe won by 17 runs
Harare Sports Club, Harare
Umpires: Iknow Chabi (Zim) and Langton Rusere (Zim) (Note: Forster Mutizwa (Zim) replaced Langton Rusere as the on-field umpire since the start of the 8th over of the first innings.)
Player of the match: Sikandar Raza (Zim)

- Zimbabwe won the toss and elected to bat.
- Nurul Hasan captained Bangladesh for the first time in T20Is.
- Litton Das (Ban) scored his 1,000th run in T20Is.

=== 2nd T20I ===
31 July 2022
13:00
Scorecard

Zimbabwe; 135/8 (20 overs)	v	Bangladesh; 136/3 (17.3 overs)
Sikandar Raza 62 (53); Mosaddek Hossain 5/20 (4 overs)		Litton Das 56 (33); Sean Williams 1/13 (2 overs)

Bangladesh won by 7 wickets
Harare Sports Club, Harare
Umpires: Iknow Chabi (Zim) and Forster Mutizwa (Zim)
Player of the match: Mosaddek Hossain (Ban)

- Zimbabwe won the toss and elected to bat.
- Mosaddek Hossain (Ban) took his first five-wicket hauls in T20Is.

=== 3rd T20I ===
2 August 2022
13:00
Scorecard

Zimbabwe; 156/8 (20 overs)	v	Bangladesh; 146/8 (20 overs)
Ryan Burl 54 (28); Mahedi Hasan 2/28 (4 overs); Hasan Mahmud 2/28 (4 overs)		Afif Hossain 39* (27); Victor Nyauchi 3/29 (4 overs)

Zimbabwe won by 10 runs
Harare Sports Club, Harare
Umpires: Christopher Phiri (Zim) and Langton Rusere (Zim)
Player of the match: Ryan Burl (Zim)

- Zimbabwe won the toss and elected to bat.
- John Masara (Zim) and Parvez Hossain Emon (Ban) both made their T20I debuts.

== ODI series ==
=== 1st ODI ===
5 August 2022
09:15
Scorecard

Bangladesh; 303/2 (50 overs)	v	Zimbabwe; 307/5 (48.2 overs)
Litton Das 81* (89); Sikandar Raza 1/48 (9 overs)		Sikandar Raza 135* (109); Shoriful Islam 1/57 (8.4 overs)

Zimbabwe won by 5 wickets
Harare Sports Club, Harare
Umpires: Iknow Chabi (Zim) and Langton Rusere (Zim)
Player of the match: Sikandar Raza (Zim)

- Zimbabwe won the toss and elected to field.
- Victor Nyauchi (Zim) made his ODI debut.
- Tamim Iqbal became the first batter for Bangladesh to score 8,000 runs in ODIs.
- Innocent Kaia (Zim) scored his first century in ODIs.

=== 2nd ODI ===
7 August 2022
09:15
Scorecard

Bangladesh; 290/9 (50 overs)	v	Zimbabwe; 291/5 (47.3 overs)
Mahmudullah 80* (84); Sikandar Raza 3/56 (10 overs)		Sikandar Raza 117* (127); Hasan Mahmud 2/47 (9 overs)

Zimbabwe won by 5 wickets
Harare Sports Club, Harare
Umpires: Forster Mutizwa (Zim) and Langton Rusere (Zim)
Player of the match: Sikandar Raza (Zim)

- Zimbabwe won the toss and elected to field.
- Brad Evans and Tony Munyonga (Zim) both made their ODI debuts.
- Regis Chakabva (Zim) scored his first century in ODIs and it was the fastest century by a Zimbabwean batter in ODIs (73 balls).
- The 201-run stand between Sikandar Raza and Regis Chakabva is the highest fifth-wicket partnership for Zimbabwe in ODIs.

=== 3rd ODI ===
10 August 2022
09:15
Scorecard

Bangladesh; 256/9 (50 overs)	v	Zimbabwe; 151 (32.2 overs)
Afif Hossain 85* (81); Luke Jongwe 2/38 (6 overs)		Richard Ngarava 34* (26); Mustafizur Rahman 4/17 (5.2 overs)

Bangladesh won by 105 runs
Harare Sports Club, Harare
Umpires: Christopher Phiri (Zim) and Langton Rusere (Zim)
Player of the match: Afif Hossain (Ban)

- Zimbabwe won the toss and elected to field.
- Clive Madande (Zim) and Ebadot Hossain (Ban) both made their ODI debuts.
- The 68-run stand between Richard Ngarava and Victor Nyauchi is the highest tenth-wicket partnership for Zimbabwe in ODIs.
