= Joylord Gumbie =

Zimbabwean cricketer (born 1995)

Personal information
- Born: 25 December 1995 (age 30); Harare, Zimbabwe
- Height: 5 ft 3 in (1.60 m)
- Batting: Right-handed
- Role: Wicket-keeper

International information
- National side: Zimbabwe (2023–present)
- Test debut (cap 128): 25 July 2024 v Ireland
- Last Test: 2 January 2025 v Afghanistan
- ODI debut (cap 154): 18 June 2023 v Nepal
- Last ODI: 21 December 2024 v Afghanistan
- T20I debut (cap 77): 3 May 2024 v Bangladesh
- Last T20I: 7 May 2024 v Bangladesh

Domestic team information
- Years: Team
- 2013–present: Mashonaland Eagles
- 2019–present: Mountaineers
- 2023–present: Northerns

Career statistics
Competition	Test	ODI	T20I	FC
Matches	3	16	3	69
Runs scored	129	382	43	2834
Batting average	21.50	23.87	14.33	24.85
100s/50s	0/0	0/2	0/0	4/13
Top score	49	78	17	168*
Catches/stumpings	6/0	10/0	0/0	134/8
- Source: ESPNcricinfo, 12 April 2025

Joylord Gumbie (born 25 December 1995) is a Zimbabwean international cricketer. He was part of Zimbabwe's squad for the 2014 ICC Under-19 Cricket World Cup. In December 2020, he was selected to play for the Mountaineers in the 2020–21 Logan Cup. In April 2021, he was named as a standby player for Zimbabwe's Test matches against Pakistan. In July 2021, Gumbie was named in Zimbabwe's Test squad for their one-off match against Bangladesh.

== International career ==
In June 2023, he was selected in One Day International (ODI) squad for the 2023 Cricket World Cup Qualifier. He made his ODI debut for Zimbabwe against Nepal in the first match of the tournament, on 18 June 2023. He also played in the first test match against Ireland in July 2024, played in Belfast.
