= Victor Nyauchi =

Zimbabwean cricketer (born 1992)

Personal information
- Full name: Victor Munyaradzi Nyauchi
- Born: 8 July 1992 (age 34); Harare, Zimbabwe
- Batting: Right-handed
- Bowling: Right-arm fast-medium
- Role: Bowler

International information
- National side: Zimbabwe (2020–present)
- Test debut (cap 111): 19 January 2020 v Sri Lanka
- Last Test: 20 April 2025 v Bangladesh
- ODI debut (cap 149): 5 August 2022 v Bangladesh
- Last ODI: 21 January 2023 v Ireland
- ODI shirt no.: 61
- T20I debut (cap 69): 22 May 2022 v Namibia
- Last T20I: 2 August 2022 v Bangladesh
- T20I shirt no.: 61

Career statistics
Competition	Test	ODI	T20I	FC
Matches	10	10	2	79
Runs scored	64	43	1	868
Batting average	6.40	7.16	–	10.45
100s/50s	0/0	0/0	0/0	0/1
Top score	13	26	1*	71
Balls bowled	1,580	402	42	12,094
Wickets	23	7	3	262
Bowling average	37.26	50.42	22.00	23.76
5 wickets in innings	1	0	0	8
10 wickets in match	0	–	–	1
Best bowling	5/56	2/65	3/29	6/27
Catches/stumpings	4/–	2/–	2/–	33/–
- Source: Cricinfo, 25 April 2025

Victor Nyauchi (born 8 July 1992) is a Zimbabwean cricketer. He was the leading wicket-taker in the 2017–18 Logan Cup for Mountaineers, with 31 dismissals in eight matches.

In January 2020, he was named in Zimbabwe's Test squad for their series against Sri Lanka. He made his Test debut for Zimbabwe, against Sri Lanka, on 19 January 2020. In December 2020, he was selected to play for the Mountaineers in the 2020–21 Logan Cup.

In May 2022, Nyauchi was named in Zimbabwe's Twenty20 International (T20I) squad for their five-match home series against Namibia. Nyauchi made his T20I debut on 22 May 2022, for Zimbabwe against Namibia. In August 2022, he was named in Zimbabwe's ODI squad, for their series against Bangladesh. He made his ODI debut on 5 August 2022, for Zimbabwe against Bangladesh.
