= Brad Evans (cricketer) =

Zimbabwean cricketer (born 1997)

Personal information
- Full name: Bradley Neil Evans
- Born: 24 March 1997 (age 29); Harare, Zimbabwe
- Batting: Right-handed
- Bowling: Right arm fast
- Role: Bowling all-rounder
- Relatives: Craig Evans (father)

International information
- National side: Zimbabwe
- Test debut (cap 122): 4 February 2023 v West Indies
- Last Test: 28 June 2026 v Bangladesh
- ODI debut (cap 150): 7 August 2022 v Bangladesh
- Last ODI: 11 July 2026 v Bangladesh
- T20I debut (cap 68): 21 May 2022 v Namibia
- Last T20I: 1 March 2026 v South Africa

Career statistics
Competition	Test	ODI	T20I	FC
Matches	3	20	31	28
Runs scored	46	240	140	754
Batting average	15.33	17.14	10.76	23.56
100s/50s	0/0	0/2	0/0	0/4
Top score	35*	58*	43	81
Balls bowled	435	800	622	3,725
Wickets	10	20	46	76
Bowling average	25.00	37.50	18.00	24.71
5 wickets in innings	1	1	0	2
10 wickets in match	0	0	0	0
Best bowling	5/22	5/54	4/16	5/22
Catches/stumpings	3/–	10/–	10/–	23/–
- Source: Cricinfo, 13 July 2026

Brad Evans (born 24 March 1997) is a Zimbabwean cricketer.

== Early life and career ==
Evans is the son of former Zimbabwean Test cricketer Craig Evans. He started his own cricket career as an opening batter, but transitioned to a fast bowler as a teenager.

Evans attended St. John's College in Harare, but left the school one year before graduating to accept a sports scholarship at Cardiff Metropolitan University. He made his first-class cricket debut on 1 April 2018 for Cardiff South Wales MCC University, a team that represents several universities in Wales, as part of the 2018 Marylebone Cricket Club University Matches, and was able to play cricket for Sussex County Cricket Club's second team while still in school. After graduating, his visa changed and he was no longer eligible to do so. Rather than wait until he could obtain a British passport to advance his cricket career in the United Kingdom, he decided to return to Zimbabwe and play cricket there.

Croes began playing top-level domestic cricket in Zimbabwe for the Eagles in the 2020–21 season, playing for the Eagles in the first-class Logan Cup and making his List A and Twenty20 debuts in the Pro50 Championship and Domestic Twenty20 Competition respectively.

== International career ==
Evans was named as a standby player in Zimbabwe's squad for their Twenty20 International series against Pakistan, but he did not play in the series. He made his international debut for Zimbabwe in their five-match home series against Namibia in May 2022, playing in the third match of the series, which Zimbabwe lost. Evans later described this series loss as "rock bottom" for Zimbabwe.

In the following months, Evans was part of a revival for Zimbabwe's cricket fortunes, playing in their series win against Bangladesh and following series against India in August, and then in their away series against Australia in September. His One Day International debut came against Bangladesh on 7 August, then just two weeks later on 22 August, he took his maiden five-wicket haul with bowling figures of 5/54 against India. He also contributed with the bat as part of a 104-run partnership with Sikandar Raza during Zimbabwe's chase, with Zimbabwe falling just 13 runs short of an upset win. On 3 September, he hit the winning runs in their final match against Australia to give Zimbabwe their first ever ODI win in the country. Needing one run for the victory, Evans drove Australian bowler Mitchell Starc to the boundary, but because he had run a single before the ball reached the boundary, he was only awarded a single run by the scorers.

In October 2022, Evans was part of Zimbabwe's squad for the 2022 Men's T20 World Cup in Australia, where he played an important role in Zimbabwe's dramatic upset win over Pakistan. Evans bowled the final over of the match with Pakistan needing 10 runs to win. He restricted the Pakistan batters to 8 runs and took a wicket to give Zimbabwe the win by a single run.

On 4 February 2023, Evans made his Test debut against the West Indies. Later that year he suffered from a leg injury which ruled him out of the African qualifiers for the 2024 Men's T20 World Cup, where Zimbabwe failed to qualify for the World Cup. He returned to Zimbabwe's Test team for his second Test match against Afghanistan in October 2025, and took a five-wicket haul in Zimbabwe's win. His bowling figures of 5/22 broke Zimbabwe's team record for the least runs conceded in a five-wicket haul. In November 2025 he was part of Zimbabwe's largest-ever Twenty20 win against Sri Lanka, taking bowling figures of 3/9 in the 67-run victory.

During the 2nd ODI against Bangladesh, Evans hit his maiden ODI and international half century, smashing 58 runs off 38 balls.
