= Milton Shumba =

Zimbabwean cricketer (born 2000)

Personal information
- Born: 19 October 2000 (age 26); Chitungwiza, Zimbabwe
- Batting: Left-handed
- Bowling: Slow left-arm orthodox
- Role: Top-order batsman

International information
- National side: Zimbabwe (2021–2024)
- Test debut (cap 117): 29 April 2021 v Pakistan
- Last Test: 12 February 2023 v West Indies
- ODI debut (cap 145): 10 September 2021 v Ireland
- Last ODI: 11 January 2024 v Sri Lanka
- ODI shirt no.: 3
- T20I debut (cap 63): 10 November 2020 v Pakistan
- Last T20I: 2 November 2022 v Netherlands
- T20I shirt no.: 3

Domestic team information
- Years: Team
- 2016: Eastern Province
- 2017–2018: Rising Stars

Career statistics
| Competition | Test | ODI | T20I | FC |
|---|---|---|---|---|
| Matches | 4 | 10 | 30 | 30 |
| Runs scored | 111 | 57 | 385 | 1565 |
| Batting average | 13.87 | 8.14 | 32.28 | 34.77 |
| 100s/50s | 0/0 | 0/0 | 0/1 | 3/6 |
| Top score | 41 | 26 | 66* | 121* |
| Balls bowled | 370 | 41 | 72 | 1419 |
| Wickets | 1 | 0 | 4 | 16 |
| Bowling average | 250.00 | – | 25.75 | 55.68 |
| 5 wickets in innings | 0 | 0 | 0 | 0 |
| 10 wickets in match | 0 | 0 | 0 | 0 |
| Best bowling | 1/64 | – | 3/16 | 4/48 |
| Catches/stumpings | 1/– | 3/– | 18/– | 12/– |
- Source: Cricinfo, 12 April 2025

Milton Shumba (born 19 October 2000) is a Zimbabwean cricketer. He made his Twenty20 debut for Zimbabwe against Eastern Province in the 2016 Africa T20 Cup on 30 September 2016. Prior to his T20 debut, he was part of Zimbabwe's squad for the 2016 Under-19 Cricket World Cup.

He made his first-class debut for Rising Stars in the 2017–18 Logan Cup on 12 November 2017. Later the same month, he was named in Zimbabwe's squad for the 2018 Under-19 Cricket World Cup. In December 2019, he was named in Zimbabwe's squad for the 2020 Under-19 Cricket World Cup. He made his List A debut on 12 February 2020, for Matabeleland Tuskers in the 2019–20 Pro50 Championship.

In October 2020, he was named in Zimbabwe's squad for their tour of Pakistan. He made his Twenty20 International (T20I) debut against Pakistan, on 10 November 2020. In December 2020, he was selected to play for the Tuskers in the 2020–21 Logan Cup. In April 2021, he was named in Zimbabwe's Test squad, for the series against Pakistan. He made his Test debut for Zimbabwe, against Pakistan, on 29 April 2021. In July 2021, Shumba was named in Zimbabwe's One Day International (ODI) squad for their series against Bangladesh. In August 2021, Shumba was also named in Zimbabwe's ODI squad for their series against Ireland. He made his ODI debut on 10 September 2021, for Zimbabwe against Ireland.
