= Clive Madande =

Zimbabwean cricketer (born 2000)

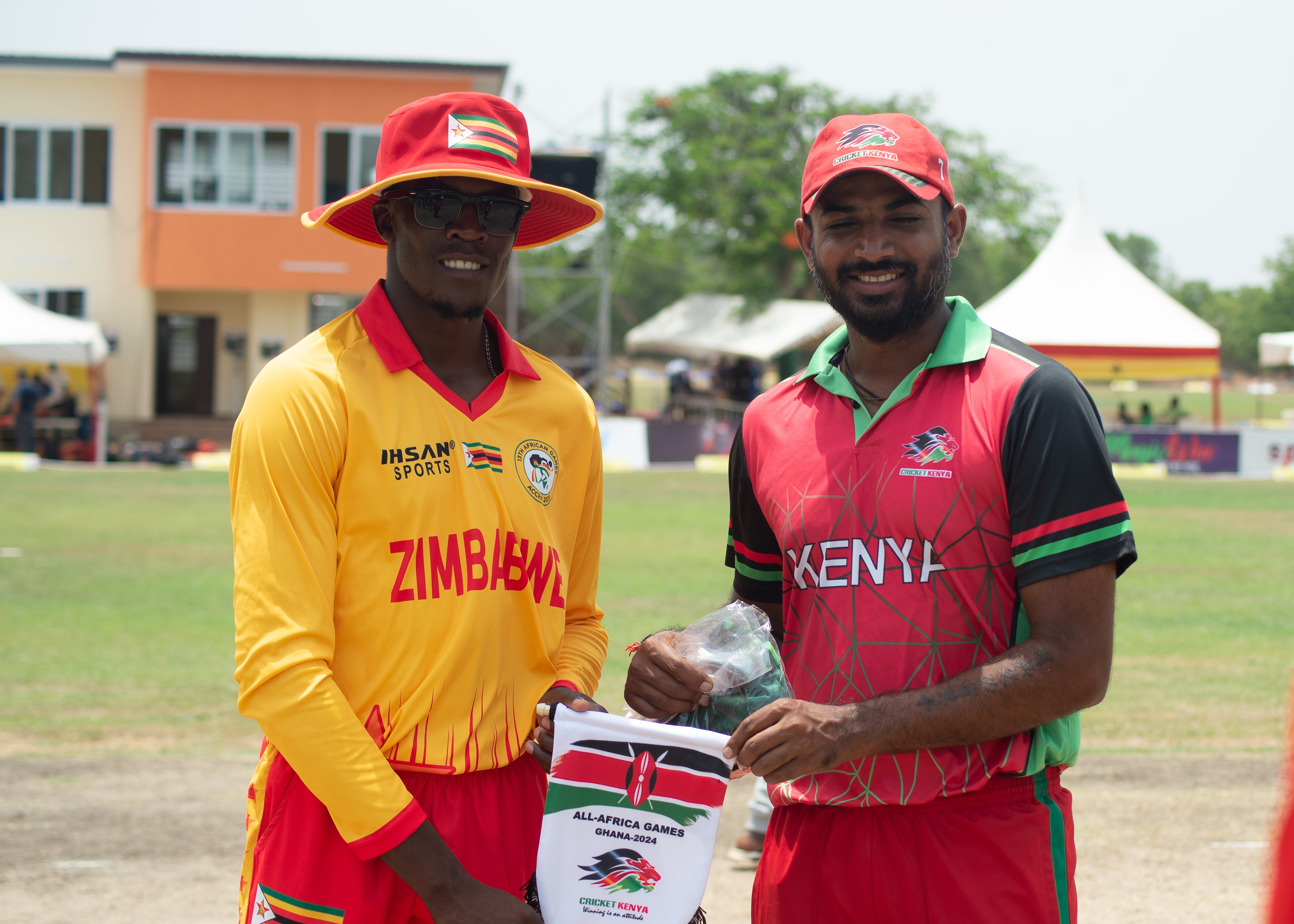
- Clive Madande and Rakep Patel (R), 2023 African Games

Personal information
- Born: 12 April 2000 (age 26); Harare, Zimbabwe
- Batting: Right-handed
- Role: Wicket-keeper

International information
- National side: Zimbabwe (2022–present)
- Only Test (cap 129): 25 July 2024 v Ireland
- ODI debut (cap 152): 10 August 2022 v Bangladesh
- Last ODI: 31 August 2025 v Sri Lanka
- ODI shirt no.: 42
- T20I debut (cap 70): 14 June 2022 v Afghanistan
- Last T20I: 2 November 2025 v Afghanistan

Career statistics
Competition	Test	ODI	T20I	FC
Matches	1	17	40	23
Runs scored	10	287	467	1,266
Batting average	5.00	23.91	17.29	34.21
100s/50s	0/0	0/2	0/1	2/8
Top score	10	74	53*	121*
Catches/stumpings	3/0	9/1	20/1	44/4
- Source: Cricinfo, 2 January 2026

Clive Madande (born 12 April 2000) is a Zimbabwean cricketer. He made his international debut for the Zimbabwe cricket team in June 2022.

== Career ==
He made his first-class debut on 30 March 2021, for Tuskers, in the 2020–21 Logan Cup. He made his Twenty20 debut on 11 April 2021, for Tuskers, in the 2020–21 Zimbabwe Domestic Twenty20 Competition. He made his List A debut on 18 April 2021, for Tuskers, in the 2020–21 Pro50 Championship.

In January 2022, Madande was named in Zimbabwe's One Day International (ODI) squad for their series against Sri Lanka. In June 2022, he was named in Zimbabwe's ODI and Twenty20 International (T20I) squads for their series against Afghanistan. He made his T20I debut on 14 June 2022, for Zimbabwe against Afghanistan. In August 2022, he was named in Zimbabwe's ODI squad, for their series against Bangladesh. He made his ODI debut on 10 August 2022, for Zimbabwe against Bangladesh.
