= Innocent Kaia =

Zimbabwean cricketer (born 1992)

Personal information
- Born: 10 August 1992 (age 34); Harare, Zimbabwe
- Batting: Right-handed
- Bowling: Right-arm leg break
- Role: Opening batter

International information
- National side: Zimbabwe (2017–present)
- Test debut (cap 123): 4 February 2023 v West Indies
- Last Test: 28 June 2026 v Bangladesh
- ODI debut (cap 148): 4 June 2022 v Afghanistan
- Last ODI: 15 September 2026 v Australia
- ODI shirt no.: 9
- T20I debut (cap 66): 17 September 2021 v Scotland
- Last T20I: 6 September 2026 v South Africa

Domestic team information
- Years: Team
- 2013–present: Southern Rocks

Career statistics
Competition	Test	ODI	T20I	FC
Matches	3	23	22	57
Runs scored	312	523	389	3,163
Batting average	62.40	23.77	17.68	34.75
100s/50s	1/1	1/2	0/2	6/16
Top score	140	110	72	176
Balls bowled	–	28	12	1,137
Wickets	–	0	0	26
Bowling average	–	–	–	24.19
5 wickets in innings	–	–	–	0
10 wickets in match	–	–	–	0
Best bowling	–	–	–	4/44
Catches/stumpings	1/–	4/–	12/–	38/–
- Source: ESPNcricinfo, 16 September 2026

Innocent Kaia (born 10 August 1992) is a Zimbabwean cricketer. He made his Twenty20 debut for Zimbabwe in the 2017 Africa T20 Cup on 15 September 2017. In December 2020, he was selected to play for the Southern Rocks in the 2020–21 Logan Cup.

== Career ==
He made his Twenty20 International (T20I) debut on 17 September 2021 against Scotland. He made his One Day International (ODI) debut on 4 June 2022, for Zimbabwe against Afghanistan. He scored his first century in ODIs during Zimbabwe's series against Bangladesh.

On 4 February 2023, Kaia made his Test debut against the West Indies.
