= Ryan Burl =

Zimbabwean cricketer

Personal information
- Full name: Ryan Ponsonby Burl
- Born: 15 April 1994 (age 32); Marondera, Zimbabwe
- Batting: Left-handed
- Bowling: Right-arm leg break
- Role: All-rounder

International information
- National side: Zimbabwe (2017–present)
- Test debut (cap 104): 26 December 2017 v South Africa
- ODI debut (cap 132): 16 February 2017 v Afghanistan
- Last ODI: 11 January 2024 v Sri Lanka
- ODI shirt no.: 54
- T20I debut (cap 46): 5 February 2018 v Afghanistan
- Last T20I: 9 February 2026 v Oman
- T20I shirt no.: 54

Domestic team information
- Years: Team
- 2014–present: Mashonaland Eagles
- 2017–present: Mis Ainak Knights
- 2019-2020: Chattogram Challengers
- 2023–2024: Sylhet Strikers
- 2024–2025: Durbar Rajshahi
- 2025–2026: Rajshahi Warriors
- 2026: Lahore Qalandars

Career statistics
Competition	Test	ODI	T20I	FC
Matches	3	52	112	33
Runs scored	24	938	1,885	1,784
Batting average	4.80	24.68	26.18	35.68
100s/50s	0/0	0/6	0/4	3/12
Top score	16	83	67*	151
Balls bowled	228	730	1,136	2,145
Wickets	4	19	60	51
Bowling average	26.75	40.31	22.75	23.90
5 wickets in innings	0	1	0	0
10 wickets in match	0	0	0	0
Best bowling	2/16	5/10	3/13	4/34
Catches/stumpings	1/–	23/–	53/–	29/–
- Source: Cricinfo, 2 January 2026

Ryan Ponsonby Burl (born 15 April 1994) is a Zimbabwean cricketer who plays for the national side. He made his international debut for Zimbabwe in February 2017. He is currently the vice-captain of Zimbabwe in T20I.

== Early life ==
He quit his university education in Southampton and also sacrificed his county cricket commitments as he decided to play first-class cricket in Zimbabwe.

== Domestic and T20 career ==
In February 2017, Burl was named in an academy squad by Zimbabwe Cricket to tour England later that year. He made his Twenty20 debut for Mis Ainak Knights in the 2017 Shpageeza Cricket League on 12 September 2017.

Burl was the leading run-scorer in the 2017–18 Logan Cup for Rising Stars, with 401 runs in five matches. In November 2019, he was selected to play for the Chattogram Challengers in the 2019–20 Bangladesh Premier League.

In December 2020, Burl was selected to play for the Rhinos in the 2020–21 Logan Cup.

== International career ==
Burl was part of Zimbabwe's squad for the 2014 ICC Under-19 Cricket World Cup. He made his One Day International ODI debut against Afghanistan at the Harare Sports Club on 16 February 2017.

In December 2017, Burl was named in Zimbabwe's Test squad for their one-off Test against South Africa. He made his Test debut for Zimbabwe against South Africa in the Boxing Day Test on 26 December 2017.

Burl made his Twenty20 International (T20I) debut against Afghanistan on 5 February 2018. In September 2019, during the first match of the 2019–20 Bangladesh Tri-Nation Series against Bangladesh, Burl scored the second most runs by a Zimbabwe batsman off one over in a T20I match, with 30 against Shakib Al Hasan.

In May 2021, he pointed out the harsh realities and daily struggles of an average Zimbabwean cricketer by posting a tweet in his official Twitter handle about his torn shoes and how he applies glue to his shoes to play cricket and also urged sponsorship for himself as well as fellow Zimbabwean players. His tweet put him under some scrutiny after it exposed the flaws of Zimbabwe Cricket as it implied that Zimbabwe Cricket doesn't care about their players. Puma made a prompt response by agreeing to sponsor Ryan Burl's shoes.

In July 2022, he was named in Zimbabwe's squad for the 2022 ICC Men's T20 World Cup Global Qualifier B tournament which was held in Zimbabwe.

During the 15th over of Zimbabwe's innings against Bangladesh during the third and final match of the T20I series on 2 August 2022, which was also a decider with series already at 1-1, Burl smashed Nasum Ahmed's over for a record 34 runs including five sixes and a four to propel Zimbabwe to a total of 156/8 which they would later go on to defend successfully. Burl's 34 runs in an over is also the joint second most by any batsman in a single over of a T20I equalling with Tim Seifert and Ross Taylor's 34 runs rampage on Shivam Dube. He also added a crucial 79 run partnership in quick time with Luke Jongwe for the seventh wicket at a big run rate of 15.29 per over which lifted Zimbabwe from a precarious position of 67/6 to a respectable total of 156/8. Burl was awarded the player of the match for his 28 ball 54 which powered Zimbabwe to a 10 run victory and sealed the series for the hosts 2-1. It was also the first time Zimbabwe secured a home bilateral T20I series win against a full member nation.

During the third and final ODI against Australia at Townsville on 3 September 2022, Burl picked up his maiden ODI five-wicket haul and he also registered his career best bowling performance in ODIs by taking 5/10 within a space of just 18 deliveries inside three overs which sparked a batting collapse by Australia as he cleaned up the Aussie tail by picking up the last five wickets of the Australian innings. His bowling performance restricted Australia to just 141 runs and helped Zimbabwe to register a famous historic win over Australia as it turned out to be Zimbabwe's first ever ODI win as well as their first ever win in any format against Australia on Australian soil. For his record breaking performances with the ball, he was awarded the player of the match. His figures of 5/10 are also the best bowling figures by a Zimbabwean bowler on Australian soil against Australia and also the second best bowling spell by a visiting legspinner on Australian soil behind Yuzvendra Chahal's spell of 6/42 in 2019. He also became the first Zimbabwean bowler to take a fifer against Australia in ODIs, surpassing the previous record held by Duncan Fletcher during the 1983 Cricket World Cup and he also registered the second best bowling figures for Zimbabwe in ODI history just behind Graeme Cremer's haul of 6/46 which came against Kenya in 2009. His haul of 5 for 10 is also the cheapest five wicket haul taken by a bowler against Australia in ODIs surpassing the previous record held by Ravi Shastri.

He is set to play his next tournament at the ghansyam t10 leaguge hosted in Nairobi Kenya at sclp samaj grounds.
