= Tadiwanashe Marumani =

Zimbabwean cricketer

Personal information
- Born: 2 January 2002 (age 24); Harare, Zimbabwe
- Batting: Left-handed
- Bowling: Right-arm off-break
- Role: Wicket-keeper batter

International information
- National side: Zimbabwe (2021–present)
- ODI debut (cap 143): 16 July 2021 v Bangladesh
- Last ODI: 18 February 2025 v Ireland
- ODI shirt no.: 49
- T20I debut (cap 64): 21 April 2021 v Pakistan
- Last T20I: 9 February 2026 v Oman

Domestic team information
- Years: Team
- 2021: Rocks
- 2021–present: Eagles
- 2025-present: Islamabad United

Career statistics
Competition	ODI	T20I	FC	LA
Matches	21	61	34	71
Runs scored	225	1,145	1,771	1,743
Batting average	13.23	19.74	36.89	26.81
100s/50s	0/0	0/7	5/8	1/9
Top score	45	86	163	100
Catches/stumpings	10/0	23/3	56/10	49/3
- Source: Cricinfo, 2 January 2026

Tadiwanashe Marumani (born 2 January 2002) is a Zimbabwean cricketer. He made his international debut for the Zimbabwe cricket team in April 2021.

== Career ==
Marumani made his first-class debut on 18 March 2021, for Rocks, in the 2020–21 Logan Cup. Prior to his first-class debut, he was named in Zimbabwe's squad for the 2020 Under-19 Cricket World Cup. He made his Twenty20 debut on 11 April 2021, for Rocks, in the 2020–21 Zimbabwe Domestic Twenty20 Competition.

In April 2021, Marumani was named in Zimbabwe's squad for their Twenty20 International (T20I) series against Pakistan. He made his T20I debut on 21 April 2021, against Pakistan. He made his List A debut on 26 April 2021, for Rocks, in the 2020–21 Pro50 Championship. In July 2021, Marumani was named in Zimbabwe's One Day International (ODI) squad for their series against Bangladesh. Marumani made his ODI debut on 16 July 2021, for Zimbabwe against Bangladesh.

In February 2022, during the 2021–22 Logan Cup, Marumani scored his maiden century in first-class cricket, with 102 runs.
