= Luke Jongwe =

Zimbabwean cricketer

Personal information
- Full name: Luke Mafuwa Jongwe
- Born: 6 February 1995 (age 31); Harare, Zimbabwe
- Batting: Right-handed
- Bowling: Right-arm medium
- Role: Bowler

International information
- National side: Zimbabwe (2014-present)
- Only Test (cap 118): 7 May 2021 v Pakistan
- ODI debut (cap 120): 17 August 2014 v South Africa
- Last ODI: 11 January 2024 v Sri Lanka
- ODI shirt no.: 75
- T20I debut (cap 41): 27 September 2015 v Pakistan
- Last T20I: 7 July 2024 v India
- T20I shirt no.: 75

Domestic team information
- Years: Team
- 2013/14: Southern Rocks
- 2014/15–2017/18: Matabeleland Tuskers
- 2018/19: Eagles
- 2019/20–: Tuskers
- 2021/22–: Southerns

Career statistics
Competition	Test	ODI	T20I	FC
Matches	1	43	65	59
Runs scored	56	430	509	2,302
Batting average	28.00	13.87	15.42	27.73
100s/50s	0/0	0/0	0/0	2/14
Top score	37	46	35	132*
Balls bowled	102	1,415	1,020	6,995
Wickets	1	40	66	135
Bowling average	68.00	33.47	22.25	27.42
5 wickets in innings	0	1	0	3
10 wickets in match	0	0	0	0
Best bowling	1/68	5/6	4/18	5/32
Catches/stumpings	0/–	12/–	13/–	32/–
- Source: Cricinfo, 15 August 2024

Luke Mafuwa Jongwe (born 6 February 1995) is a Zimbabwean cricketer. He is a right-handed batter and right-arm medium pace bowler.

Jongwe was selected for three ODIs against South Africa when the latter team visited Zimbabwe in August 2014. He made his One Day International debut at Harare Sports Club against South Africa on 17 August 2014, where he bowled six overs and gave away 45 runs without taking a wicket and then scored 19 runs in a losing cause. He made his Twenty20 International debut against Pakistan on 27 September 2015.

In December 2020, Jongwe was selected to play for the Tuskers in the 2020–21 Logan Cup. In April 2021, Jongwe was named in Zimbabwe's squad for their Twenty20 International (T20I) series against Pakistan, more than five years since his last international match. On 26 April 2021, Jongwe was named in Zimbabwe's Test squad, also for the series against Pakistan. He made his Test debut for Zimbabwe, against Pakistan, on 7 May 2021.
