= Wessly Madhevere =

Zimbabwean cricketer (born 2000)

Personal information
- Full name: Wessly Nyasha Madhevere
- Born: 4 September 2000 (age 26); Harare, Zimbabwe
- Batting: Right-handed
- Bowling: Right-arm off-break
- Role: All-rounder

International information
- National side: Zimbabwe (2020–present)
- Test debut (cap 114): 2 March 2021 v Afghanistan
- Last Test: 5 November 2026 v Afghanistan
- ODI debut (cap 141): 1 March 2020 v Bangladesh
- Last ODI: 23 October 2026 v Afghanistan
- ODI shirt no.: 17
- T20I debut (cap 59): 9 March 2020 v Bangladesh
- Last T20I: 1 November 2026 v Afghanistan
- T20I shirt no.: 17

Career statistics
Competition	Test	ODI	T20I	FC
Matches	10	49	90	47
Runs scored	475	946	1,376	2,470
Batting average	31.66	20.56	17.87	38.00
100s/50s	1/3	0/7	0/7	7/12
Top score	100*	75	73*	150
Balls bowled	564	1,000	492	4,081
Wickets	7	19	19	73
Bowling average	46.14	45.05	31.42	31.00
5 wickets in innings	0	0	0	2
10 wickets in match	0	0	0	0
Best bowling	2/2	3/36	3/20	7/105
Catches/stumpings	5/–	17/–	36/–	41/–
- Source: Cricinfo, 12 November 2026

Wessly Nyasha Madhevere (born 4 September 2000) is a Zimbabwean cricketer. He made his international debut for the Zimbabwe cricket team in March 2020.

== Career ==
Madhevere made his List A debut on 8 February 2020, for Mashonaland Eagles in the 2019–20 Pro50 Championship. Prior to his List A debut, he was named as the vice-captain of Zimbabwe's squad for the 2020 Under-19 Cricket World Cup. He was also part of Zimbabwe's teams for the 2016 Under-19 Cricket World Cup and the 2018 Under-19 Cricket World Cup, with the International Cricket Council (ICC) naming him as the rising star of the squad following the 2018 tournament. He made his first-class debut on 20 February 2020, for Mashonaland Eagles in the 2019–20 Logan Cup.

In February 2020, Madhevere was named in Zimbabwe's One Day International (ODI) and Twenty20 International (T20I) squads for their tour against Bangladesh. He made his ODI debut against Bangladesh, on 1 March 2020. He made his T20I debut, also against Bangladesh, on 9 March 2020.

In December 2020, Madhevere was selected to play for the Eagles in the 2020–21 Logan Cup. In February 2021, Madhevere was named in Zimbabwe's Test squad for their series against Afghanistan. He made his Test debut for Zimbabwe, against Afghanistan, on 2 March 2021.

In March 2023, he was named in the Zimbabwe's ODI squad for their series against the Netherlands. In the second ODI, on 23 March 2023, he became the third cricketer from Zimbabwe to take a hat-trick in ODIs.

In December 2023, he was suspended by Zimbabwe Cricket after failing a drugs test. On 25 January 2024, Zimbabwe Cricket announced that Madhevere as well as teammate Brandon Mavuta had been suspended for four months, as well as fined 50% of their salaries for three months, effective from January 2024.
