= 2026–27 Pro50 Championship =

Cricket tournament

- Dates: 23 October – 29 November 2026
- Administrator: Zimbabwe Cricket
- Cricket format: List A
- Tournament format: Double round-robin
- Host: Zimbabwe
- Participants: 5
- Matches: 21

The 2026–27 Pro50 Championship was the 24th edition of the Pro50 Championship, a List A cricket tournament that was played in Zimbabwe. It started on 23 October and the final was held on 29 November 2026.

The Southern Rocks were the defending champions.

== Points table ==
Pos	Team	Pld	W	L	NR	BP	Pts	NRR
1	Matabeleland Tuskers	2	2	0	0	1	9	0.782
2	Mashonaland Eagles	2	2	0	0	0	8	0.800
3	Mid West Rhinos	0	0	0	0	0	0	—
4	Mountaineers	2	0	2	0	0	0	−0.782
5	Southern Rocks	2	0	2	0	0	0	−0.800

Updated to match(es) played on 25 October 2026. Source: Cricinfo

=== League progression ===
Team	Group matches								Play-offs
Team	1	2	3	4	5	6	7	8	Final
Mountaineers	0	0							
Mid West Rhinos									
Mashonaland Eagles	4	8							
Matabeleland Tuskers	4	9							
Southern Rocks	0	0							

Win	Loss	Tie	No result	Eliminated

- Note: The total points at the end of each group match are listed.
- Note: Click on the points or results to see the match summary.

== Fixtures ==
=== Round 1 ===
Match 1
23 October 2026
09:30
Scorecard

Mountaineers; 234/7 (50 overs)	v	Matabeleland Tuskers; 235/7 (48 overs)
Ronak Patel 58 (107); Tinotenda Maposa 2/32 (9 overs)		Hamid Ali 75 (88); Ronak Patel (5 overs)

Matabeleland Tuskers won by 3 wickets
Mutare Sports Club, Mutare
Umpires: Forster Mutizwa and David Shawane
Player of the match: Milton Shumba (Matabeleland Tuskers)

- Matabeleland Tuskers won the toss and elected to field.
- Jeffery Mhuriyengwe (Matabeleland Tuskers), Simbarashe Mudzengerere and Takudzwa Nyamugure (Mountaineers) all made their List A debuts.
- Points: Matabeleland Tuskers 4, Mountaineers 0

Match 2
23 October 2026
09:30
Scorecard

Mashonaland Eagles; 246/9 (50 overs)	v	Southern Rocks; 119/6 (25 overs)
Rodney Mupfudza 88 (100); Derrick Sadoki 2/49 (9 overs)		Johnathan Campbell 39* (48); Kudakwashe Macheka 3/34 (6 overs)

Mashonaland Eagles won by 58 runs (DLS method)
Masvingo Sports Club, Masvingo
Umpires: Christopher Phiri and Percival Sizara
Player of the match: Rodney Mupfudza (Mashonaland Eagles)

- Southern Rocks won the toss and elected to field.
- Rain prevented any further play.
- Lennox Chando (Southern Rocks) made his List A debut.
- Southern Rocks were 58 runs behind in DLS par score when rain stopped the match.
- Points: Mashonaland Eagles 4, Southern Rocks 0

=== Round 2 ===
Match 3
25 October 2026
09:30
Scorecard

Mountaineers; 185 (43.5 overs)	v	Matabeleland Tuskers; 186/4 (36.4 overs)
Simbarashe Mudzengerere 44 (68); Tinotenda Maposa 2/24 (10 overs)		Milton Shumba 62* (75); Dion Myers 2/15 (4 overs)

Matabeleland Tuskers won by 6 wickets
Mutare Sports Club, Mutare
Umpires: Forster Mutizwa and David Shawane
Player of the match: Milton Shumba (Matabeleland Tuskers)

- Matabeleland Tuskers won the toss and elected to field.
- Points: Matabeleland Tuskers 5, Mountaineers 0

Match4
25 October 2026
09:30
Scorecard

Southern Rocks; 286/7 (50 overs)	v	Mashonaland Eagles; 284 (48.1 overs)
Rodney Mupfudza 88 (80); Roy Kaia 2/39 (10 overs)		Nathaniel Hlabangana 113 (115); Munashe Zata 4/51 (9.1 overs)

Mashonaland Eagles won by 2 runs
Masvingo Sports Club, Masvingo
Umpires: Christopher Phiri and Percival Sizara
Player of the match: Rodney Mupfudza (Mashonaland Eagles)

- Southern Rocks won the toss and elected field.
- Munashe Zata (Mashonaland Eagles) made his List A debut.
- Nathaniel Hlabangana and Panashe Taruvinga (Southern Rocks) both scored their maiden century in List A cricket.
- Points: Mashonaland Eagles 4, Southern Rocks 0

=== Round 3 ===
Match 5
30 October 2026
09:30
Scorecard

Mid West Rhinos	v	Mountaineers

Kwekwe Sports Club, Kwekwe

Match 6
30 October 2026
09:30
Scorecard

Mashonaland Eagles	v	Matabeleland Tuskers

Takashinga Sports Club, Highfield, Harare

=== Round 4 ===
Match 7
1 November 2026
09:30
Scorecard

Mid West Rhinos	v	Mountaineers

Kwekwe Sports Club, Kwekwe

Match 8
1 November 2026
09:30
Scorecard

Mashonaland Eagles	v	Matabeleland Tuskers

Takashinga Sports Club, Highfield, Harare

=== Round 5 ===
Match 9
6 November 2026
09:30
Scorecard

Mountaineers	v	Southern Rocks

Mutare Sports Club, Mutare

Match 10
6 November 2026
09:30
Scorecard

Matabeleland Tuskers	v	Mid West Rhinos

Bulawayo Athletic Club, Bulawayo

=== Round 6 ===
Match 11
8 November 2026
09:30
Scorecard

Mountaineers	v	Southern Rocks

Mutare Sports Club, Mutare

Match 12
8 November 2026
09:30
Scorecard

Matabeleland Tuskers	v	Mid West Rhinos

Bulawayo Athletic Club, Bulawayo

=== Round 7 ===
Match 13
13 November 2026
09:30
Scorecard

Mashonaland Eagles	v	Mountaineers

Old Hararians, Harare

Match 14
13 November 2026
09:30
Scorecard

Southern Rocks	v	Mid West Rhinos

Masvingo Sports Club, Masvingo

=== Round 8 ===
Match 15
15 November 2026
09:30
Scorecard

Mashonaland Eagles	v	Mountaineers

Old Hararians, Harare

Match 16
15 November 2026
09:30
Scorecard

Southern Rocks	v	Mid West Rhinos

Masvingo Sports Club, Masvingo

=== Round 9 ===
Match 17
20 November 2026
09:30
Scorecard

Matabeleland Tuskers	v	Southern Rocks

Mosi-oa-Tunya International Cricket Stadium, Victoria Falls

Match 18
20 November 2026
09:30
Scorecard

Mid West Rhinos	v	Mashonaland Eagles

Kwekwe Sports Club, Kwekwe

=== Round 10 ===
Match 19
22 November 2026
09:30
Scorecard

Matabeleland Tuskers	v	Southern Rocks

Mosi-oa-Tunya International Cricket Stadium, Victoria Falls

Match 20
22 November 2026
09:30
Scorecard

Mid West Rhinos	v	Mashonaland Eagles

Kwekwe Sports Club, Kwekwe

== Final ==
Final
29 November 2026
09:30
Scorecard

1st placed team	v	2nd placed team
