= 2025–26 Logan Cup =

Cricket tournament

- Dates: 26 October 2025 – 30 March 2026
- Administrator: Zimbabwe Cricket
- Cricket format: First-class cricket (4 days)
- Tournament format: Double round-robin
- Champions: Southern Rocks (2nd title)
- Participants: 5
- Matches: 20
- Most runs: Jalat Khan (28) (Rocks)
- Most wickets: Tafadzwa Tsiga (563) (Rocks)

The 2025–26 Logan Cup was the 32nd edition of the Logan Cup, a first-class cricket competition in Zimbabwe, which started on 26 October 2025 and concluded in March 2026. The season, similar to previous seasons, played in conjunction with the 2025–26 Pro50 Championship, where the 50-over fixture played after the first-class game.

Southern Rocks won their second title.

== Teams and standing ==
=== Points table ===
Pos	Team	Pld	W	L	D	Pts	Result
1	Southern Rocks	8	4	0	4	110	Champion
2	Mashonaland Eagles	8	4	1	3	103	
3	Mid West Rhinos	8	3	1	4	86	
4	Mountaineers	8	1	5	2	50	
5	Matabeleland Tuskers	8	0	5	3	43	

Updated to match(es) played on 30 March-2 April 2026. Source: ESPNcricinfo
- 10 points for a win, 6 for a tie, 5 for a draw, and 0 for a loss. An extra 2 points are awarded for an innings victory.
- Batting bonus points: 1 point each for reaching 200, 250, 300, and 350 runs in each innings.
- Bowling bonus points: 1 point each for taking 3, 5, 7, and 9 wickets in each innings

=== Match summary ===
The total team points at the end of each round are listed.

Team	Round										Total
Team	1	2	3	4	5	6	7	8	9	10	Total
Southern Rocks	15	23	31	31	45	65	78	98	98	110	110
Mashonaland Eagles	9	9	14	34	40	56	56	74	91	103	103
Mid West Rhinos	11	20	20	34	49	53	64	64	71	86	86
Mountaineers	0	9	15	18	22	22	38	42	46	50	50
Matabeleland Tuskers	5	13	19	23	23	27	31	34	43	43	43

Win	Loss	Draw	Bye	Abandoned

== Fixtures ==
=== Round 1 ===
26–29 October 2025
Scorecard

Mid West Rhinos	v	Mashonaland Eagles
274 (111.5 overs); Villan Changa 62 (143); Alex Falao 5/56 (19 overs)		155 (81.1 overs); Craig Ervine 38 (77); Hendrichs Macheke 3/20 (13.1 overs)
254/8d (69.4 overs); Nyasha Mayavo 92 (140); Alex Falao 3/49 (12 overs)		226/3 (73.4 overs); Rodney Mupfudza 93 (193); Trevor Gwandu 2/38 (13 overs)

Match drawn
Queens Sports Club, Bulawayo
Umpires: Stanley Gogwe and David Shawane
Player of the match: Alex Falao (Mashonaland Eagles)

- Mid West Rhinos won the toss and elected to bat.
- Villan Changa, Dylan Nzvenga (Mid West Rhinos) and Ryan Simbi (Mashonaland Eagles) all made their first-class debuts.
- Points: Mid West Rhinos 11, Mashonaland Eagles 9

26–29 October 2025
Scorecard

Matabeleland Tuskers	v	Southern Rocks
242 (76.5 overs); Tawanda Maposa 82 (92); Takudzwa Chataira 3/35 (16.5 overs)		209 (73.1 overs); Roy Kaia 63 (163); Ernest Masuku 6/40 (17 overs)
167 (68.2 overs); Ernest Masuku 45 (63); Roy Kaia 3/31 (22 overs)		201/6 (62.3 overs); Johnathan Campbell 41 (71); Ainsley Ndlovu 3/40 (23 overs)

Southern Rocks won by 4 wickets
Kwekwe Sports Club, Kwekwe
Umpires: Christopher Phiri and Justice Tapfumaneyi
Player of the match: Roy Kaia (Southern Rocks)

- Matabeleland Tuskers won the toss and elected to bat.
- Tawanda Maposa (Matabeleland Tuskers) made his first-class debut.
- Points: Southern Rocks 15, Matabeleland Tuskers 5

=== Round 2 ===
6–9 November 2025
Scorecard

Matabeleland Tuskers	v	Mountaineers
321 (103.4 overs); Taffy Mupariwa 81 (169); Wellington Masakadza 4/46 (13.4 overs)		9/2d (4 overs); Brian Bennett 7* (13); Tinotenda Maposa 1/2 (2 overs)
Forfeit		52/0 (8 overs); Brian Bennett 29* (19)

Match drawn
Kwekwe Sports Club, Kwekwe
Umpires: Nkosehle Ndiweni and Langton Rusere
Player of the match: Wellington Masakadza (Mountaineers)

- Mountaineers won the toss and elected to field.
- Only 49, 35 and 2.2 overs play was possible on day 1, 2 and 3 respectively, due to rain.
- Points: Matabeleland Tuskers 8, Mountaineers 9

6–9 November 2025
Scorecard

Rocks	v	Rhinos
347 (115.2 overs); Tafadzwa Tsiga 110 (205); Graeme Cremer 9/144 (46.2 overs)		49/1 (18 overs); Ben Curran 23* (47); Newman Nyamhuri 1/16 (5 overs)

Match drawn
Queens Sports Club, Bulawayo
Umpires: Iknow Chabi and Stanley Gogwe
Player of the match: Graeme Cremer (Mid West Rhinos)

- Southern Rocks won the toss and elected to bat.
- Only 61.2 overs play was possible on day 1 due to rain.
- No play was possible on day 2 and 4 due to rain.
- Points: Mid West Rhinos 9, Southern Rocks 8

=== Round 3 ===
17–20 November 2025
Scorecard

Mountaineers	v	Southern Rocks
116/8d (38.2 overs); Timycen Maruma 39 (70); Jalat Khan 4/40 (14.2 overs)		119/4d (30.2 overs); Johnathan Campbell 56 (67); Shafi Ullah 3/26 (9.2 overs)
126/2 (39 overs); Nick Welch 77 (98); Jalat Khan 1/16 (4 overs)

Match drawn
Mutare Sports Club, Mutare
Umpires: Forster Mutizwa and Oscar Tafirenyika
Player of the match: Jalat Khan (Southern Rocks)

- Southern Rocks won the toss and elected to field.
- Only 4.2, 6 and 19.4 overs of play was possile on day 1,2 and day 3 respectively, due to rain.
- Muhammad Sheraz and Shafi Ullah (Mountaineers) both made their first-class debuts.
- Points: Mountaineers 6, Southern Rocks 8

17–20 November 2025
Scorecard

Mashonaland Eagles	v	Matabeleland Tuskers
52/4d (19.5 overs); Tinashe Kamunhukamwe 22 (21); Ernest Masuku 4/31 (8.5 overs)		Forfeit
28/2 (7.2 overs); Kudzai Maunze 19* (25); Ernest Masuku 1/8 (4 overs)

Match drawn
Harare Sports Club, Harare
Umpires: Tafadzwa Musakwa and Percival Sizara
Player of the match: Ernest Masuku (Matabeleland Tuskers)

- Matabeleland Tuskers won the toss and elected to field.
- No play was possible on day 1 due to rain.
- Only 16.3, 3.1 and 7.3 overs of play was possible on day 2, 3 and day 4 respectively, due to rain.
- Ali Hasnain (Mashonaland Eagles), Ali Khan and Muslim Khan (Matabeleland Tuskers) all made their first-class debuts.
- Points: Mashonaland Eagles 5, Matabeleland Tuskers 6

=== Round 4 ===
28–30 November 2025
Scorecard

Mountaineers	v	Mashonaland Eagles
113 (43.5 overs); Alistair Frost 33* (109); Kashif Afridi 3/15 (8 overs)		353/8d (95 overs); Tinashe Kamunhukamwe 175 (245); Tendai Chatara 3/70 (20 overs)
180 (51 overs); Joylord Gumbie 46 (61); Ali Hasnain 5/48 (17 overs)

Mashonaland Eagles won by an innings and 60 runs
Harare Sports Club, Harare
Umpires: Tafadzwa Musakwa and Langton Rusere
Player of the match: Ali Hasnain (Mashonaland Eagles)

- Eagles won the toss and elected to field.
- Only 58.2 overs of play was possible due to rain.
- Kashif Afridi (Mashonaland Eagles) made his first-class debut.
- Ali Hasnain (Mashonaland Eagles) took his first five-wicket haul in first-class cricket.
- Points: Mashonaland Eagles 20, Mountaineers 3

28–29 November 2025
Scorecard

Matabeleland Tuskers	v	Mid West Rhinos
118 (44 overs); Nkosana Mpofu 31 (64); Maaz Khan 5/28 (5 overs)		172 (53.4 overs); Takudzwanashe Kaitano 79 (137); Muslim Khan 3/28 (8.4 overs)
67 (23.4 overs); Nkosana Mpofu 29 (44); Antum Naqvi 5/28 (11.4 overs)		16/0 (3.5 overs); Takudzwanashe Kaitano 8* (11)

Mid West Rhinos won by 10 wickets
Queens Sports Club, Bulawayo
Umpires: Forster Mutizwa and Christopher Phiri
Player of the match: Antum Naqvi (Rhinos)

- Mid West Rhinos won the toss and elected to field.
- Muhammad Khwaja and Maaz Khan (Mid West Rhinos) made his first-class debut.
- Maaz Khan (Mid West Rhinos) took his maiden five-wicket haul in first-class cricket.
- Points: Mid West Rhinos 14, Matabeleland Tuskers 4

=== Round 5 ===
3–6 February 2026
Scorecard

Mountaineers	v	Mid West Rhinos
99 (33.5 overs); Spencer Magodo 18 (29); Hendrichs Macheke 3/17 (5 overs)		244 (63.5 overs); Tarisai Musakanda 61 (79); Muhammad Sheraz 5/47 (13 overs)
252 (60.5 overs); Ronak Patel 76 (128); Maaz Khan 6/75 (16.5 overs)		109/2 (30.3 overs); Antum Naqvi 54* (77); Tendai Chatara 1/18 (5 overs)

Mid West Rhinos won by 8 wickets
Kwekwe Sports Club, Kwekwe
Umpires: Stanley Gogwe and Christopher Phiri
Player of the match: Maaz Khan (Mid West Rhinos)

- Mountaineers won the toss and elected to bat.
- Anesu Kamuriwo and Ronak Patel (Mountaineers) both made their first-class debuts.
- Muhammad Sheraz (Mountaineers) took his maiden five-wicket haul in first-class cricket.
- Points: Mid West Rhinos 15, Mountaineers 4

3–6 February 2026
Scorecard

Southern Rocks	v	Mashonaland Eagles
120 (33.2 overs); Ali Asfand 32* (49); Alex Falao 3/14 (9 overs)		258 (57 overs); Wessly Madhevere 74 (88); Jalat Khan 4/66 (11 overs)
352 (95.2 overs); Tafadzwa Tsiga 102 (165); Ali Hasnain 5/95 (27 overs)		179 (50.4 overs); Ryan Kamwemba 49 (72); Newman Nyamhuri 5/43 (14.4 overs)

Southern Rocks won by 35 runs
Masvingo Sports Club, Masvingo
Umpires: David Shawane and Percival Sizara
Player of the match: Newman Nyamhuri (Southern Rocks)

- Southern Rocks won the toss and elected to bat.
- Newman Nyamhuri (Southern Rocks) took his maiden five-wicket haul in first-class cricket.
- Points: Southern Rocks 14, Mashonaland Eagles 6

=== Round 6 ===
14–17 February 2026
Scorecard

Mashonaland Eagles	v	Mid West Rhinos
297 (76 overs); Wessly Madhevere 100 (132); Victor Chirwa 4/78 (20 overs)		164 (50 overs); Ahsan Ali Aqil 47 (100); Muhammad Kashif 5/39 (12 overs)
297/7d (71.1 overs); Wessly Madhevere 111 (127); Hendrichs Macheke 4/46 (11.1 overs)		265 (68.2 overs); Ahsan Ali Aqil 88* (156); Tanaka Chivanga 3/36 (8.4 overs)

Mashonaland Eagles won by 165 runs
Harare Sports Club, Harare
Umpires: Tafadzwa Musakwa and Forster Mutizwa
Player of the match: Wessly Madhevere (Mashonaland Eagles)

- Mid West Rhinos won the toss and elected to field.
- Terrence Makoroma (Mid West Rhinos) made his first-class debut.
- Muhammad Kashif (Mashonaland Eagles) took his maiden five-wicket haul in first-class cricket.
- Points: Mashonaland Eagles 16, Mid West Rhinos 4

14–17 February 2026
Scorecard

Southern Rocks	v	Matabeleland Tuskers
458 (136.5 overs); Roy Kaia 197 (329); Nkosana Mpofu 4/75 (22.5 overs)		195 (85.1 overs); Hamid Ali 74 (120); Ali Asfand 4/24 (22.1 overs)
		200 (64 overs) (f/o); Ali Khan 36 (54); Jalat Khan 2/7 (4 overs)

Southern Rocks won by an innings and 63 runs
Queens Sports Club, Bulawayo
Umpires: Iknow Chabi and Collin Tlou
Player of the match: Roy Kaia (Southern Rocks)

- Southern Rocks won the toss and elected to bat.
- Points: Southern Rocks 20, Matabeleland Tuskers 4

=== Round 7 ===
25–28 February 2026
Scorecard

Matabeleland Tuskers	v	Mountaineers
166 (48.1 overs); Hamid Ali 47 (66); Tendai Chatara 3/13 (9 overs)		286 (106.4 overs); Alistair Frost 55 (198); Tanatswa Bechani 4/61 (34 overs)
213 (72.1 overs); Brian Chari 82 (112); Muhammad Sheraz 5/44 (18.1 overs)		95/3 (20.1 overs); Timycen Maruma 30* (16); Muslim Khan 2/26 (6 overs)

Mountaineers won by 7 wickets
Queens Sports Club, Bulawayo
Umpires: Nkosehle Ndiweni and Langton Rusere
Player of the match: Michael Frost (Mountaineers)

- Matabeleland Tuskers won the toss and elected to bat.
- Jeffery Mhuriyengwe (Matabeleland Tuskers) made his first-class debut.
- Points: Mountaineers 16, Matabeleland Tuskers 4

25–28 February 2026
Scorecard

Southern Rocks	v	Mid West Rhinos
496/9d (128.4 overs); Tafadzwa Tsiga 143 (187); Victor Chirwa 5/114 (37.4 overs)		291 (94.2 overs); Villan Changa 99 (201); Jalat Khan 3/59 (21.2 overs)
		357/7 (106 overs) (f/o); Tarisai Musakanda 118 (280); Johnathan Campbell 2/45 (10 overs)

Match drawn
Harare Sports Club, Harare
Umpires: Iknow Chabi and David Shawane
Player of the match: Tarisai Musakanda (Mid West Rhinos)

- Southern Rocks won the toss and elected to bat.
- Shelton Mazvitorera made his first-class debut after replacing Newman Nyamhuri as an injury substitute for Southern Rocks during Mid West Rhinos' first innings.
- Points: Southern Rocks 13, Mid West Rhinos 11

=== Round 8 ===
8–11 March 2026
Scorecard

Southern Rocks	v	Mountaineers
350/9d (88.2 overs); Innocent Kaia 176 (252); Vincent Masekesa 4/72 (21 overs)		165 (67.2 overs); Timycen Maruma 42 (103); Jalat Khan 4/46 (20.2 overs)
		165 (56.3 overs) (f/o); Nick Welch 64 (98); Jalat Khan 4/51 (11.3 overs)

Southern Rocks won by an innings and 20 runs
Harare Sports Club, Harare
Umpires: Percival Sizara and Oscar Tafirenyika
Player of the match: Innocent Kaia (Southern Rocks)

- Mountaineers won the toss and elected to field.
- Points: Southern Rocks 20, Mountaineers 4

8–11 March 2026
Scorecard

Mashonaland Eagles	v	Matabeleland Tuskers
351/8d (108.1 overs); Craig Ervine 116* (182); Ernest Masuku 5/68 (27 overs)		95 (36 overs); Hamid Ali 23 (38); Kudakwashe Macheka 5/21 (10 overs)
16/0 (4 overs); Tinashe Kamunhukamwe 8* (11)		271 (97.2 overs) (f/o); Bright Phiri 82 (207); Ali Hasnain 2/35 (27 overs)

Mashonaland Eagles won by 10 wickets
Queens Sports Club, Bulawayo
Umpires: Forster Mutizwa and Collin Tlou
Player of the match: Kudakwashe Macheka (Mashonaland Eagles)

- Matabeleland Tuskers won the toss and elected to field.
- Kudakwashe Macheka (Mashonaland Eagles) took his maiden five-wicket haul in first-class cricket.
- Points: Mashonaland Eagles 18, Matabeleland Tuskers 3

=== Round 9 ===
19–22 March 2026
Scorecard

Mashonaland Eagles	v	Mountaineers
319 (81.4 overs); Tadiwanashe Marumani 66 (111); Vincent Masekesa 3/82 (18.4 overs)		170 (59.2 overs); Nick Welch 43 (46); Muhammad Kashif 3/31 (12 overs)
183 (34.2 overs); Tinashe Kamunhukamwe 43 (49); Muhammad Sheraz 6/54 (11.2 overs)		144 (53.4 overs); Nick Welch 37 (31); Ali Hasnain 5/54 (17.4 overs)

Mashonaland Eagles won by 188 runs
Harare Sports Club, Harare
Umpires: Langton Rusere and Oscar Tafirenyika
Player of the match: Muhammad Kashif (Mashonaland Eagles)

- Mashonaland Eagles won the toss and elected to bat.
- Points: Mashonaland Eagles 17, Mountaineers 4

19–22 March 2026
Scorecard

Mid West Rhinos	v	Matabeleland Tuskers
288 (88.2 overs); Ryan Burl 107 (173); Tinotenda Maposa 3/47 (13 overs)		63/2 (26 overs); Milton Shumba 25 (58); Hendrichs Macheke 2/26 (7 overs)

Match drawn
Queens Sports Club, Bulawayo
Umpires: Iknow Chabi and Christopher Phiri
Player of the match: Ryan Burl (Mid West Rhinos)

- Mid West Rhinos won the toss and elected to bat.
- Only 26 overs play was possible on day 2 due to rain.
- No play was possible on day 3 and 4 due to rain.
- Points: Mid West Rhinos 7, Matabeleland Tuskers 9

=== Round 10 ===
30 March – 2 April 2026
Scorecard

Mid West Rhinos	v	Mountaineers
243 (70.3 overs); Tarisai Musakanda 56 (91); Vincent Masekesa 4/76 (22.3 overs)		127 (45 overs); Tatenda Chimugoro 23 (31); Zaman Khwaja 6/45 (13 overs)
168 (40.3 overs); Ahsan Ali Aqil 52 (80); Muhammad Sheraz 5/43 (11.3 overs)		78 (40.3 overs); Prosper Mugeri 12 (15); Zaman Khwaja 4/5 (5.3 overs)

Mid West Rhinos won by 206 runs
Queens Sports Club, Bulawayo
Umpires: David Shawane and Oscar Tafirenyika
Player of the match: Zaman Khwaja (Mid West Rhinos)

- Mid West Rhinos won the toss and elected to field.
- Tatenda Chimugoro (Mountaineers) and Zaman Khwaja (Mid West Rhinos) both made their first-class debuts.
- Zaman Khwaja (Mid West Rhinos) took his maiden five-wicket haul in first-class cricket.
- Points: Mid West Rhinos 15, Mountaineers 4

30 March – 2 April 2026
Scorecard

Mashonaland Eagles	v	Southern Rocks
362/8d (116 overs); Craig Ervine 108 (205); Takudzwa Chataira 2/78 (24 overs)		564/8d (154 overs); Matthew Campbell 106 (149); Tanaka Chivanga 2/81 (23 overs)
133/2 (49 overs); Dion Myers 55* (124); Roy Kaia 1/11 (6 overs)

Match drawn
Harare Sports Club, Harare
Umpires: Forster Mutizwa and Langton Rusere
Player of the match: Roy Kaia (Southern Rocks)

- Southern Rocks won the toss and elected to field.
- Points: Mashonaland Eagles 12, Southern Rocks 12

== Statistics ==
=== Most runs ===
Player	Team	Mat	Inns	Runs	Ave	SR	HS	100	50	4s	6s
Tafadzwa Tsiga	Southern Rocks	8	9	563	80.42	65.61	143	4	0	54	7
Tinashe Kamunhukamwe	Mashonaland Eagles	8	15	557	39.78	66.07	175	1	2	76	8
Craig Ervine	Mashonaland Eagles	7	13	490	54.44	54.74	116*	2	2	55	7
Johnathan Campbell	Southern Rocks	8	10	442	49.11	70.83	95	0	5	52	4
Innocent Kaia	Southern Rocks	7	8	409	51.12	62.53	176	2	1	52	2
Source: ESPNCricInfo

=== Most wickets ===
Player	Team	Mat	Inns	Wkts	BBI	Avg	Econ	SR	5w	10w
Jalat Khan	Southern Rocks	5	10	28	4/40	13.96	3.01	27.75	4	0
Muhammad Sheraz	Mountaineers	6	10	25	6/54	17.08	3.41	30.00	0	4
Ali Hasnain	Mashonaland Eagles	6	9	25	5/48	18.12	2.67	40.60	0	3
Vincent Masekesa	Mountaineers	8	12	25	4/72	29.92	4.21	42.64	2	0
Muhammad Kashif	Mashonaland Eagles	5	9	23	5/39	16.52	3.35	29.56	1	1
Source: ESPNCricInfo
