= List of Southern Rocks first-class cricketers =

This is a list of players who have played first-class cricket for the Southern Rocks, a Zimbabwean cricket team. Southern Rocks have played 25 first-class matches, but are yet to win a game. Thirty players have played for the team at first-class level.

== List of players ==
Key

played international cricket
* captained the team in at least one match
† played as wicket-keeper for at least one match

№	Name	Nationality	First	Last	Mat	Runs	HS	Avg	100	50	Wkt	BB	Ave	5wi	10wm	C	St	Ref
№	Name	Nationality	First	Last	Mat	Batting					Bowling					Fielding		Ref
1	Keith Kondo	Zimbabwe	2009–10	2009–10	1	11	11	5.50	0	0	–	–	–	–	–	0	0	
2	Erick Chauluka	Zimbabwe	2009–10	2010–11	11	417	113*	23.16	1	1	0	0/7	–	0	0	1	0	
3	Chamu Chibhabha *	Zimbabwe	2009–10	2010–11	16	874	105	31.21	1	7	15	5/66	53.80	1	0	7	0	
4	Robertson Chinyengetere	Zimbabwe	2009–10	2010–11	12	406	71	23.88	0	3	13	3/15	34.76	0	0	10	0	
5	Alester Maregwede *†	Zimbabwe	2009–10	2010–11	13	456	82*	19.00	0	2	–	–	–	–	–	20	2	
6	Richmond Mutumbami †	Zimbabwe	2009–10	2010–11	15	567	100	27.00	1	3	–	–	–	–	–	28	4	
7	Tendai Chisoro	Zimbabwe	2009–10	2010–11	10	275	50	19.64	0	1	10	3/79	69.10	0	0	5	0	
8	Patient Charumbira	Zimbabwe	2009–10	2009–10	1	1	1	0.50	0	0	1	1/31	51.00	0	0	0	0	
9	Blessing Mahwire	Zimbabwe	2009–10	2010–11	18	453	66	22.65	0	2	38	5/92	36.50	1	0	6	0	
10	Tafadzwa Kamungozi	Zimbabwe	2009–10	2010–11	15	325	71*	14.13	0	1	39	4/60	40.12	0	0	12	0	
11	Hilary Matanga	Zimbabwe	2009–10	2010–11	20	328	38	18.22	0	0	48	5/98	38.89	1	0	9	0	
12	Stephan Marillier	Zimbabwe	2009–10	2010–11	14	810	148*	32.40	1	5	–	–	–	–	–	6	0	
13	Steve Tikolo *	Kenya	2009–10	2010–11	12	709	92	35.45	0	6	18	3/23	32.55	0	0	12	0	
14	Craig Ervine	Zimbabwe	2009–10	2010–11	13	817	167*	38.90	2	5	0	0/3	–	0	0	10	0	
15	Darlington Matambanadzo	Zimbabwe	2009–10	2009–10	3	122	82	24.40	0	1	0	0/14	–	0	0	2	0	
16	Tendai Chitongo	Zimbabwe	2009–10	2010–11	12	372	69	18.60	0	2	7	4/53	96.85	0	0	10	0	
17	Thomas Odoyo	Kenya	2009–10	2009–10	7	181	47	18.10	0	0	10	3/39	37.00	0	0	0	0	
18	Tendai Machiri	Zimbabwe	2009–10	2009–10	5	178	79	22.25	0	1	0	0/31	–	0	0	4	0	
19	Brian Vitori	Zimbabwe	2009–10	2010–11	11	38	10	4.75	0	0	27	6/55	39.70	1	0	3	0	
19	Tanyaradzwa Munyaradzi	Zimbabwe	2009–10	2010–11	4	43	20	8.60	0	0	8	4/58	33.25	0	0	0	0	
20	Kudzai Maunze	Zimbabwe	2009–10	2009–10	2	18	13	6.00	0	0	–	–	–	–	–	0	0	
21	Keith Kulinga	Zimbabwe	2009–10	2010–11	4	4	4	1.33	0	0	9	5/114	37.11	1	0	0	0	
22	Sean Ervine	Zimbabwe	2009–10	2009–10	2	393	208	98.25	2	0	4	2/63	50.50	0	0	1	0	
23	Tatenda Taibu *†	Zimbabwe	2010–11	2010–11	3	312	153*	78.00	1	2	–	–	–	–	–	3	0	
24	Stuart Matsikenyeri *	Zimbabwe	2010–11	2010–11	12	602	93	28.66	0	5	1	1/4	74.00	0	0	7	0	
25	Michael Chinouya	Zimbabwe	2010–11	2010–11	7	21	8	3.00	0	0	13	3/42	45.38	0	0	3	0	
26	Sikandar Raza	Zimbabwe (Note: Raza was born in Pakistan, but has played all of his representative cricket in Zimbabwe)	2010–11	2010–11	10	626	146	41.73	1	4	3	2/5	59.66	0	0	7	0	
27	Bruce Tembo	Zimbabwe	2010–11	2010–11	1	5	5	5.00	0	0	0	0/34	–	0	0	0	0	
28	Samuel Mwakayeni	Zimbabwe	2010–11	2010–11	4	77	45	11.00	0	0	0	0/11	–	0	0	2	0	
29	Roy Kaia	Zimbabwe	2010–11	2010–11	4	280	112	40.00	1	2	1	1/30	35.00	0	0	2	0	
30	Elton Chigumbura	Zimbabwe	2010–11	2010–11	2	14	7*	7.00	0	0	–	–	–	–	–	2	0	

== Captains ==
Name	Nationality	First	Last	P	W	L	D	T	N/R	W%
Chamu Chibhabha	Zimbabwe	2009–10	2009–10	3	0	2	1	0	0	0.00
Steve Tikolo	Kenya	2009–10	2010–11	11	0	4	7	0	0	0.00
Alester Maregwede	Zimbabwe	2009–10	2009–10	3	0	2	1	0	0	0.00
Stuart Matsikenyeri	Zimbabwe	2010–11	2010–11	7	0	1	6	0	0	0.00
Tatenda Taibu	Zimbabwe	2010–11	2010–11	1	0	0	1	0	0	0.00
Total		2009–10	2010–11	25	0	9	16	0	0	0.00
