= 2010–11 Logan Cup =

- Administrator: Zimbabwe Cricket
- Cricket format: First-class cricket (4 days)
- Tournament format(s): League system and Final
- Champions: Matabeleland Tuskers (1st title)
- Participants: 5
- Matches: 31
- Most runs: 852 – Hamilton Masakadza (Mountaineers)
- Most wickets: 55 – Tendai Chatara (Mountaineers)

The 2010–11 Logan Cup was a first-class cricket competition held in Zimbabwe from 6 September 2010 to 3 April 2011. The tournament was won by the Matabeleland Tuskers, who defeated the Mountaineers by 18 runs in the final.

During the group stage of the competition, the Mountaineers remained unbeaten in their twelve matches, and the batting and bowling tables were both led by Mountaineers players. Hamilton Masakadza was the competition's leading run-scorer, accruing 852 runs, while Tendai Chatara took more wickets than any other player, claiming 55 in total. The Southern Rocks and the previous season's champions, the Mashonaland Eagles, both suffered poor campaigns, and failed to win a single match during the tournament.

== Points table ==
Team	Pld	W	L	D	T	A	Pts
Mountaineers	12	7	0	5	0	0	48
Matabeleland Tuskers	12	4	2	5	0	1	32
Mid West Rhinos	12	4	2	5	0	1	29
Mashonaland Eagles	12	0	6	6	0	0	5
Southern Rocks	12	0	5	7	0	0	3
Source:ESPNcricinfo

== Final ==
In the final, the Matabeleland Tuskers were missing five of their key players, including their four most prolific batsmen. In contrast, the group stage leaders, the Mountaineers, had their full squad to choose from. The Tuskers won the toss and opted to bat first. They reached a first innings score of 195, a total propped up by good batting from the tail-end batsman, accompanied by a score of 54 by opening batsman Mbekezeli Mabuza. In the Mountaineers reply, Hamilton Masakadza scored a century, described by ESPNcricinfo as "one of his greatest first-class innings", but no other batsman passed 40 runs, in an inning controlled by the bowling of Keegan Meth. Meth claimed six wickets, and bowled more economically than any of his team-mates. At the end of the first innings, the Mountaineers had a 45 run lead. The Tuskers batting was stronger in the second innings: nine of the eleven batsmen reached double figure scores, and both Bradley Staddon and Meth achieved half-centuries. They were eventually dismissed for 290, setting the Mountaineers a total of 247 runs to win the tournament. Meth improved on his first innings haul, and claimed seven wickets during the Mountaineers second innings. His efforts ensured that the Matabeleland Tuskers won the match by 18 runs, despite half-centuries by Bernard Mlambo and Timycen Maruma.

30 March – 2 April 2011
Scorecard

Matabeleland Tuskers	v	Mountaineers
195 (68.2 overs); Mbekezeli Mabuza 54 (130); Natsai M'shangwe 3/44 (13.2 overs)		239 (67.2 overs); Hamilton Masakadza 119 (206); Keegan Meth 6/40 (19.2 overs)
290 (103.3 overs); Keegan Meth 65 (100); Prosper Utseya 2/37 (24 overs)		228 (63 overs); Bernard Mlambo 68 (77); Keegan Meth 7/69 (23 overs)

Matabeleland Tuskers won by 18 runs
Mutare Sports Club, Mutare
Umpires: Owen Chirombe and Russell Tiffin
Player of the match: Keegan Meth

- Matabeleland Tuskers won the toss and elected to bat.
