= 2025–26 Pro50 Championship =

Cricket tournament

- Dates: 31 October 2025 – 11 April 2026
- Administrator: Zimbabwe Cricket
- Cricket format: List A
- Tournament format: Double round-robin
- Host: Zimbabwe
- Champions: Southern Rocks (2nd title)
- Participants: 5
- Matches: 21
- Most runs: Innocent Kaia (500)
- Most wickets: Jalat Khan (22)

The 2025–26 Pro50 Championship was the 23rd edition of the Pro50 Championship, a List A cricket tournament that was played in Zimbabwe. It started on 31 October 2025, and the final was held on 11 April 2026.

The Mountaineers were the defending champions. Southern Rocks won their second title by defeating defending champion Mountaineers in the final by 8 wickets.

Venues that held at least one game.

== Points table ==
Pos	Team	Pld	W	L	NR	Pts	NRR	Qualification
1	Southern Rocks	8	6	2	0	12	1.054	Advance to final
2	Mountaineers	8	5	2	1	11	0.445	Advance to final
3	Mashonaland Eagles	8	4	4	0	8	0.185	
4	Matabeleland Tuskers	8	2	4	2	6	−1.304	
5	Mid West Rhinos	8	1	6	1	3	−0.652	

Source: ESPNcricinfo

=== League progression ===
Team	Group matches								Play-offs
Team	1	2	3	4	5	6	7	8	Final
Mountaineers	1	1	1	3	5	7	9	11	L
Mid West Rhinos	0	0	1	1	3	3	3	3	—
Mashonaland Eagles	2	4	6	6	6	6	6	8	—
Matabeleland Tuskers	0	1	1	2	2	2	4	6	—
Southern Rocks	2	4	6	8	10	12	12	12	W

Win	Loss	Tie	No result	Eliminated

- Note: The total points at the end of each group match are listed.
- Note: Click on the points or results to see the match summary.

== Fixtures ==
=== Round 1 ===
Match 1
31 October 2025
09:30
Scorecard

Mid West Rhinos; 262 (44.4 overs)	v	Mashonaland Eagles; 263/8 (49.1 overs)
Tarisai Musakanda 107 (85); Tanaka Chivanga 3/41 (7 overs)		Marshal Takodza 72 (75); Hendrichs Macheke 2/48 (8 overs)

Mashonaland Eagles won by 2 wickets
Kwekwe Sports Club, Kwekwe
Umpires: Stanley Gogwe and David Shawane
Player of the match: Marshall Takodza (Mashonaland Eagles)

- Eagles won the toss and elected to field.
- Wishnanzy Chapfombo and Kundai Matigimu (Mashonaland Eagles) both made their List A debuts.
- Tarisai Musakanda (Mid West Rhinos) scored his maiden century in List A cricket.

Match 2
31 October 2025
09:30
Scorecard

Southern Rocks; 256/8 (50 overs)	v	Matabeleland Tuskers; 168 (38.2 overs)
Innocent Kaia 71 (77); Nkosana Mpofu 2/33 (8 overs)		Munashe Chimusoro 51 (76); Newman Nyamhuri 4/15 (6.2 overs)

Southern Rocks won by 88 runs
Queens Sports Club, Bulawayo
Umpires: Christopher Phiri and Justice Tapfumaneyi
Player of the match: Newman Nyamhuri (Southern Rocks)

- Tuskers won the toss and elected to field.
- Derrick Sadoki (Southern Rocks) and Munashe Chimusoro (Matabeleland Tuskers) both made their List A debuts.

=== Round 2 ===
Match 3
11 November 2025
09:30
Scorecard

Matabeleland Tuskers; 227 (49.5 overs)	v	Mountaineers; 52/3 (16 overs)
Brian Chari 47 (79); Definate Mawadzi 2/35 (6 overs)		Timycen Maruma 22* (29); Tawanda Maposa 3/12 (5 overs)

No result
Queens Sports Club, Bulawayo
Umpires: Langton Rusere and Collin Tlou

- Mountaineers won the toss and elected to field.
- Rain prevented any further play.
- Ronak Patel (Mountaineers) made his List A debut.

Match 4
11 November 2025
09:30
Scorecard

Mid West Rhinos; 139 (37 overs)	v	Southern Rocks; 143/6 (30.2 overs)
Takudzwanashe Kaitano 56 (79); Matthew Campbell 4/3 (3 overs)		Johnathan Campbell 48* (81); Antum Naqvi 4/52 (10 overs)

Southern Rocks won by 4 wickets
Kwekwe Sports Club, Kwekwe
Umpires: Iknow Chabi and Dylan Ziyambi
Player of the match: Matthew Campbell (Southern Rocks)

- Rhinos won the toss and elected to bat.
- Arinesto Vezha (Southern Rocks) made his List A debut.

=== Round 3 ===
Match 5
22 November 2025
09:30
Scorecard

Mountaineers; 181 (44.1 overs)	v	Southern Rocks; 184/4 (34.2 overs)
Mathew Welch 29 (28); Jalat Khan 3/27 (9.1 overs)		Ashley Mufandauya 62 (81); Vincent Masekesa 1/33 (4 overs)

Southern Rocks won by 6 wickets
Mutare Sports Club, Mutare
Umpires: Forster Mutizwa and David Shawane
Player of the match: Jalat Khan (Southern Rocks)

- Southern Rocks won the toss and elected to field.
- Muhammad Sheraz (Mountaineers) made his List A debut.

Match 6
22 November 2025
09:30
Scorecard

Matabeleland Tuskers; 158 (40.2 overs)	v	Mashonaland Eagles; 161/1 (23.1 overs)
Munashe Chimusoro 52 (69); Tanaka Chivanga 3/28 (7.2 overs)		Kudzai Maunze 53* (47); Ali Khan 1/15 (4 overs)

Mashonaland Eagles won by 9 wickets
Harare Sports Club, Harare
Umpires: Tafadzwa Musakwa and Percival Sizara
Player of the match: Tanaka Chivanga (Mashonaland Eagles)

- Eagles won the toss and elected to field.
- Kashif Afridi, Ali Hasnain (Mashonaland Eagles), Ali Khan and Muslim Khan (Matabeleland Tuskers) all made their List A debuts.

=== Round 4 ===
Match 7
3 December 2025
09:30
Scorecard

Mountaineers; 166 (39.5 overs)	v	Mashonaland Eagles; 167/5 (32.4 overs)
Timycen Maruma 60 (85); Faraz Akram 4/27 (9 overs)		Kudzai Maunze 60* (70); Tendai Chatara 2/21 (5 overs)

Mashonaland Eagles won by 5 wickets
Harare Sports Club, Harare
Umpires: Tafadzwa Muzarawetu and Langton Rusere
Player of the match: Faraz Akram (Mashonaland Eagles)

- Mashonaland Eagles won the toss and elected to field.
- Calton Takawira (Mountaineers) made his List A debut.

Match 8
1 December 2025
09:30
Scorecard

Mid West Rhinos; 227 (48.1 overs)	v	Matabeleland Tuskers; 49/3 (9 overs)
Ben Curran 88 (109); Ali Khan 2/28 (6 overs)		Brian Chari 21* (18); Hendrichs Macheke 2/14 (4 overs)

No result
Queens Sports Club, Bulawayo
Umpires: Forster Mutizwa and Nkosehle Ndiweni

- Matabeleland Tuskers won the toss and elected to field.
- No further play was possible due to rain.
- Maaz Khan and Muhammad Khwaja (Mid West Rhinos) both made their List A debuts.

=== Round 5 ===
Match 9
8 February 2026
09:30
Scorecard

Mountaineers; 206 (47.5 overs)	v	Mid West Rhinos; 197 (43.2 overs)
Alistair Frost 55 (70); Victor Chirwa 4/28 (10 overs)		Tarisai Musakanda 65 (92); Vincent Masekesa 5/42 (9.2 overs)

Mountaineers won by 9 runs
Kwekwe Sports Club, Kwekwe
Umpires: Stanley Gogwe and Christopher Phiri
Player of the match: Vincent Masekesa (Mountaineers)

- Mid West Rhinos won the toss and elected to field.
- Shafi Ullah (Mountaineers) made his List A debut.
- Vincent Masekesa (Mountaineers) took his maiden five-wicket haul in List A cricket.

Match 10
8 February 2026
09:30
Scorecard

Mashonaland Eagles; 203 (41.1 overs)	v	Southern Rocks; 205/3 (36.2 overs)
Kundai Matigimu 41 (36); Jalat Khan 3/32 (7.1 overs)		Panashe Taruvinga 62* (86); Rodney Mupfudza 2/36 (8 overs)

Southern Rocks won by 7 wickets
Masvingo Sports Club, Masvingo
Umpires: Ashby Mutumbami and Percival Sizara
Player of the match: Matthew Campbell (Southern Rocks)

- Southern Rocks won the toss and elected to field.

=== Round 6 ===
Match 11
19 February 2026
09:30
Scorecard

Mid West Rhinos; 292/6 (50 overs)	v	Mashonaland Eagles; 246 (49.2 overs)
Takudzwanashe Kaitano 124 (131); Tanaka Chivanga 2/37 (8 overs)		Faraz Akram 91 (105); Michael Chinouya 3/17 (7 overs)

Mid West Rhinos won by 46 runs
Harare Sports Club, Harare
Umpires: Stanley Gadzikwa and Forster Mutizwa
Player of the match: Takudzwanashe Kaitano (Mid West Rhinos)

- Mashonaland Eagles won the toss and elected to field.
- Ryan Simbi (Mashonaland Eagles) made his List A debut.

Match 12
19 February 2026
09:30
Scorecard

Matabeleland Tuskers; 228 (46.5 overs)	v	Southern Rocks; 177/0
Hamid Ali 91 (103); Newman Nyamhuri 4/30 (7.5 overs)		Innocent Kaia 104* (89)

Southern Rocks won by 10 wickets (DLS method)
Queens Sports Club, Bulawayo
Umpires: Iknow Chabi and Nkosehle Ndiweni
Player of the match: Innocent Kaia (Southern Rocks)

- Matabeleland Tuskers won the toss and elected to bat.
- Southern Rocks were set a revised target of 175 runs from 28 overs due to rain.

=== Round 7 ===
Match 13
2 March 2026
09:30
Scorecard

Mountaineers; 231/8 (50 overs)	v	Matabeleland Tuskers; 62 (16.4 overs)
Mike Frost 45* (49); Ernest Masuku 2/36 (9 overs)		Hamid Ali 18 (28); Tendai Chatara 5/31 (7 overs)

Mountaineers won by 169 runs
Bulawayo Athletic Club, Bulawayo
Umpires: Christopher Phiri and Langton Rusere
Player of the match: Tendai Chatara (Mountaineers)

- Matabeleland Tuskers won the toss and elected to field.

Match 14
2 March 2026
09:30
Scorecard

Southern Rocks; 255 (50 overs)	v	Mid West Rhinos; 122 (23.5 overs)
Innocent Kaia 103 (115); Hendrichs Macheke 3/52 (9 overs)		Maaz Khan 34 (43); Jalat Khan 7/44 (8.5 overs)

Southern Rocks won by 133 runs
Old Hararians, Harare
Umpires: Iknow Chabi and David Shawane
Player of the match: Jalat Khan (Southern Rocks)

- Terrence Makoroma (Mid West Rhinos) made his List A debut.
- Jalat Khan (Southern Rocks) took his maiden five-wicket haul in List A cricket.

=== Round 8 ===
Match 15
13 March 2026
09:30
Scorecard

Mountaineers; 199 (46 overs)	v	Southern Rocks; 122 (29.1 overs)
Ronak Patel 57 (102); Jalat Khan 6/30 (9 overs)		Innocent Kaia 46 (51); Mike Frost 6/12 (6.1 overs)

Mountaineers won by 77 runs
Takashinga Cricket Club, Harare
Umpires: Percival Sizara and Oscar Tafirenyika
Player of the match: Mike Frost (Mountaineers)

- Mountaineers won the toss and elected to bat.
- Nathaniel Hlabangana (Southern Rocks) made his List A debut.

Match 16
13 March 2026
09:30
Scorecard

Matabeleland Tuskers; 216 (46.2 overs)	v	Mashonaland Eagles; 187 (46.3 overs)
Tawanda Maposa 62 (58); Wessly Madhevere 5/36 (10 overs)		Wessly Madhevere 41 (48); Mgcini Dube 3/32 (8.3 overs)

Matabeleland Tuskers won by 29 runs
Queens Sports Club, Bulawayo
Umpires: Forster Mutizwa and Christopher Phiri
Player of the match: Mgcini Dube (Matabeleland Tuskers)

- Matabeleland Tuskers won the toss and elected to bat.
- Wessly Madhevere (Mashonaland Eagles) took his maiden five-wicket haul in List A cricket.

=== Round 9 ===
Match 17
24 March 2026
09:30
Scorecard

Mashonaland Eagles; 249/9 (50 overs)	v	Mountaineers; 251/3 (46 overs)
Tinashe Kamunhukamwe 65 (82); Prosper Mugeri 2/44 (8 overs)		Brian Bennett 143* (133); Tony Munyonga 1/10 (3 overs)

Mountaineers won by 7 wickets
Harare Sports Club, Harare
Umpires: Panashe Marovatsanga and Langton Rusere
Player of the match: Brian Bennett (Mountaineers)

- Mountaineers won the toss and elected to field.

Match 18
24 March 2026
09:30
Scorecard

Matabeleland Tuskers; 268 (49.5 overs)	v	Mid West Rhinos; 252 (48.4 overs)
Luke Jongwe 61* (51); Zaman Khawaja 3/41 (8.5 overs)		Ryan Burl 106 (102); Ainsley Ndlovu 3/29 (10 overs)

Matabeleland Tuskers won by 16 runs
Queens Sports Club, Bulawayo
Umpires: Iknow Chabi and Collin Tlou
Player of the match: Ainsley Ndlovu (Matabeleland Tuskers)

- Matabeleland Tuskers won the toss and elected to bat.
- Zaman Khawaja (Mid West Rhinos) made his List A debut.

=== Round 10 ===
Match 19
4 April 2026
09:30
Scorecard

Mountaineers; 232 (44.3 overs)	v	Mid West Rhinos; 221 (45.3 overs)
Ronak Patel 72 (77); Brad Evans 2/32 (8.3 overs)		Nyasha Mayavo 58 (62); Michael Frost 4/44 (10 overs)

Mountaineers won by 11 runs
Takashinga Cricket Club, Harare
Umpires: Tafadzwa Musakwa and David Shawane
Player of the match: Michael Frost (Mountaineers)

- Mountaineers won the toss and elected to bat.
- Tatenda Chimugoro (Mountaineers) and Ollard Dzinokuvara (Mid West Rhinos) both made their List A debut.

Match 20
4 April 2026
09:30
Scorecard

Southern Rocks; 273/7 (50 overs)	v	Mashonaland Eagles; 274/8 (48.2 overs)
Panashe Taruvinga 95 (100); Kundai Matigimu 3/57 (10 overs)		Rodney Mupfudza 60 (81); Roy Kaia 2/17 (3.2 overs)

Mashonaland Eagles won by 2 wickets
Harare Sports Club, Harare
Umpires: Forster Mutizwa and Langton Rusere
Player of the match: Kundai Matigimu (Mashonaland Eagles)

- Southern Rocks won the toss and elected to bat.
- Tashinga Makoni (Mashonaland Eagles), Phase Mukabeta and Samuel Muyambo (Southern Rocks) all made their List A debuts.

== Final ==
Final
11 April 2026
09:30
Scorecard

Mountaineers; 230 (49.2 overs)	v	Southern Rocks; 231/2 (40.4 overs)
Joylord Gumbie 51 (110); Shelton Mazvitorera 3/31 (6.2 overs)		Innocent Kaia 112* (113); Alistair Frost 1/30 (4.4 overs)

Southern Rocks won by 8 wickets
Masvingo Sports Club, Masvingo
Umpires: Iknow Chabi and Langton Rusere
Player of the match: Matthew Campbell (Southern Rocks)

- Southern Rocks won the toss and elected to field.
