= 2009–10 Faithwear Metbank One-Day Competition =

- Administrator(s): Zimbabwe Cricket
- Cricket format: List A
- Tournament format(s): Group stage and knockout
- Champions: Mountaineers (1st title)
- Participants: 5
- Matches: 23
- Most runs: 317 – Tino Mawoyo (Mountaineers)
- Most wickets: 12 – Natsai Mushangwe (Mountaineers)

The 2009–10 Faithwear Metbank One-Day Competition was a List A cricket competition held in Zimbabwe from 19 September 2009 – 10 April 2010. It was the first edition of the tournament held after a reorganization of Zimbabwean cricket, and saw the previous five teams replaced with five franchises: Mashonaland Eagles, Matabeleland Tuskers, Mid West Rhinos, Mountaineers and Southern Rocks.

It was won by the Mountaineers, who defeated the Mid West Rhinos in the final by three wickets.

== Fixtures and results ==
=== Group stage ===
Pos	Team	Pld	W	L	T	NR	Pts	NRR
1	Mountaineers	8	6	1	0	1	26	0.781
2	Mid West Rhinos	8	5	3	0	0	20	0.073
3	Mashonaland Eagles	8	3	3	0	2	16	−0.021
4	Southern Rocks	8	3	4	0	1	14	−0.293
5	Matabeleland Tuskers	8	1	7	0	0	4	−0.487

Source: Cricinfo

=== Knockout stage ===
Semi-finals
7 April – Kwekwe
Mashonaland Eagles	221/9 (50 ov)
Mid West Rhinos	222/8 (46.3 ov)
7 April – Harare
Southern Rocks	131 (39.5 ov)
Mountaineers	134/3 (19.5 ov)

Final
10 April – Harare
Mid West Rhinos	144 (35.5 ov)
Mountaineers	149/7 (37.5 ov)

==== Semi-finals ====
7 April
16:00
Scorecard

Mashonaland Eagles (Zimbabwe); 221/9 (50 overs)	v	(Zimbabwe) Mid West Rhinos; 222/8 (46.3 overs)
Regis Chakabva 62 (52); Michael Chinouya 3/20 (5 overs)		Riki Wessels 70 (94); Elton Chigumbura 2/42 (7 overs)

Mid West Rhinos won by 2 wickets
Kwekwe Sports Club, Kwekwe
Umpires: Lucky Ngwenya and Justice Tapfumaneyi

- Mid West Rhinos, who chose to field

7 April
16:00
Scorecard

Southern Rocks (Zimbabwe); 131 (39.5 overs)	v	(Zimbabwe) Mountaineers; 134/3 (19.5 overs)
Steve Tikolo 37 (79); Shingirai Masakadza 3/20 (6 overs)		Hamilton Masakadza 44 (24); Hilary Matanga 2/33 (5 overs)

Mountaineers won by 7 wickets
Mutare Sports Club, Mutare
Umpires: Jeremiah Matibiri and Langton Rusere

- Mountaineers, who chose to field

==== Final ====
10 April
16:00
Scorecard

Mid West Rhinos (Zimbabwe); 144 (35.5 overs)	v	(Zimbabwe) Mountaineers; 149/7 (37.5 overs)
Bothwell Chapungu 27 (36); Prosper Utseya 3/24 (8.5 overs)		Shingirai Masakadza 41* (68); Ed Rainsford 4/48 (10 overs)

Mountaineers won by 3 wickets
Mutare Sports Club, Mutare
Umpires: Jeremiah Matibiri and Justice Tapfumaneyi
Player of the match: Shingirai Masakadza (Mountaineers) and Prosper Utseya (Mountaineers)

- Mountaineers, who chose to field
- Mountaineers won the 2009/10 Faithwear Metbank One-Day Competition
