= 2010–11 Metbank Pro40 Championship =

2010–11 Pro50 Championship
- Dates: 11 September 2010 – 27 March 2011
- Administrator: Zimbabwe Cricket
- Cricket format: List A cricket
- Tournament format(s): Round-robin and knockout
- Champions: Southern Rocks (1st title)
- Participants: 5
- Matches: 23
- Most runs: Jonathan Beukes (301)
- Most wickets: Natsai M'shangwe (13)

The 2010–11 Metbank Pro40 Championship was the ninth edition of the List A cricket tournament in Zimbabwe. In previous, and following, years the competition was a 50-over tournament, but this edition was played in a 40-over format. The competition began on 11 September 2010 and the final was played on 27 March 2011.

The first semi-final was won by the Southern Rocks who dismissed the Matabeleland Tuskers for just 94, with Brian Vitori leading the way with a five-wicket haul. The second semi-final saw the Mid West Rhinos eliminate the defending champions Mountaineers. After the Rhinos compiled a moderate total of 200/6 with Malcolm Waller scoring a 54 and a late fightback by the tail which saw Solomon Mire compile 45*, Mountaineers were dismissed for only 84, with spinner Graeme Cremer taking 4/13.

Southern Rocks won the tournament for the first time, comfortably defeating the Mid West Rhinos by 8 wickets in the final.

Mountaineers South African batsman Jonathan Beukes was the tournament's leading run-scorer with a total of 301 runs. Mountaineers bowler Natsai M'shangwe was the leading wicket-tacker with a total of 13 wickets.

== Points table ==
Pos	Team	Pld	W	L	T	NR	BP	Pts	NRR
1	Mountaineers	8	5	2	0	1	2	24	0.861
2	Matabeleland Tuskers	8	3	2	0	3	0	18	−0.413
3	Southern Rocks	8	3	3	0	2	0	16	0.145
4	Mid West Rhinos	8	2	3	0	3	0	14	−0.454
5	Mashonaland Eagles	8	2	5	0	1	0	10	−0.408

Source: Cricinfo

Qualified for the knockout stages

== Knockout stage ==
Semi-finals
25 March – Harare
Mid West Rhinos	200/6 (40 ov)
Mountaineers	84 (25 ov)
26 March – Harare
Matabeleland Tuskers	94 (31.1 ov)
Southern Rocks	97/1 (20.3 ov)

Final
27 March – Harare
Mid West Rhinos	151 (36.4 ov)
Southern Rocks	155/2 (34.5 ov)

=== Semi-finals ===
25 March
16:00
Scorecard

Mid West Rhinos; 200/6 (40 overs)	v	Mountaineers; 84 (25 overs)
Malcolm Waller 54 (64); Shingirai Masakadza 2/17 (5 overs)		Kevin Kasuza 30 (49); Graeme Cremer 4/13 (7 overs)

Mid West Rhinos won by 116 runs
Harare Sports Club, Harare
Umpires: Ian Robinson and Langton Rusere

- Mountaineers, who chose to field

26 March
16:00
Scorecard

Matabeleland Tuskers; 94 (31.1 overs)	v	Southern Rocks; 97/1 (20.3 overs)
Bradley Staddon 25 (50); Brian Vitori 5/26 (7.1 overs)		Chamu Chibhabha 45* (56); Christopher Mpofu 1/23 (6 overs)

Southern Rocks won by 9 wickets
Harare Sports Club, Harare
Umpires: Owen Chirombe and Trevor Phiri

- Matabeleland Tuskers, who chose to bat

=== Final ===
27 March
16:00
Scorecard

Mid West Rhinos (Zimbabwe); 151 (36.4 overs)	v	(Zimbabwe) Southern Rocks; 155/2 (34.5 overs)
Malcolm Waller 68 (82); Tafadzwa Kamungozi 3/35 (8 overs)		Sikandar Raza 44 (72); Malcolm Waller 1/14 (2 overs)

Southern Rocks won by 8 wickets
Harare Sports Club, Harare
Umpires: Jeremiah Matibiri and Russell Tiffin

- Southern Rocks, who chose to field
- Southern Rocks won the 2010/11 Metbank Pro40 Championship
