= Pro50 Championship =

Zimbabwean cricket tournament

- Countries: Zimbabwe
- Administrator: Zimbabwe Cricket
- Format: List A
- First edition: 2002-03
- Latest edition: 2025–26
- Tournament format: Round-robin and knockout
- Current champion: Southern Rocks (2nd title)
- Most successful: Mashonaland Eagles (6 titles)
- Website: Zimbabwe Cricket
- 2026–27 Pro50 Championship

The Pro50 Championship, formerly known as the Faithwear Metbank One-Day Competition, Metbank Pro40 Championship, Faithwear Inter-Provincial Tournament, and Coca-Cola Metbank Pro50 Championship is the premier List A cricket tournament in Zimbabwe, organized by Zimbabwe Cricket. This tournament was started after the Zimbabwean cricket crisis, recommended by the International Cricket Council (ICC). It is jointly sponsored by Metbank and Coca-Cola.

== Teams ==
- Mashonaland Eagles
- Matabeleland Tuskers
- Mid West Rhinos
- Mountaineers
- Southern Rocks (2009–2014) and (2021–)

=== Former teams ===
==== 2002-06 seasons ====
- Manicaland
- Mashonaland
- Masvingo
- Matabeleland
- Midlands
- Namibia (2004–2005)

==== 2007-09 seasons ====
- Centrals
- Easterns
- Northerns
- Southerns
- Westerns

==== Franchise era teams ====
- Rising Stars (2017–2018)

== Champions ==
This table lists all the champions of the Pro50 Championship.

Season	Winner (number of titles)	Runners-up	Leading run-scorer (club)	Runs	Leading wicket-taker (club)	Wickets
2002–03	Mashonaland (1)	Matabeleland	Andy Flower (Mashonaland)	482	Mluleki Nkala (Matabeleland)	13
2003–04	Mashonaland (2)	Midlands	Piet Rinke (Manicaland)	269	Blessing Mahwire (Manicaland); Waddington Mwayenga (Mashonaland)	13
2004–05	Matabeleland (1)	Namibia	Mark Vermeulen (Matabeleland)	271	Christopher Mpofu (Matabeleland); Innocent Chinyoka (Midlands)	11
2005–06	Matabeleland (2)	Masvingo	Elton Chigumbura (Manicaland)	116	Christopher Mpofu (Matabeleland); Tapiwa Kuhkengisa (Mashonaland)	9
2006–07	Easterns (1)	Northerns	Solomon Mire (Centrals)	230	Graeme Cremer (Northerns)	10
2007–08	Easterns (2)	Centrals	Stuart Matsikenyeri (Easterns)	147	Shingirai Masakadza (Easterns); Graeme Cremer (Northerns)	9
2008–09	Easterns (3)	Westerns	Charles Coventry (Westerns)	251	Ray Price (cricketer) (Northerns)	9
2009–10	Mountaineers (1)	Mid West Rhinos	Tino Mawoyo (Mid West Rhinos)	317	Natsai Mushangwe (Mountaineers)	12
2010–11	Southern Rocks (1)	Mid West Rhinos	Jonathan Beukes (Mountaineers)	301	Natsai Mushangwe (Mountaineers)	13
2011–12	Mashonaland Eagles (1)	Mid West Rhinos	Gary Ballance (Rhinos)	432	Tendai Chatara (Mountaineers)	17
2012–13	Mashonaland Eagles (2)	Matabeleland Tuskers	Vusi Sibanda (Rhinos)	437	Christopher Mpofu (Tuskers); Glen Querl (Tuskers)	14
2013–14	Mountaineers (2)	Southern Rocks	Hamilton Masakadza (Mountaineers)	260	Donald Tiripano (Mountaineers); Tawanda Mupariwa (Tuskers)	13
2014–15	Mashonaland Eagles (3)	Matabeleland Tuskers	Roy Kaia (Mountaineers)	382	Christopher Mpofu (Tuskers)	19
2015–16	Mashonaland Eagles (4)	Mountaineers	Prince Masvaure (Rhinos)	250	Tawanda Mupariwa (Tuskers)	13
2016–17	Matabeleland Tuskers (1)	Mid West Rhinos	Malcolm Waller (Mountaineers)	402	Brian Vitori (Tuskers)	20
2017–18	Rising Stars (1)	Mountaineers	Tinashe Kamunhukamwe (Stars)	379	Natsai Mushangwe (Mountaineers)	17
2018–19	Mashonaland Eagles (5)	Matabeleland Tuskers	Craig Ervine (Tuskers)	422	Daniel Jakiel (Mountaineers)	13
2019–20	Zimbabwe Cricket voided the tournament due to the COVID-19 pandemic with no winner being declared.					
2020–21	Mid West Rhinos (1)	Southern Rocks	Takudzwanashe Kaitano (Rhinos)	247	John Nyumbu (Tuskers)	11
2021–22	Mountaineers (3)	Southern Rocks	Ben Compton (Mountaineers)	361	Sean Williams (Matabeleland Tuskers)	15
2022–23	Mountaineers (4)	Mid West Rhinos	Tadiwanashe Marumani (Mashonaland Eagles)	428	Brandon Mavuta (Mid West Rhinos)	28
2023–24	Mashonaland Eagles (6)	Mid West Rhinos	Antum Naqvi (Mid West Rhinos)	514	Tapiwa Mufudza (Mashonaland Eagles)	18
2024–25	Mountaineers (5)	Mid West Rhinos	Antum Naqvi (Mid West Rhinos)	413	Victor Nyauchi (Mountaineers)	15
2025–26	Southern Rocks (2)	Mountaineers	Innocent Kaia (Southern Rocks)	500	Jalat Khan (Southern Rocks)	22

== Tournaments ==
Before the reorganization of cricket in Zimbabwe, this tournament was known as the Faithwear Inter-Clothing Tournament or Faithwear Inter-Provincial One-Day Series.

=== 2002/03 season ===
- Champions: Mashonaland
- Runners-up: Manicaland
- Official Website: 2002/03 Faithwear Inter-Provincial Series on ESPNCricinfo

Four teams participated in this inaugural tournament (before the Zimbabwean cricket crisis). They included Mashonaland, Manicaland, Matabeleland and Midlands. Star players like Andy Flower, Grant Flower, Guy Whittall, Mluleki Nkala, Craig Wishart, Henry Olonga, Heath Streak, Stuart Carlisle, Craig Wishart, Sean Ervine and Brian Murphy took part in this tournament.

Mashonaland won the tournament, defeating Midlands chasing a target over 300. It was quite unsurprising considering that the Mashonaland team had both the Flower brothers on their side. When Midlands batted first, Craig Wishart led the way with 121. He got valuable support from the top order that included Terry Duffin, Travis Friend and Dougie Marillier. After Wishart's departure Sean Ervine hit a lightning unbeaten fifty that took the score to an imposing 300/5. Midlands began their fielding display well, dismissing both openers with the score at 31, but no match is won unless the Flower brothers are dismissed. Both the brothers struck centuries at better than a run-a-ball, in an unbroken partnership of 279 runs. So dominant were they that they still had 28 balls spare when the winning runs were scored. With Manicaland losing in Bulawayo, Mashonaland were crowned the inaugural Faithwear One-Day Series champions, winning five of their matches, against three each by Matabeleland and Manicaland.

Andy Flower was the highest run scorer with 482 runs at an average of 160.66, while Mluleki Nkala was the highest wicket-taker with 13 scalps.

=== 2003/04 season ===
- Champions: Mashonaland
- Runners-up: Midlands
- Official Website: 2003/04 Faithwear Inter-Provincial One-Day Series on ESPNCricinfo

Mashonaland successfully retained their title in this tournament, coasting to victory by six wickets against Midlands in the final. Midlands had a steady opening partnership only to see a middle-order collapse and were bowled out for 168. Mashonaland coasted to the victory with Elton Chigumbura scoring 49*.

Piet Rinke top-scored in the tournament with 269 runs, while Blessing Mahwire was the top wicket-taker with 13 wickets.

Mashonaland had also finished first in their group.

=== 2004/05 season ===
- Champions: Matabeleland
- Runners-up: Namibia
- Official Website: 2004/05 Faithwear Inter-Provincial One-Day Series on ESPNCricinfo

For this season, Namibia was added to the number of participating teams. They immediately made an impression, finishing runners-up finishing behind only champions Matabeleland. Matabeleland easily was the strongest team in the tournament, and the team particularly weakened was Mashonaland who finished bottom of the group league, as they were coupled by the loss of the Flower brothers, after the player walkout of 2004.

Matabeleland won the tournament after their fourth successive victory against Midlands by 58 runs. After Sean Williams's 61 ensured they reached 222, Midlands were bowled out for 164, with Keith Dabengwa taking 4-20. On the other hand, a shell-shocked Mashonaland side who had finished bottom of the league, called back 2004 rebels Trevor Gripper and Neil Ferreira who had performed well in club cricket (although it is unclear whether Zimbabwe Cricket approved their selection). Both Gripper and Ferreira led Mashonaland to victory, with Gripper scoring 71 and Ferreira 45. They beat Manicaland by 14 runs, but it was nothing more than just a consolation.

Particularly, Matabeleland's Mark Vermeulen had 271 runs at an impressive average of 90.33 and a top score of 105. Christopher Mpofu also rose to prominence by being the top wicket-taker with 11 wickets.

=== 2005/06 season ===
- Champions: Matabeleland
- Runners-up: Masvingo
- Official Website: 2005/06 Faithwear Inter-Provincial One-Day Series on ESPNCricinfo

This was the last tournament played with the traditional teams, with Masvingo being an additional team now. Masvingo repeated Namibia's newcomer success the previous season by finishing at the same second place behind champions Matabeleland. Matabeleland once again retained the title they won the previous season. Mashonaland's performances were better than it was last year, finishing in fourth place, but it was no where near the peaks it once ruled.

In the series decider between Matabeleland and Masvingo, the Matabeles retained the title at a canter, crushing their opponents by eight wickets. Masvingo never recovered from the early heap of wickets and only Robertson Chinyengetere (34) built any substantial innings as Tawanda Mupariwa (3/29) and Greg Strydom (4/20) did most of the damage. The Matabeles were given a solid start by Terry Duffin (20) and Tinashe Hove (56*) as Matabeleland romped to the win with more than 23 overs spare. The result meant that they won all the four matches they played.

Elton Chigumbura was the top run-scorer with 116 runs from 2 games, while Christopher Mpofu was once again the leading wicket-taker with 9 wickets from 4 matches.

After the Zimbabwean cricket season of 2005/06, Cricinfo reporter Steven Price wrote an article describing the season detail-by-detail.

After the Faithwear Cup was over, John Ward wrote on Cricinfo an article named "A brief history of Zimbabwe cricket". Here, he ended the article by saying that,"The 2005-06 Logan Cup never took place after a disastrous Faithwear Trophy when sides were so feeble as to be embarrassing. ZC revamped the system, removed Mashonaland and Matabeleland (two of the leading opponents of the Chingoka regime) and unveiled a new competition for 2006-07."

=== 2006-07 season ===
- Champions: Easterns
- Runner-up: Northerns
- Official Website: 2006/07 Faithwear Clothing Inter-Provincial Tournament at Cricinfo

The Faithwear series went without any glitches in 2007, with the Mashonaland selection issues having been, for the most part, buried. While the quality of cricket wasn't all that high, there were some close contests, such as Centrals last ball win over Westerns, thanks to Solomon Mire's 79 not out, and Westerns 2 run victory over Southerns. But there were also some absolute drubbings, with the class of Easterns too much for Southerns, who lost with 117 balls remaining, and Westerns 88 run win, bowling Northerns out for just 133.

For 50 over matches, Zimbabwe Cricket would have been disappointed that the average score was in the low 200's. Centrals 8/263 from 43 overs, thanks to a 94 run slog from Solomon Mire – who smashed 5 sixes and 7 fours in his 67 balls – was the highest score of the competition.

However, the countries top cricketers were involved in the ICC World Cup in the West Indies, leaving the second tier – such as Tino Mawoyo, Graeme Cremer and Timycen Maruma – with more responsibility than they could handle. The absence of the big name players would have almost certainly been behind the series of low scores throughout the tournament.

=== 2007/08 season ===
- Champions: Easterns
- Runner-up: Centrals
- Official Website: 2007/09 Faithwear Clothing Inter-Provincial Tournament at Cricinfo

The Faithwear series ran successfully after many delays which saw the series postponed several months. Unfortunately, the quality of cricket was not all that high, with teams still struggling to score well.

For the second year running, Zimbabwe Cricket would have been disappointed that the average score in these 50 over matches was just over 140.

The only decent scores of the series came from Centrals and Easterns. Centrals scored 6/237 in their loss to Easterns, with Easterns scoring 2/197, thinks to Timycen Maruma's 83, from 31 overs due to Duckworth-Lewis.

Easterns also brought their A game to the "final". The final match of the series was between Northerns and Easterns, who both on equal number of wins, were essentially playing for the title. Easterns scored 9/249, the highest total of the series, which was too much for Northerns who struggled, scoring just 157.

After the end of the tournament, Steven Price reported on Cricinfo about the state of cricket in Zimbabwe, where top Zimbabwean cricketers have resorted to black market hustling to survive.

=== 2008/09 season ===
- Champions: Easterns
- Runner-up: Westerns
- Official Website: 2008/09 Faithwear Clothing Inter-Provincial One-Day Tournament at Cricinfo

It was the Faithwear series that kicked off the official domestic cricket season in Zimbabwe for 2008–09. This season saw the exclusion of Southerns, the feeling being that reducing the domestic competitions to 4 teams would increase the quality of cricket being played as a result of greater competition for squad places. This turned out to be very accurate with some very promising performances.

Centrals, who gained many of Southerns former players, became a much more competitive team, posting 3 scores over 200; Easterns, Northerns and Westerns only reached 200 twice. Despite this, Centrals won the wooden spoon. It was Easterns who continued their domestic dominance with 5 wins from their 6 matches (the other match was abandoned), winning the Faithwear cup.

The big news from this series was Mark Vermeulen's return to cricket. After burning down the Zimbabwe Cricket Academy in late 2006 his cricket career appeared to be over. But after being granted a second chance by Zimbabwe Cricket, he made his comeback in the 2008-09 Faithwear series.

Many players missed the beginning of the tournament due to the Zimbabwe A tour of Namibia and South Africa.

The following tournaments happened after the reorganization of Zimbabwean cricket:

=== 2009/10 season ===
- Winner: Mountaineers

=== 2010/11 season ===
- Winners: Southern Rocks

=== 2011/12 season ===
- Winners: Mashonaland Eagles

=== 2012/13 season ===
- Winners: Mashonaland Eagles

=== 2013/14 season ===
- Winners: Mountaineers

=== 2014/15 season ===
- Winners: Mashonaland Eagles

=== 2015/16 season ===
- Winners: Mashonaland Eagles

=== 2016/17 season ===
- Winners: Matabeleland Tuskers

=== 2017/18 season ===
- Winners: Rising Stars

=== 2018/19 season ===
- Winners : Mashonaland Eagles

=== 2019/20 season ===
- Winners : Zimbabwe Cricket voided the tournament due to the COVID-19 pandemic with no winner being declared.

=== 2020/21 season ===
- Winners : Mid West Rhinos

=== 2021/22 season ===
- Winners : Mountaineers

=== 2022/23 season ===
- Winners : Mountaineers

=== 2023/24 season ===
- Winners : Mashonaland Eagles
- Runner-up: Mid West Rhinos

== Notes ==
- Coca-Cola also is a development sponsor of Zimbabwe Cricket.
