= 2013–14 Logan Cup =

- Administrator: Zimbabwe Cricket
- Cricket format: First-class cricket (4 days)
- Tournament format: League system
- Champions: Mountaineers (1st title)
- Participants: 5
- Matches: 18
- Most runs: 588 – Regis Chakabva (Mashonaland Eagles)
- Most wickets: 34 – Donald Tiripano (Mountaineers)

The 2013–14 Logan Cup was a first-class cricket competition held in Zimbabwe from 9 December 2013 to 26 April 2014. The tournament was won by the Mountaineers, who claimed their first title.

Regis Chakabva of the Mashonaland Eagles finished the competition as the leading run-scorer, accumulating 588 runs. The leading wicket-taker was Donald Tiripano of the Mountaineers, who took 34 wickets.

The season was disrupted after the first round of matches, due to a player boycott following non-payment of salaries. The second round of matches, which were due to be played between 17 and 20 December 2013, was ultimately cancelled. The tournament resumed on 24 February 2014.

== Points table ==
| Team | Pld | W | L | D | T | A | Pts |
|---|---|---|---|---|---|---|---|
| Mountaineers | 7 | 6 | 0 | 1 | 0 | 0 | 43 |
| Mashonaland Eagles | 7 | 4 | 2 | 1 | 0 | 0 | 31 |
| Matabeleland Tuskers | 7 | 3 | 3 | 1 | 0 | 0 | 24 |
| Mid West Rhinos | 8 | 2 | 5 | 1 | 0 | 0 | 16 |
| Southern Rocks | 7 | 0 | 5 | 2 | 0 | 0 | 5 |
Source:ESPNcricinfo
