= 2011–12 Pro50 Championship =

- Dates: 24 September 2011 – 25 February 2012
- Administrator: Zimbabwe Cricket
- Cricket format: List A cricket
- Tournament format: Round-robin + Final
- Champions: Mashonaland Eagles (1st title)
- Participants: 5
- Matches: 21
- Most runs: Gary Ballance (432)
- Most wickets: Tendai Chatara (17)

The 2011–12 Pro50 Championship was the tenth edition of the Pro50 Championship, a List A cricket tournament in Zimbabwe. After a 40-over tournament in 2010/11, the tournament was again increased to a 50-overs a side format. The new sponsor of the tournament was cold drinks brand Coca-Cola. The competition began on 24 September 2011 and the final was played on 25 February 2012.

Mashonaland Eagles won the tournament for the first time, defeating the Mid West Rhinos by 63 runs in the final. Elton Chigumbura's all-round performance was the key for the Eagles, scoring an unbeaten 104 runs and then taking three wickets for 27 runs in nine overs.

Mid West Rhinos batsman Gary Ballance was the tournament's leading run-scorer with a total of 432 runs. Mountaineers bowler Tendai Chatara was the leading wicket-tacker with a total of 17 wickets.

== Points table ==
Pos	Team	Pld	W	L	T	NR	BP	Pts	NRR
1	Mashonaland Eagles	8	6	2	0	0	4	28	1.027
2	Mid West Rhinos	8	5	2	1	0	2	24	0.390
3	Matabeleland Tuskers	8	3	5	0	0	2	14	0.018
4	Southern Rocks	8	3	4	1	0	0	14	−0.478
5	Mountaineers	8	2	6	0	0	2	10	−0.758

Source: Cricinfo

Champions

== Final ==
25 February
Scorecard

Mashonaland Eagles; 220/8 (50 overs)	v	Mid West Rhinos; 157 (42.1 overs)
Elton Chigumbura 104* (115); Ed Rainsford 3/56 (12 overs)		Graeme Cremer 47 (60); Elton Chigumbura 3/27 (9 overs)

Mashonaland Eagles won by 63 runs
Harare Sports Club, Harare
Umpires: Russell Tiffin and Owen Chirombe

- Mid West Rhinos won the toss and elected to field
- Mashonaland Eagles won the 2011/12 Pro50 Championship
