= 2009–10 Logan Cup =

- Administrator: Zimbabwe Cricket
- Cricket format: First-class cricket (4 days)
- Tournament format(s): League system and Final
- Champions: Mashonaland Eagles (1st title)
- Participants: 5
- Matches: 31
- Most runs: 1,287 – Vusi Sibanda (Mid West Rhinos)
- Most wickets: 59 – Graeme Cremer (Mid West Rhinos)

The 2009–10 Logan Cup was a first-class cricket competition held in Zimbabwe from 14 September 2009 – 3 April 2010. It was won by the Mashonaland Eagles, who won due to finishing top of the table during the league stage of the competition, after drawing the final against the Mid West Rhinos.

The tournament was the first contesting of the Logan Cup to be played following a restructure of Zimbabwean cricket that resulted in five franchises, the Mashonaland Eagles, Matabeleland Tuskers, Mid West Rhinos, Mountaineers and Southern Rocks. The competition was originally scheduled to start in late August, but was delayed by three weeks as a number of the franchises had not completed signing players by that stage. The competition, and Zimbabwe Cricket in particular, received criticism from the executive editor of Cricinfo, Martin Williamson, as "scorecards have been almost impossible to find and reports have been brief." Despite this criticism, the competition was praised for the improved quality of the cricket, due in part to the presence of Zimbabwe's international players.

The Mashonaland Eagles topped the group stage of the tournament, winning six of their twelve matches. They faced the league runners-up, the Mid West Rhinos, in the final. The Rhinos team included the competition's leading run-scorer, Vusi Sibanda, who accumulated 1,287 runs at an average of 61.28, and the leading wicket-taker, Graeme Cremer, who claimed 59 wickets with an average of 28.27. The final was drawn, despite a fourth innings collapse by the Eagles, who ended their innings on 67 for 5. As a result of the draw, the Eagles won the competition by virtue of topping the table.

== Points table ==
| Team | Pld | W | L | D | T | Bat | Bwl | Pts | Net R/R |
|---|---|---|---|---|---|---|---|---|---|
| Mashonaland Eagles | 12 | 6 | 1 | 5 | 0 | 38 | 40 | 168 | +0.390 |
| Mid West Rhinos | 12 | 4 | 1 | 7 | 0 | 28 | 35 | 145 | +0.094 |
| Matabeleland Tuskers | 12 | 3 | 3 | 6 | 0 | 31 | 46 | 143 | +0.135 |
| Mountaineers | 12 | 3 | 5 | 4 | 0 | 34 | 39 | 127 | +0.220 |
| Southern Rocks | 12 | 0 | 6 | 6 | 0 | 19 | 35 | 90 | –0.912 |
Source:CricketArchive

== Final ==
30 March – 3 April 2010
Scorecard

| Mid West Rhinos | v | Mashonaland Eagles |
| 364 (118.2 overs); Brendan Taylor 131 (155); Prince Masvaure 3/49 (11 overs) | | 451 (168.1 overs); Greg Lamb 159 (352); Ed Rainsford 6/66 (32 overs) |
| 335/6d (112.3 overs); Riki Wessels 108* (180); Ryan Butterworth 2/26 (7 overs) | | 67/5 (40 overs); Forster Mutizwa 18* (102); Graeme Cremer 3/20 (17 overs) |

Match drawn
Harare Sports Club, Harare
Umpires: Owen Chirombe and Jeremiah Matibiri

- Mashonaland Eagles won the toss and elected to field.
