= Shepherd Makunura =

Zimbabwean cricket player and coach (1976–2022)

Personal information
- Full name: Shepherd Tichaendepi Makunura
- Born: 23 October 1976; Salisbury, Rhodesia
- Died: 15 December 2022 (aged 46); Harare, Zimbabwe
- Batting: Right-handed
- Bowling: Right-arm off break
- Relatives: Sinikiwe Mpofu (wife)

Domestic team information
- Years: Team
- 2001/02: Mashonaland A
- 2006/07: Northerns

Career statistics
Competition	First-class
Matches	5
Runs scored	189
Batting average	27.00
100s/50s	0/1
Top score	62
Balls bowled	108
Wickets	2
Bowling average	33.00
5 wickets in innings	0
10 wickets in match	0
Best bowling	1/20
Catches/stumpings	4/–
- Source: ESPNcricinfo, 18 December 2022

Shepherd Tichaendepi Makunura (23 October 1976 – 15 December 2022) was a Zimbabwean cricket player and coach. He played two Logan Cup seasons before retiring due to injury. He served as fielding coach of the Zimbabwe national cricket team and also coached Zimbabwe A, Zimbabwe Under-19s and several domestic teams.

== Early life ==
Makunura was born in Salisbury (now Harare) on 23 October 1976. He attended Chengu Primary School in Highfield and then attended Prince Edward School on a scholarship.

== Playing career ==
Makunura was a right-handed batsman and right-arm off break bowler. His talent was identified by a Zimbabwe Cricket Union development program for urban areas and he made the national under-15 squad, as well as joining the Takashinga Cricket Club. He played three matches for Mashonaland A in the 2001–02 Logan Cup, recording a career-best 62 runs against Midlands. He returned to first-class cricket in the 2006–07 season with two matches for Northerns against Southerns and Kenya Select. His playing career was cut short by an achilles tendon injury in 2007.

== Coaching career ==
Makunura coached the Zimbabwe national under-19 cricket team from 2008 to 2010. He was head coach of Zimbabwe A for series against Canada and Kenya in 2018, and also coached the Zimbabwe XI at the 2018 Africa T20 Cup in South Africa. In the same year he joined the Zimbabwe national cricket team as fielding coach, a position he held until his death in 2022.

In domestic cricket, Makunura led the Mountaineers franchise to three consecutive Logan Cup titles from 2017 to 2019. He then won a record fourth consecutive title with the Southern Rocks in 2020.

== Personal life and death ==
Makunura had two children with his wife Sinikiwe Mpofu, who played for the Zimbabwe women's national cricket team.

Makunura died at the West End Hospital in Harare on 15 December 2022, following a long illness that had prevented him from travelling to the 2022 ICC Men's T20 World Cup in Australia. He was buried at the Warren Hills Cemetery in Harare. Hardly a month after Makunura's passing, his wife, Sinikiwe Mpofu also died after collapsing at her home.
