= 2015–16 Logan Cup =

- Administrator: Zimbabwe Cricket
- Cricket format: First-class cricket (4 days)
- Tournament format: League system
- Champions: Mashonaland Eagles (2nd title)
- Participants: 4
- Matches: 12
- Most runs: 477 – Craig Ervine (Matabeleland Tuskers)
- Most wickets: 25 – Shingirai Masakadza (Mountaineers)

The 2015–16 Logan Cup was a first-class cricket competition held in Zimbabwe from 25 November 2014 to 5 March 2015. The tournament was won by the Mashonaland Eagles, who claimed their second title.

Craig Ervine of the Matabeleland Tuskers finished the competition as the leading run-scorer, accumulating 477 runs. The leading wicket-taker was Shingirai Masakadza of the Mountaineers, with 25 wickets.

== Points table ==
Team	Pld	W	L	D	T	A	Pts
Mashonaland Eagles	6	4	2	0	0	0	26
Matabeleland Tuskers	6	3	3	0	0	0	24
Mid West Rhinos	6	3	3	0	0	0	21
Mountaineers	6	2	4	0	0	0	13
Source:ESPNcricinfo
