= Chinyengetere =

Chinyengetere is a Zimbabwean surname. Notable people with the surname include:

- Robertson Chinyengetere, a Zimbabwean cricketer
- Rodwell Chinyengetere, a Zimbabwean footballer
