= Steven Nyamuzinga =

Zimbabwean cricketer (born 1986)

Personal information
- Born: 30 November 1986 (age 39); Marondera, Zimbabwe
- Source: ESPNcricinfo, 3 October 2016

Steven Nyamuzinga (born 30 November 1986) is a Zimbabwean first-class cricketer who plays for Mountaineers cricket team.
