= Mbekezeli Mabuza =

Zimbabwean cricketer (born 1985)

Personal information
- Full name: Mbekezeli Mark Mabuza
- Born: 6 January 1985 (age 41); Bulawayo, Zimbabwe
- Batting: Right handed
- Bowling: Right-arm medium; Right-arm off break

Domestic team information
- Years: Team
- 2003/04–2004/05: Matabeleland
- 2006/07–2008/09: Westerns
- 2009/10–2016/17: Matabeleland Tuskers

Career statistics
| Competition | FC | LA | T20 |
|---|---|---|---|
| Matches | 33 | 28 | 14 |
| Runs scored | 895 | 516 | 138 |
| Batting average | 15.70 | 24.57 | 11.50 |
| 100s/50s | 1/2 | 0/2 | 0/0 |
| Top score | 106 | 87 | 42 |
| Balls bowled | 1133 | 645 | 84 |
| Wickets | 17 | 18 | 7 |
| Bowling average | 39.05 | 32.27 | 15.57 |
| 5 wickets in innings | 1 | 0 | 1 |
| 10 wickets in match | 0 | 0 | 0 |
| Best bowling | 5/36 | 3/22 | 5/14 |
| Catches/stumpings | 29/– | 12/– | 6/– |
- Source: ESPNCricinfo, 29 January 2019

Mbekezeli Mabuza (born 6 January 1985) is a Zimbabwean cricketer.

Mabuza has played domestic cricket in Zimbabwe for the Bulawayo-based Matabeleland, Westerns and Matabeleland Tuskers, and has also represented Zimbabwe A. Mabuza made his First class debut for Matabeleland on 19 March 2004 in a Logan Cup match against Manicaland. He played his first List A match for Matabeleland on 9 November 2004 against Mashonaland, and his first Twenty20 match on 19 March 2008 for Westerns against Easterns.

In April 2009, Mabuza scored his maiden First class century for Westerns in a Logan Cup defeat against Easterns. In May 2009, he took a match-winning 5-wicket haul for Westerns in the final of Zimbabwe's domestic Twenty20 competition against Northerns.

Mabuza and fellow Westerns player Simba Kusano were involved in a car crash in August 2009. Mabuza suffered a back injury, while Kusano suffered a broken leg and did not play any further top level cricket.

In October 2010, Mabuza starred with both bat and ball in a MetBank Pro40 Championship victory for the Tuskers against the Southern Rocks. He scored an unbeaten 46, sharing a century partnership with English wicket-keeper Adam Wheater, before bowling the final over to deny the Southern Rocks victory.
