= Bernard Mlambo =

Zimbabwean cricketer (born 1985)

Personal information
- Born: 2 December 1985 (age 40); Harare, Zimbabwe
- Source: ESPNcricinfo, 3 October 2016

Bernard Mlambo (born 2 December 1985) is a Zimbabwean former first-class cricketer who played for Mountaineers cricket team.
