= Jalat Khan (cricketer, born 1999) =

Pakistani cricketer

Personal information
- Born: 17 February 1999 (age 27); Layyah, Punjab, Pakistan
- Batting: Left-handed
- Bowling: Left-arm fast

Domestic team information
- Years: Team
- 2023/24–present: Southern Rocks
- 2026: Pindiz

Career statistics
| Competition | FC | LA | T20 |
|---|---|---|---|
| Matches | 12 | 8 | 14 |
| Runs scored | 56 | 21 | 19 |
| Batting average | 5.09 | 7.00 | 19.00 |
| 100s/50s | 0/0 | 0/0 | 0/0 |
| Top score | 21 | 11* | 14 |
| Balls bowled | 1,866 | 369 | 282 |
| Wickets | 58 | 26 | 25 |
| Bowling average | 19.32 | 11.23 | 12.04 |
| 5 wickets in innings | 2 | 2 | 0 |
| 10 wickets in match | 0 | – | – |
| Best bowling | 6/70 | 7/44 | 4/19 |
| Catches/stumpings | 3/– | 1/– | 3/– |
- Source: Cricinfo, 11 March 2026

Jalat Khan (born 17 February 1999) is a Pakistani cricketer who plays mostly in Zimbabwe. Playing for Southern Rocks in the Zimbabwean first-class Logan Cup tournament in December 2023, he took four wickets in four deliveries.

== Cricket career ==
A left-arm fast bowler from Layyah in Punjab province, Khan received coaching in the Lahore Qalandars Players Development Program in 2022. He played for Lahore Qalandars in the 20-over Namibia Global T20 in September 2023, and began playing in Zimbabwe shortly afterwards.

In December 2023, against Matabeleland Tuskers in the second round of the Logan Cup, Khan took 5 for 14 as Southern Rocks dismissed Tuskers in their second innings for 71. He took wickets with the last two balls of his fourth over and two more with the first two balls of his fifth; three of the four were out leg before wicket. It was the 45th time in the history of first-class cricket that a bowler has taken four wickets in four balls. Later the same season he took 3 for 53 and 6 for 70 in Rocks' victory over Mid West Rhinos; he made all his dismissals without the aid of a fielder: five leg before wicket, three bowled, one caught and bowled.

In Zimbabwe's Pro50 Championship domestic List A competition, Khan took 7 for 44 against Mid West Rhinos in March 2026. Southern Rocks won by 133 runs. With 28 wickets at an average of 13.96, Khan was the leading wicket-taker in the 2025–26 Logan Cup, which Southern Rocks won.
