= Keith Kulinga =

Zimbabwean cricketer (born 1979)

Personal information
- Born: 14 April 1979 (age 47); Harare, Zimbabwe
- Source: ESPNcricinfo, 22 February 2017

Keith Kulinga (born 14 April 1979) is a Zimbabwean cricketer. He played four first-class matches for Southern Rocks between 2009 and 2011.
