= Keith Kondo =

Zimbabwean cricketer (born 1988)

Personal information
- Full name: Keith Kondo
- Born: 5 November 1988 (age 38); Harare, Zimbabwe
- Batting: Right-handed
- Bowling: Right-arm medium
- Role: All-rounder

Domestic team information
- Years: Team
- 2006: Mashonaland
- 2008/09: Northerns
- 2009: Southern Rocks

Career statistics
Competition	First-class	List A
Matches	6	6
Runs scored	78	82
Batting average	8.66	16.40
100s/50s	0/0	0/1
Top score	30	58
Balls bowled	–	120
Wickets	–	5
Bowling average	–	17.80
5 wickets in innings	–	0
10 wickets in match	–	0
Best bowling	–	3/15
Catches/stumpings	3/–	1/–
- Source: CricketArchive, 5 August 2011

Keith Kondo (born 5 November 1988) is a Zimbabwean cricketer.

== Career ==
Kondo made his List A debut for Mashonaland against Matabeleland in the 2005–06 Inter-Provincial One-Day Competition, scoring seven runs batting at #7. He played three further games for Mashonaland in the 2005–06 season, including a bowling analysis of 3/15 against Midlands.

Kondo made his first-class debut for Northerns in 2008 after the reorganisation of Zimbabwean cricket, making 30 and 8 runs after opening the batting in both innings. He played four further first-class matches for Northerns in the 2007–08 and 2008–09, mainly as an opener, as well as two List A matches.

Kondo represented Southern Rocks in one first-class match against Mountaineers in September 2009 after Zimbabwean cricket was once again reorganised, scoring a duck in the first innings and 11 in the second innings. This remains his last first-class match to date, although he did appear in six matches for Southern Rocks B in the 2009–10 Franchise B League, scoring 301 runs at an average of 33.44, with a highest score of 86.
