= Sinikiwe Mpofu =

Zimbabwean cricketer (1985–2023)

Personal information
- Full name: Sinikiwe Gava Mpofu
- Born: 21 February 1985; Bulawayo, Zimbabwe
- Died: 7 January 2023 (aged 37); Masvingo, Zimbabwe
- Batting: Right-handed
- Bowling: Right-arm medium
- Relatives: Shepherd Makunura (husband)

International information
- National side: Zimbabwe (2006–2011)

Head coaching information
- Years: Team
- ?–2021: Mountaineers
- 2021–2022: Southerns
- Source: Cricinfo, 21 November 2017

Sinikiwe Gava Mpofu (21 February 1985 – 7 January 2023) was a Zimbabwean cricket player and coach. She represented the Zimbabwe women's national cricket team at two editions of the Women's Cricket World Cup Qualifier. She later coached Mountaineers and Southerns in Zimbabwean domestic cricket.

== Early life ==
Mpofu was born on 21 February 1985 in Bulawayo, Zimbabwe. She grew up in the suburb of Njube, attending Mtshede Primary School and Mpopoma High School.

== Playing career ==
Mpofu appeared in the Zimbabwe women's national cricket team's first official international in 2006, playing alongside her high school classmate Thandolwenkosi Mlilo. She was an all-rounder batting right-handed and bowling right-arm medium pace. She began her domestic career with Bulawayo-based Westerns, but relocated to Harare in 2007 to study journalism, and moved to Northerns, also joining the Takashinga Cricket Club.

Mpofu represented Zimbabwe at the 2008 Women's Cricket World Cup Qualifier in South Africa and the 2011 Women's Cricket World Cup Qualifier in Bangladesh.

== Coaching career ==
Mpofu was the first female Zimbabwean cricketer to transition to coaching. She coached Zimbabwean women's team Mountaineers. During her tenure, Mountaineers won the 2020–21 Fifty50 Challenge. In 2021, she was named head coach of the Southerns women's team. She was part of the national team's technical staff at the 2022 ICC Women's T20 World Cup Qualifier in the United Arab Emirates, under head coach Gary Brent. She was also due to accompany the women's national under-19 team to the 2023 Under-19 Women's Cricket World Cup in South Africa, but took compassionate leave following her husband's death.

== Personal life and death ==
Mpofu had two children with her husband Shepherd Makunura, a professional cricket coach, who died in December 2022 following a long illness. She died on 7 January 2023 at the age of 37, less than a month after her husband's death. She reportedly collapsed at her home in Masvingo and was pronounced dead on arrival at hospital.
