= Tendai Machiri =

Zimbabwean cricketer (born 1985)

Personal information
- Born: 2 April 1985 (age 41); Harare, Zimbabwe
- Source: ESPNcricinfo, 22 February 2017

Tendai Machiri (born 2 April 1985) is a Zimbabwean cricketer. He made his first-class debut for Southerns in the 2006–07 Logan Cup on 26 April 2007.
