= Samuel Mwakayeni =

Zimbabwean cricketer (born 1988)

Personal information
- Born: 17 August 1988 (age 38); Harare, Zimbabwe
- Source: ESPNcricinfo, 22 February 2017

Samuel Mwakayeni (born 17 August 1988) is a Zimbabwean cricketer. He made his first-class debut for Northerns in the 2006–07 Logan Cup on 12 April 2007.
