= Kudakwashe Macheka =

Zimbabwean cricketer (born 2000)

Personal information
- Born: 25 September 2000 (age 26)
- Batting: Right-handed
- Bowling: Right arm fast medium
Medal record
Representing Zimbabwe
Men's Cricket
African Games
Gold medal – first place	2023 Accra	Team
- Source: Cricinfo, 7 December 2024

Kudakwashe Macheka (born 25 September 2000) is a Zimbabwean cricketer.

== Career ==
He made his first-class debut for Rangers against Mid West Rhinos on 27 December 2019 during the 2019–20 Logan Cup. He made his List A debut for Rangers against Matabeleland Tuskers on 5 February 2020 during the 2019–20 Pro50 Championship. He made his T20 debut for Mid West Rhinos against Southern Rocks on 25 March 2022 during the 2022–23 Zimbabwe Domestic Twenty20 Competition.

In March 2024, he was included in Zimbabwe's contingent for the 2023 African Games and he represented Zimbabwe Emerging Team in the men's cricket tournament at the 2023 African Games. Zimbabwe eventually claimed gold medal in the African Games cricket tournament defeating Namibia by 8 wickets in the final. In August 2024, he featured in Zimbabwe Emerging Team for their home series against South Africa which consisted of two first-class matches and three List A matches.
