= Rodney Mupfudza =

Zimbabwean cricketer (born 2001)

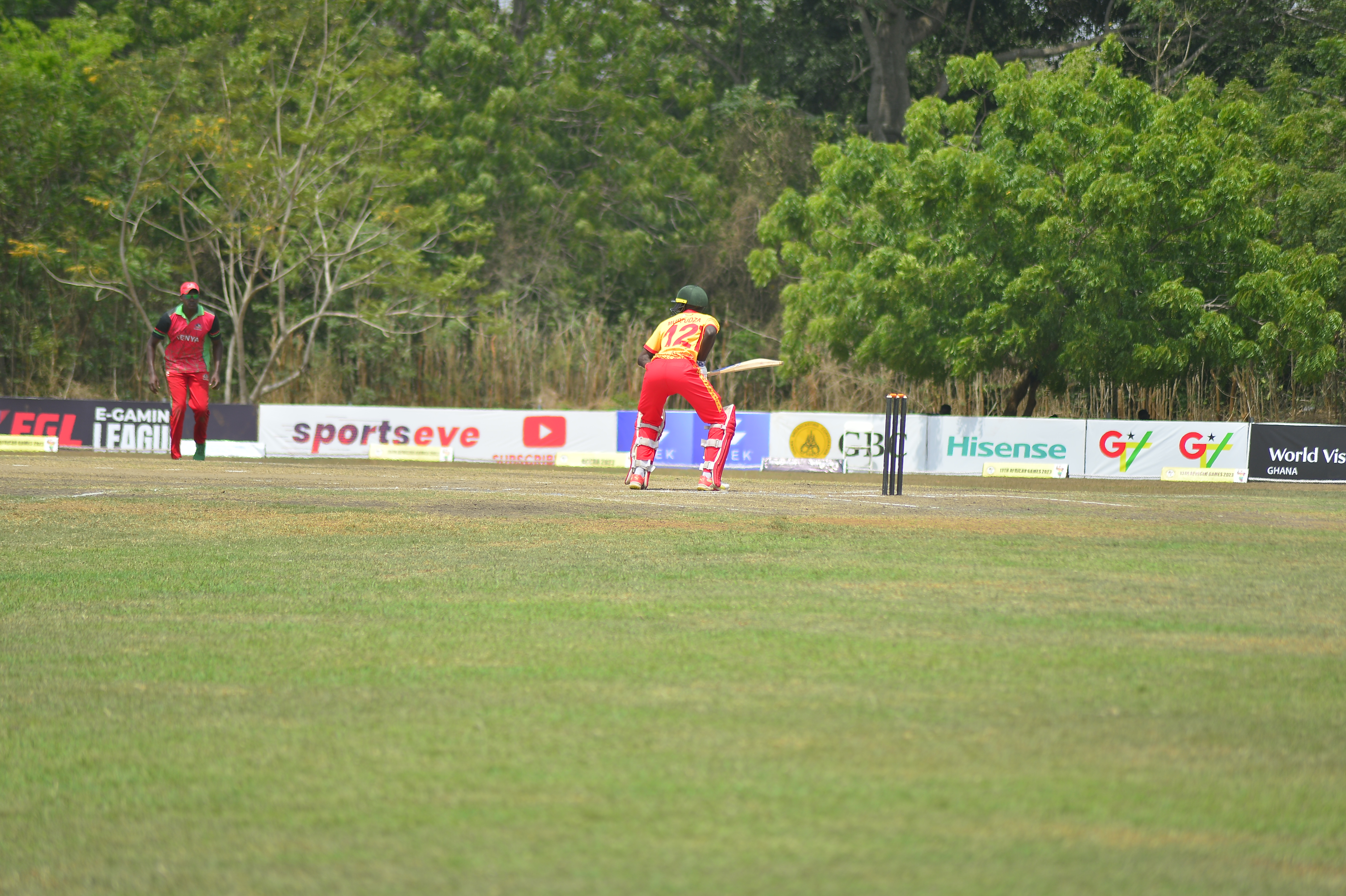

Personal information
- Born: 12 August 2001 (age 25); Harare, Zimbabwe
- Batting: Right-handed
- Bowling: Legbreak

Domestic team information
- Years: Team
- 2020-present: Mashonaland Eagles
Medal record
Representing Zimbabwe
Men's Cricket
African Games
Gold medal – first place	2023 Accra	Team
- Source: Cricinfo, 6 December 2024

Rodney Mupfudza (born 12 August 2001) is a Zimbabwean cricketer.

== Career ==
Mupfudza made his first-class debut for Mashonaland Eagles against Matabeleland Tuskers on 26 February 2020 during the 2019–20 Logan Cup. He made his T20 debut for Mashonaland Eagles against Matabeleland Tuskers on 16 April 2021 during the final of the 2020–21 Zimbabwe Domestic Twenty20 Competition. He made his List A debut for Mashonaland Eagles against Mid West Rhinos on 18 April 2021 during the 2020–21 Pro50 Championship.

In March 2024, Mupfudza was included in Zimbabwe's contingent for the 2023 African Games and he represented Zimbabwe Emerging Team in the men's cricket tournament at the 2023 African Games. Zimbabwe eventually claimed the gold medal in the African Games cricket tournament, defeating Namibia by 8 wickets in the final.
