= Hilary Matanga =

Zimbabwean cricketer (born 1984)

Personal information
- Born: 9 July 1984 (age 42); Marondera, Zimbabwe
- Batting: Left-handed
- Source: ESPNcricinfo

Hilary Matanga (born 9 July 1984) is a Zimbabwean first-class cricketer.
