= Tino Mawoyo =

Zimbabwean cricketer (born 1986)

Personal information
- Full name: Tinotenda Mbiri Kanayi Mawoyo
- Born: 8 January 1986 (age 40); Mutare, Zimbabwe
- Batting: Right-handed
- Bowling: Right-arm medium-fast
- Role: Batter

International information
- National side: Zimbabwe
- Test debut (cap 77): 4 August 2011 v Bangladesh
- Last Test: 6 November 2013 v Sri Lanka
- ODI debut (cap 97): 8 December 2006 v Bangladesh
- Last ODI: 31 August 2014 v Australia

Career statistics
Competition	Test	ODI	FC	LA
Matches	11	7	114	81
Runs scored	615	58	5,324	1,974
Batting average	29.28	8.28	27.72	28.20
100s/50s	1/3	0/0	4/27	1/14
Top score	163*	15	163*	120*
Balls bowled	–	–	72	–
Wickets	–	–	2	–
Bowling average	–	–	22.00	–
5 wickets in innings	–	–	0	–
10 wickets in match	–	–	0	–
Best bowling	–	–	1/0	–
Catches/stumpings	7/–	2/–	95/–	27/1
- Source: Cricinfo, 10 November 2016

Tinotenda Mbiri Kanayi Mawoyo (born 8 January 1986) is a Zimbabwean cricket commentator and former cricketer. He formerly played for the Mountaineers in the Zimbabwean Domestic Competition. He began his commentary career as an occasional cricket commentator in the domestic cricket matches which were held in Zimbabwe and in other cricket series including the Sri Lankan cricket team's tour to Bangladesh in 2017-18 after being dropped out from the national team.

== Domestic career ==
Mawoyo led the Zimbabwean Under-19 cricket team in six Under-19 One Day Internationals in 2003/4 and the U-19 World Cup the same season.

Mawoyo led Zimbabwe during the 2003–2004 U-19 World cup. He was not in form, averaging just 20 with a highest score of 32 not out. He was called up for a Zimbabwe A match against Bangladesh in 2006. He made his ODI debut against Bangladesh the same year. He scored just 10 and 14, so He was not included in the Zimbabwean World Cup Squad the next year.

Mawoyo was once appointed Zimbabwe A captain but was stripped of captaincy following inappropriate behaviour by the team which was at Bulawayo camp. He still remained a good batsman in Zimbabwe, being the Highest Run Scorer in the Metbank one-day competition with 424 runs averaging 60.57.

He now plays club cricket in England as an overseas player for Wickford Cricket Club in Essex.

== International career ==
He made his ODI debut against Bangladesh in 2006. In spite of being a strong domestic player, He was dropped as he did not show enough potential on his first two matches. He made his Test debut against Bangladesh on 4 August 2011. He has been known for his 163* against Pakistan in a lone test match on 2 September 2011.

Mawoyo made his test debut against Bangladesh on 4 August 2011. He scored 43 & 35 on debut. On 2 September at Bulawayo, Mawoyo carried his bat through the innings in the only Test against Pakistan, scoring an unbeaten 163. He was the third Zimbabwean batsman to do so in a Test innings, after Mark Dekker in 1993 and Grant Flower in 1998. All three men achieved the feat in Tests against Pakistan.

He returned to ODIs in 2013, scoring a slow 9(26b,0x4,0x6). In the first test, he scored 50(95,7x4) and 9(18b,2x4). In the second test, he scored 8(30b,1x4) and 0(2b).

== Education ==
Mawoyo attended Hillcrest College.
