= Robertson Chinyengetere =

Zimbabwean cricketer (born 1982)

Personal information
- Born: 30 June 1982 (age 44); Masvingo, Zimbabwe
- Source: ESPNcricinfo, 22 February 2017

Robertson Chinyengetere (born 30 June 1982) is a Zimbabwean cricketer. He made his first-class debut for Zimbabwe A on 17 June 2006.
