= Masvingo Sports Club =

Cricket ground

The Masvingo Sports Club is a cricket venue with first-class status in Masvingo, the capital of Masvingo Province. It was the home ground to one of Zimbabwe's provincial cricket sides, Southern Rocks, until the team's disbandment after the 2013–14 season. The ground has hosted several first class, List A and Twenty20 matches.

In 2012–13 at the Masvingo Sports Club, Mountaineers dismissed Southern Rocks for 58, leaving themselves a target of 64 for victory, but Southern Rocks in turn dismissed Mountaineers for 26 to win by 37 runs. Two players share the ground record score of 217: Brendan Taylor scored 217 for Mid West Rhinos against Southern Rocks in 2009–10, and Dan Housego scored 217 not out for Mountaineers against Southern Rocks in 2013–14.
