= Roy Kaia =

Zimbabwean cricketer (born 1991)

Personal information
- Born: 10 October 1991 (age 35); Chegutu, Zimbabwe
- Batting: Right-handed
- Bowling: Right-arm off break
- Role: All-rounder

International information
- National side: Zimbabwe (2015–2021)
- Test debut (cap 115): 29 April 2021 v Pakistan
- Last Test: 7 July 2021 v Bangladesh
- Only ODI (cap 125): 31 May 2015 v Pakistan

Career statistics
Competition	Test	ODI	FC	LA
Matches	3	1	97	91
Runs scored	59	0	4,366	2,270
Batting average	9.83	–	27.98	28.73
100s/50s	0/0	0/0	4/28	2/12
Top score	48	–	133	113
Balls bowled	180	0	7,226	2,494
Wickets	0	0	108	85
Bowling average	–	–	35.98	22.78
5 wickets in innings	0	0	7	0
10 wickets in match	0	–	1	–
Best bowling	–	–	7/58	4/22
Catches/stumpings	1/0	0/0	44/0	26/0
- Source: ESPNcricinfo, 12 April 2025

Roy Kaia (born 10 October 1991) is a Zimbabwean cricketer. He plays first-class cricket for Mountaineers. He made his international debut for the Zimbabwe cricket team in May 2015.

== Domestic career ==
Kaia was part of the 2010 Zimbabwe U19 team that lost to the South Africa U19 team in a youth ODI . He took 4 wickets for 49. He was also on the losing side against the same opponents a few months later in 2011, scoring 60 not out off 56 balls in a T20 match. Kaia played first-class cricket for Southern Rocks and is currently part of Mountaineers team.

He has the most Pro50 Championship List A runs in the season leading the second-placed player by more than 100 runs with an average score of 76.40 in nine games, also taking 6 wickets at an economy of 4.79.

In December 2020, he was selected to play for the Southern Rocks in the 2020–21 Logan Cup.

== International career ==
The performance earned him a national selection when Zimbabwe toured Pakistan in May 2015. He made his One Day International debut for Zimbabwe against Pakistan in Lahore on May 31, 2015, where he did not get to bowl or bat, as the match ended in no result. In April 2021, he was named in Zimbabwe's Test squad, for the series against Pakistan. He made his Test debut for Zimbabwe, against Pakistan, on 29 April 2021. However, in July 2021, following the one-off Test against Bangladesh, Kaia was reported for a suspect bowling action. The following month, his bowling action was ruled to be illegal, and Kaia was suspended from bowling in international matches.
