= Natsai Mushangwe =

Natsai M'shangwe
Personal information
- Born: 9 February 1991 (age 35); Mhangura, Zimbabwe
- Batting: Right-handed
- Bowling: Leg-break
- Role: All-rounder

International information
- National side: Zimbabwe
- ODI debut: 25 October 2011 v New Zealand
- Last ODI: 3 August 2013 v India
- Source: CricInfo, 3 August 2013

Natsai M’shangwe (born 9 February 1991) is an international cricketer. He made his ODI debut in a match against the Netherlands. He is an all-rounder. Mushwange's favourite cricketer is Pakistan's all-rounder Shahid Afridi, because of Afridi's flamboyant batting with a good ability to ball legbreak, similar to that of Mushangwe. While representing the Zimbabwe XI in a match, M’shangwe scored 7 runs before getting out. He didn't take any wickets, but did have a low economy rate. In the next match M’shangwe showed his all-round ability by scoring 11 runs for the final wicket and taking the wicket of Netherlands opener Eric Szwarczynski.

== Early and domestic career ==
Mushangwe is a leg-spinner. Mushangwe is part of the emerging Zimbabwean players to help Zimbabwean Cricket improve and to aid its return to the Test Arena which Zimbabwe stopped playing in 2006 but will return to after the 2011 Cricket World Cup. Mushangwe also has the ability to bat in the lower order. He has a high score of 53, and his batting gives the selectors a certain amount of safeguard about the top order of the team.

He was the leading wicket-taker in the 2017–18 Pro50 Championship, with seventeen dismissals in eight matches.

== International career ==
He made his Test match debut for Zimbabwe against Bangladesh on 3 November 2014.

In June 2018, he was named in a Board XI team for warm-up fixtures ahead of the 2018 Zimbabwe Tri-Nation Series.
