= Mashonaland Eagles =

Zimbabwean cricket team

Personnel
- Captain: Chamu Chibhabha
- Coach: Stuart Matsikenyeri

Team information
- Colors: First-class: List A & T20:
- Founded: 2009
- Home ground: Harare Sports Club, Harare
- Capacity: 10,000

History
- First-class debut: Mountaineers in 2009–10 at Harare Sports Club
- Logan Cup wins: 3
- Pro50 Championship wins: 5
- Official website: Mash Eagles

The Mashonaland Eagles is one of five Zimbabwean cricket franchises. They are based in the Harare Metropolitan and Mashonaland Central areas and play both first-class and limited overs cricket. They play their home matches at Harare Sports Club in Harare.

== Franchise history ==
In the 2009–10 season, Zimbabwe Cricket following the decline of the standard of cricket, decided to use a new set of teams in all the first-class, List A and T20 domestic formats of the game. A total of 5 teams were named, and the Mashonaland Eagles franchise was based in Harare.

=== 2009–10 Logan Cup ===
Coming into this tournament, Mash Eagles were the favourites. They performed according to expectations by winning the tournament, by drawing the Mid West Rhinos in the final (they finished winners by virtue of finishing top of the group pool), and also coming first in the group.

On 14 September, the Eagles made their first-class debut against the Mountaineers. It was also the tournament opener. The match was drawn.

They then drew with Mid West Rhinos, and then got their first-ever first-class victory when they crushed Southern Rocks by 234 runs. They then continued their campaign with a six-wicket victory over Matabeleland Tuskers and another six-wicket win over Mountaineers. Another six wicket victory followed over Mid West Rhinos, and then a draw was achieved against the Southern Rocks at Masvingo. This was followed by a nine-wicket win over the Tuskers, which was followed by a draw with Mountaineers. Following another draw with Mid West Rhinos, the Eagles then defeated Southern Rocks by an innings and 19 runs. Following this, they suffered the first ever first-class loss, a seven-wicket defeat to the Tuskers. The final against Mid West Rhinos was drawn, but Eagles finished champions on virtue of finishing first in the group pool.

=== 2009–10 Faithwear Metbank One-Day Competition ===
Mash Eagles began their Faithwear Metbank campaign with a 4-wicket loss to Mountaineers, but duly bounced back to finish third in the pool and qualify for the semi-finals. In the semi-final, they were defeated by the Mid West Rhinos by 2 wickets, thus getting eliminated.

=== 2009–10 Stanbic Bank 20 Series ===
Mash Eagles had an excellent start to their debut Twenty20 campaign as they beat Matabeleland Tuskers by 5 wickets at Harare. They continued their good form throughout the group matches, eventually finishing first in the pool with 17 points.

By virtue of finishing top, Eagles faced Mountaineers who had finished second in the group phase. They were the hot favourites to win the game and the series, considering the fact that the Eagles had downed the Mountaineers by 82 runs at Harare in their last encounter, with the Eagle's premier spinner, Ray Price taking remarkable figures of 5/12 in 2.5 overs in a total Mountaineers batting total of 59. However the final culminated in a nine-wicket upset loss for the hosts as renowned internationals and former schoolmates Hamilton Masakadza (64*) and Tatenda Taibu (37*) led Mountaineers to the inaugural Stanbic Bank Twenty20 trophy.

=== 2010–11 Logan Cup ===
Mashonaland Eagles (the defending champions) had a poor Logan Cup. They finished in fourth place, just 2 points better than last-placed Southern Rocks. Whats more, they did not record a single win (they lost six matches and drew six).

=== 2010–11 Metbank Pro40 Championship ===
Mashonaland Eagles had a disastrous Pro40 campaign finishing absolutely bottom of the pool with just 2 wins from 8 matches. This saw them not get a place in the semi-finals, and were thus eliminated out of the competition.

=== 2010–11 Stanbic Bank 20 Series ===
After unsuccessful Logan Cup and Pro40 campaigns, Mash Eagles signed off the season in style by winning the second Stanbic Bank 20 Series. They became champions by defeating Mid West Rhinos in a one-run win. They were captained in the tournament by former Zimbabwean great Grant Flower, and contained international stars such as Andrew Hall, Ryan ten Doeschate, and Nick Compton. They had earlier qualified for the final in a one-wicket win over Matabeleland Tuskers.

=== 2011–12 Logan Cup ===
Mash Eagles opened the new season with a 3-wicket win over Southern Rocks at Masvingo. They continued that momentum with a heavy 132-run win over Mountaineers. As of proceedings till now, Mashonaland Eagles is at the second position of the group, with 2 wins, 1 draw and 1 loss in 4 matches.

=== Coca-Cola Pro50 Championship ===
The Mashonaland Eagles won the title in the 2011–2012 season, after winning 6 of their 8 games during the season.

=== 2011–12 Stanbic Bank 20 Series ===
Mash Eagles warmed up for the series with a three-match T20I series against the Kenya national cricket team. The Mash Eagles won the first match by 3 wickets mostly due to Nathan Waller's miserly spell of 1/14 in 3 overs and an unbeaten 34 off 29 by Forster Mutizwa. This was followed by another 2-wicket win over the visitors. This also secured the series. However, Kenya managed an upset 3-wicket win the last T20I, thanks to a brilliant unbeaten 42 off 21 balls by Rakep Patel, who batted down the order.

For this series, the Eagles signed up international stars such as Ryan ten Doeschate, Rory Hamilton-Brown, and Peter Trego. They however, had the worst possible start to the tournament as Matabeleland Tuskers, who were strengthened by the signings of international class players, such as Chris Gayle and Paul Horton, steam-rolled them by 7 wickets. They lost all their initial three matches, and looked all but eliminated, but had a timely 70-run victory against Southern Rocks that put them back into contention. They then defeated Mid West Rhinos by 53 runs to earn a spot in the playoff final against Matabeleland Tuskers.

In the playoff final, they defeated the favourites Tuskers in a shock win by 23 runs in the Duckworth–Lewis method. Ryan ten Doeschate's exploding 121* off 58 took the Eagles to a massive 207/7, they defeated the Tuskers despite exploding half-centuries by both Chris Gayle and Steven Trenchard. In the final they were defeated by the champions Mountaineers and the Eagles had folded for 115 thus losing by 27 runs despite chasing a target of 143.

== Players ==
When the franchise made their debut in the 2009–10 Logan Cup, they then had Zimbabwean international and domestic cricketers. Key players at that time included skipper and all-rounder Elton Chigumbura, batsmen Ryan Butterworth, Barney Rogers, the aggressive Cephas Zhuwao, all-rounders like the skipper himself, and Greg Lamb, wicket-keepers like Regis Chakabva, Forster Mutizwa, and bowlers like Douglas Hondo, Darlington Matambanadzo, and Ray Price. Their first major overseas signing was England's Chris Silverwood, who played in the 2009–10 Stanbic Bank 20 Series.

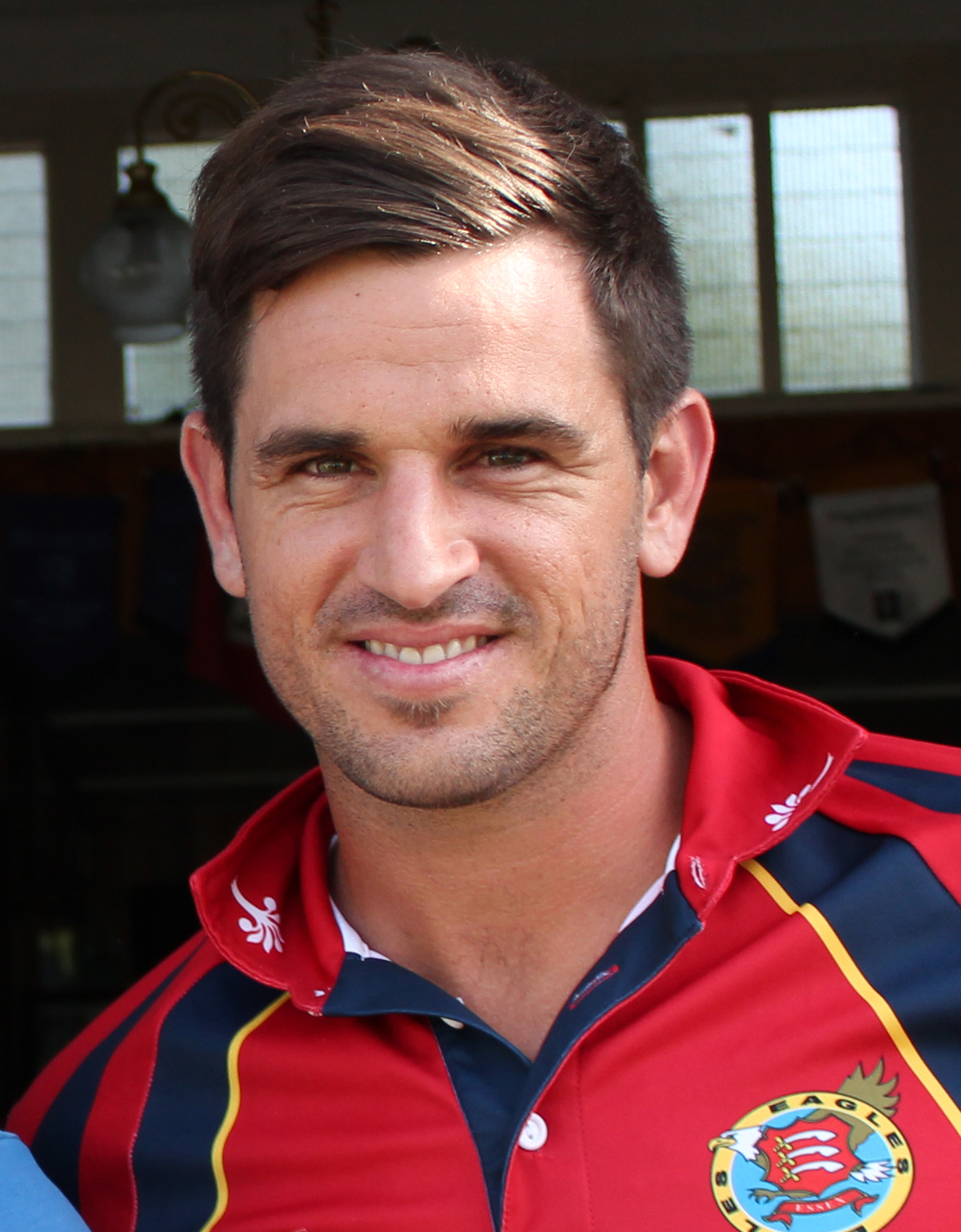
Ryan ten Doeschate, the Essex and Dutch all-rounder, has been a key player for Mashonaland Eagles.

For the 2010–11 season, the Mash Eagles had many development in their squads. Andrew Hall, who had played one-day internationals for South Africa, and was a former Northamptonshire captain, was named the player coach, while former Zimbabwean great Grant Flower was the coach. They also signed up Nottinghamshire fast bowler Charlie Shreck and South African-born Somerset batsman Nick Compton. However, the results were disappointing with poor Logan Cup and Pro40 tournaments. They however signed off the season in style with a thrilling one-run win over Mid West Rhinos in the final of the Stanbic Bank 20 Series, thus securing the trophy.

When the initial contracts of the 2011–12 season were announced, captain of the previous two seasons Elton Chigumbura was dropped as he had joined the Southern Rocks. Wicket-keeper batsman Forster Mutizwa was named as his replacement. However, later on Stuart Matsikenyeri took over as captain for the Stanbic Bank 20 Series. Also newcomers included bright prospects such as opening batsman Sikandar Raza and fast bowler Nathan Waller. Major omissions initially also included the franchise's stalwart spinner, Ray Price, but later made a comeback to the team.

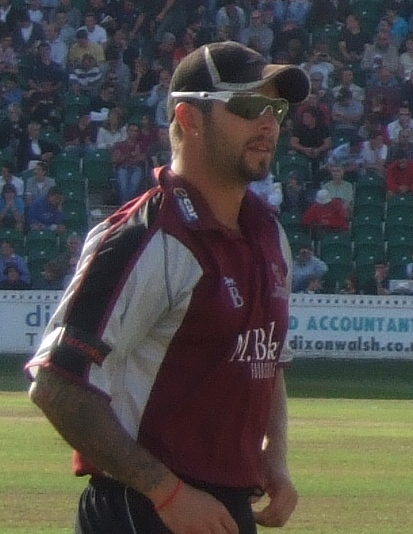
Somerset all-rounder Peter Trego was signed for the 2011–12 Stanbic Bank 20 Series, and immediately made an impression, being the player of the tournament.

For the Stanbic Bank Twenty20, former captain Chigumbura made his comeback to the team. For the later part of that tournament, overseas player Rory Hamilton-Brown captained the side. The squad also included players like Peter Trego, and Ryan ten Doeschate (retained from previous season). The Eagles had a fine tournament, finishing in second place to Mountaineers.

For the 2011–12 season, Kevin Curran was named as Mash Eagles coach, replacing Flower.

== Home stadium ==
The Eagles play their home matches in the Harare Sports Club, Harare. It has a seating capacity of 10,000. Floodlights were set in the stadium in 2011 in preparation to Zimbabwe's return to Test cricket against Bangladesh in August. Surrounded by jacaranda trees and with a beautiful gabled pavilion, Harare Sports Club is in the heart of the city. It is bordered by the heavily guarded presidential palace on one side and the prestigious Royal Harare Golf Club on another. HSC hosted Zimbabwe's first Test in October 1992 and has been the country's major Test and one-day venue since.

== Honours ==
Champion

- Logan Cup: 3
  - 2009-10, 2015-16, 2022-23
- Pro50 Championship: 5
  - 2011-12, 2012-13, 2014-15, 2015-16, 2018-19, 2023–24
- Zimbabwe Domestic Twenty20 Competition: 4
  - 2010-11 ,2016, 2022, 2023

== Administration ==
- Owners – Zimbabwe Cricket
- chief executive: Hugo Ribatika
- Player-coach: Andrew Hall
- Team manager / Team Performance Analyst: Joseph Madyembwa
