= Zimbabwe Cricket =

Sports governing body

- Sport: Cricket
- Jurisdiction: Zimbabwe
- Abbreviation: ZC
- Founded: 1981; 45 years ago
- Affiliation: International Cricket Council
- Affiliation date: July 21, 1981; 45 years ago
- Regional affiliation: Africa Cricket Association
- Affiliation date: 1997; 29 years ago
- Headquarters: Harare Sports Club, Harare
- Location: Harare, Zimbabwe
- Chairman: Tavengwa Mukuhlani
- CEO: Wilfred Mukondiwa
- Sponsor: Castle Lager, Vega Sportswear, Coca-Cola, Sanctuary Insurance, uMax, Schweppes, ZimGold

Official website
- www.zimcricket.org
- Other key staff: Chief Selector; Givemore Makoni
- (Zimbabwe)

Zimbabwe Cricket (ZC), previously known as the Zimbabwe Cricket Union (ZCU) until 2004, is the governing body for the sport of cricket in Zimbabwe. Zimbabwe Cricket is a full member of the International Cricket Council (ICC), and administers the Zimbabwe national cricket team, organising Test tours, One-Day Internationals and Twenty20 Internationals with other nations. It also organises domestic cricket, including the Castle Logan Cup, the Coca-Cola Metbank Pro50 Championship and the Stanbic Bank 20 Series in Zimbabwe.

== History ==
=== Early years ===
Following Zimbabwe's independence, the Zimbabwe Cricket Union was elected as an associate member of the ICC on 21 July 1981. The Zimbabwe Cricket Union became a full member of the ICC and gained test status in 1992 and was renamed Zimbabwe Cricket in 2004.

=== Suspension of Test status ===
Zimbabwe cricket went through major upheaval during the 2000s. During the 2003 Cricket World Cup, senior team members Andy Flower and Henry Olonga staged a "black armband protest" at the "death of democracy" in Zimbabwe, a reference to the country's political situation. Both players subsequently retired from international cricket. In 2004, the majority of the remaining senior players quit the international game following a player protest triggered by the removal of then-captain Heath Streak, resulting in a very young and inexperienced side being fielded in subsequent series against Sri Lanka and Australia. Zimbabwe's resounding defeats in those series led to the withdrawal of Test status that, apart from a brief resumption in 2005 with series against South Africa, New Zealand and India, remained in place until early 2011.

=== Return to Test cricket ===
An improvement in Zimbabwe's on-field performances, including a notable victory over Australia in the 2007 ICC World Twenty20 group stages and an overhaul of coaching staff, led to the side's Test status being reinstated, with matches against Bangladesh, Pakistan and New Zealand in late 2011. As part of the lead-up to their Test return, Zimbabwe Cricket announced major upgrades to the Harare Sports Club and Mutare Sports Club grounds. Plans for a new Test ground at Victoria Falls were also revealed. ZC also signed a three-year deal with Reebok worth $1mn to sponsor the domestic competitions and provide the kits of the Zimbabwean national cricket team.

In February 2017, Zimbabwe Cricket confirmed that an academy side would tour England later that year to play fixtures against second-XI sides, including Northamptonshire and Worcestershire. The following players were selected for the squad: Ryan Burl, Tinashe Kamunhukamwe, Taffy Mupariwa, Tafadzwa Tsiga, Tarisai Musakanda, Tylor Trenoweth, William Mashinge, Faraz Akram, Carl Mumba, Blessing Muzarabani, Tendai Nyamayaro, Mkhululi Nyathi, Richard Ngarava, Kuziva Ziwira, Thamsanqa Nunu and Brandon Mavuta.

=== ICC suspension and return ===
In September 2018, the former national team coach Heath Streak submitted an application to the court to have Zimbabwe Cricket liquidated, in relation to outstanding debts, listing the dues owed to him and other members of his coaching staff, who were all dismissed following their failed World Cup qualifying campaign in March.

In July 2019, the ICC suspended Zimbabwe Cricket, with the team barred from taking part in ICC events, which put their participation in the 2019 ICC Women's World Twenty20 Qualifier and the 2019 ICC T20 World Cup Qualifier tournaments in doubt. Later the same month, the ICC wrote to Zimbabwe Cricket, instructing them to reinstate their board that was elected on 14 June 2019, or risk the termination of their ICC membership. In October 2019, the ICC lifted its suspension on Zimbabwe Cricket, allowing them to take part in future ICC events.

In December 2022, Zimbabwe Cricket announced a six-team T10 tournament which is set to launch in March 2023. It will be called Zim Afro T10. The tournament is the first ever franchise league of the board.

== Domestic competitions ==
- Logan Cup
- Pro50 Championship
- Zimbabwe Domestic Twenty20 Competition
- National Premier League Zimbabwe

=== Teams ===
Current teams
Team	City	Home ground(s)
Mountaineers	Mutare, Manicaland	Mutare Sports Club
Mashonaland Eagles	Harare, Mashonaland	Harare Sports Club
Mid West Rhinos	Kwekwe, Midlands	Kwekwe Sports Club
Matabeleland Tuskers	Bulawayo, Matabeleland	Queens Sports Club
Southern Rocks	Masvingo	Masvingo Sports Club

=== Former teams ===
- Northerns
- Easterns
- Southerns
- Westerns
- Centrals
- Namibia

== Cricket grounds in Zimbabwe ==
Venues that held at least one game.

== See also ==
- Cricket in Zimbabwe
- Zimbabwe national cricket team
- Zimbabwe women's national cricket team
- Zimbabwe national under-19 cricket team
- Zimbabwe women's national under-19 cricket team
