= Southern Rocks =

Zimbabwean cricket team

Personnel
- Captain: Richmond Mutumbani
- Coach: Shepherd Makunura
- Overseas players: Ben Curran; Dom Bess

Team information
- Founded: 2009
- Home ground: Masvingo Sports Club, Masvingo
- Capacity: 1,000

History
- First-class debut: Mountaineers in 2009–10 at Mutare Sports Club, Manicaland

The Southern Rocks is one of five Zimbabwean cricket franchises. They are a first-class cricket team, based in the Masvingo and Matabeleland South area. They play their home matches at Masvingo Sports Club in Masvingo. The team initially ceased to play after the 2013–14 season. In their 47 first-class matches they won 3, lost 27, and drew 17. However, in December 2020, Zimbabwe Cricket confirmed they would be one of the teams playing in the 2020–21 Logan Cup. Southern Rocks won their first Logan Cup trophy in the same 2020–21 season.

== Franchise history ==
Following the decline of the standard of cricket in Zimbabwe, Zimbabwe Cricket used a new set of teams for all the first-class, List A and the Twenty20 formats of the game. The Southern Rocks were based in Masvingo and Matabeleland South area.

=== 2009–10 Logan Cup ===
The Southern Rocks debut in the Logan Cup was disastrous. The Rocks played 12 matches and lost six, while drawing six. These included heavy defeats such as a 234-run defeat to Mashonaland Eagles, an 8-wicket loss to Mountaineers, a defeat by an innings and 214 runs to Matabeleland Tuskers, an innings and 87 runs defeat to the Tuskers, an innings and 114 runs defeat to Mountaineers, an innings and 19 runs defeat to Mashonaland Eagles, etc. The team's first draw was against Mid West Rhinos, played at Masvingo Sports Club.

=== 2009–10 Faithwear Metbank One-Day Competition ===
Southern Rocks lost their first ever List A match to Mountaineers by 5 wickets at Mutare Sports Club, but duly bounced back to finish in fourth place in the group stage and qualify for the semi-final. In the semi, they were crushed by Mountaineers by seven wickets to eliminate them from the competition, despite Steve Tikolo providing some resistance to Mountaineers with a 37 in a Rocks total of 131 all out.

=== 2009–10 Stanbic Bank 20 Series ===
Rocks had a worse Stanbic Bank Twenty20 tournament in 2009–10 and finished in last place with just 1 win and four losses from five matches. Their only win came in a 43-run win over Matabeleland Tuskers, which was possible due to excellent batting from openers Chamu Chibhabha and Sikandar Raza.

=== 2010–11 Logan Cup ===
The Southern Rocks again had a very poor Logan Cup, with five defeats from 12 matches, and seven draws.

=== 2010–11 Stanbic Bank 20 Series ===
The Rocks started the series with a bang. In an attempt to win the championship, the Rocks purchased former West Indian legend Brian Lara, former English fast bowler Ryan Sidebottom, and Zimbabwean-born Hampshire batsman Sean Ervine. The first match Rocks played was lost by 28 runs, despite Lara top-scoring with 65 on Twenty20 debut. Eventually, the Rocks finished fourth in the group pool.

As the Rocks did not proceed to the semis, they fought for third place in the group with Matabeleland Tuskers. In that match, they were crushed by nine wickets with Charles Coventry leading the way with a boundary-laden 67*.

=== 2011–12 Logan Cup ===
The Rocks currently are having an Logan Cup, being at the bottom of the group with 4 defeats from 4 matches.

=== 2011–12 Coca-Cola Pro50 Championship ===
The Southern Rocks are currently third in the group with 2 victories from 5 games. They have shown promise, including a remarkable tied game against Mid West Rhinos, with Rocks captain Tatenda Taibu scoring a hundred.

=== 2011–12 Stanbic Bank 20 Series ===
Southern Rocks had an awful tournament, finishing in last place, without a single victory out of four games. The lost three, and one resulted in a no-result. They thus missed out on a place in the semi-finals, with Mashonaland Eagles sealing fourth place.

=== 2014 suspension ===
In April 2014 the Southern Rocks franchise was suspended. From the 2014–15 season Southern Rocks no longer competed, and there were only four domestic teams in Zimbabwe.

=== 2020 return ===
In December 2020, the team returned for the 2020–21 Logan Cup first-class cricket tournament. Their first game back was against Matabeleland Tuskers. In the same season the team won its first Logan Cup ending the season without a defeat.

In the Domestic T20 competition the Rocks finished third after losing to Mashonaland Eagles in the semi-finals.

== Players ==
When the franchise was debuting in the 2009-10 Logan Cup, the team consisted of Zimbabwean international and domestic players, although some foreign internationals already started taking part, for example, Kenya's Steve Tikolo and Thomas Odoyo. Key players included Chamu Chibhabha (captain), Erick Chauluka, rising star and batting talent Craig Ervine, spinner Tafadzwa Kamungozi, Keith Kondo, fast bowler Blessing Mahwire, wicket-keeper batsman Alester Maregwede, spinner Hilary Matanga, Odoyo, Tikolo, and rising young fast bowler Brian Vitori.

For the 2009-10 Stanbic Bank 20 Series, the Rocks made their first big signings when they purchased Hampshire County Cricket Club stalwart batsman, Sean Ervine, and former Australian cricketer Ian Harvey.

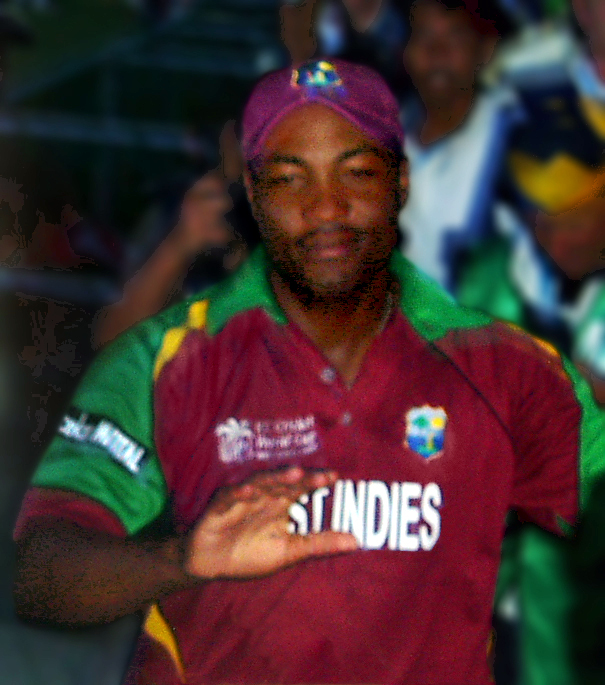
Brian Lara had a shock second coming when he played for the Southern Rocks in the Stanbic Bank 20 Series and scored 65 top-scoring for his team on Twenty20 debut. After 99 runs from 3 innings, he left citing commitments elsewhere.

They started the 2010–11 season with a bang. In a bid to win the 2010-11 Stanbic Bank 20 Series, the Rocks signed former West Indian legend Brian Lara, (who holds the record for the two highest ever scores in Test cricket: 400* and 375), and a former English great fast bowler Ryan Sidebottom. Sean Ervine also was retained from the previous season. Lara made his Twenty20 debut and scored 65 on his debut, top-scoring with 65, and added a further 34 runs from 2 innings, before leaving citing commitments elsewhere. Nevertheless, Southern Rocks finished third in the series.

For the 2011–12 season, the only substantial overseas signings were Jon Kent of South Africa and the Kenyan Alex Obanda. The results were not so bright, with Southern Rocks finishing bottom of the group pool at the 2011-12 Stanbic Bank 20 Series and thus getting eliminated. Their coach was former English O.D.I. cricketer, Monte Lynch.

In their come back season in the 2020–21 Logan Cup, they brought in Northamptonshire Top Order Batsman, Ben Curran and Essex Bowler Shane Snater. Zimbabwe internationals Blessing Muzarabani, Sikandar Raza, Tendai Chisoro, Richmond Mutumbami, Brian Mudzinganyama and Cephas Zhuwao formed the nucleus of the Southern Rocks alongside former Mountaineers players Roy Kaia, Innocent Kaia and William Mashinge.

== Home stadium ==
The Southern Rocks played their home matches in the Masvingo Sports Club, Masvingo.

== Honours ==
Champion

- Logan Cup: 1
  - 2020-21
  - 2025-26
- Pro50 Championship: 1
  - 2010-11

== Current squad ==
As of March 2024

- Richmond Mutumbami
- Johnathan Campbell
- Ben Curran
- Dom Bess
- Eddie Byrom
- Blessing Muzarabani
- Tendai Chisoro
- Richmond Mutumbami
- Brian Mudzinganyama
- Cephas Zhuwao
- Roy Kaia
- Innocent Kaia
- William Mashinge
- Tafadzwa Tsiga
- Dylan Hondo
- Trevor Gwandu
- Keith Jaure
- Kudakwashe Macheka

== Administration ==
- Owner: Zimbabwe Cricket
- General Manager: Blessing Mahwire
- Coach: Shepherd Makunura
