= Mountaineers cricket team =

Zimbabwean cricket team

Mountaineers

Personnel
- Captain: Donald Tiripano
- Coach: (Zimbabwe) Njabulo Ncube

Team information
- Founded: 2009
- Home ground: Mutare Sports Club, Mutare
- Capacity: 1,000

History
- First-class debut: Mashonaland Eagles in 2009-10 at Harare Sports Club

The Mountaineers is one of five cricket Zimbabwean cricket franchises. They are a first-class cricket team, based in the Manicaland and Mashonaland East area. They play their home matches at Mutare Sports Club in Mutare.

== Franchise history ==
Following the decline of the standards of cricket in Zimbabwe, Zimbabwe Cricket decided to use a new set of teams for all the first-class, List A and Twenty20 formats of the domestic game. A total of 5 franchises were named, and the Mountaineers team was based in Manicaland.

=== 2009-10 Logan Cup ===
On their debut in this tournament, the Mountaineers finished in third place in the group, with three wins from twelve games. Their debut first-class match against Mashonaland Eagles was a draw, thanks mainly to captain Hamilton Masakadza's century (188). Their first first-class win was against Southern Rocks, whom they crushed by eight wickets. For their third-place finish, Mountaineers could not contest the final.

=== 2009-10 Faithwear Metbank One-Day Competition ===
The Mountaineers had a brilliant tournament, winning the championship by defeating Mid West Rhinos in the final by three wickets. They underlined their dominance in the tournament, by finishing top of the pool with 6 wins from 8 games. In the semi-final, they thrashed the Southern Rocks by seven wickets to enter the final. Players who starred for Mountaineers in that match included Hamilton Masakadza (44*), Tino Mawoyo (40), Stuart Matsikenyeri (36), and Shingirai Masakadza (3-20). In the final against the Rhinos, Mountaineers restricted the opposition to a lowly first-innings score of 144, with captain Prosper Utseya taking 3-24. In return, Mountaineers themselves slipped down to 66-7, before a brilliant fightback by Shingirai Masakadza (41*) and Prosper Utseya (30*) in an unbeaten partnership and the winning runs were scored in style by Masakadza with a lofted six off Malcolm Waller. Rhinos captain Vusi Sibanda had tried nine bowlers, but nothing could break the partnership.

=== 2009-10 Stanbic Bank 20 Series ===
Despite the fact, that the Mountaineers emerged victorious in this tournament, they were pretty shaky in the group stage. They had 3 wins from 5 games, while counterparts Mashonaland Eagles (the group-toppers), had a better record than them, with 4 wins from 5 games. The Eagles were more dominant, as was proved by the 82-run downing given to them by Eagles bowler Ray Price who took figures of 5 for 12 off just 17 deliveries and took his 5th wicket as Natsai Mushangwe was stumped and the match ended. Mountaineers got better in the final, and put the aforementioned disaster behind them to score a massive nine-wicket win and upset, with the victory mostly possible due to Hamilton Masakadza (64*) and Tatenda Taibu (37*).

== Players ==
When the country was debuting in the 2009-10 Logan Cup, the team consisted of Zimbabwean international and domestic players. Key players at that time included Hamilton Masakadza (Captain), Timycen Maruma, Johnson Marumisa, Shingirai Masakadza, Stuart Matsikenyeri, Tino Mawoyo, Natsai Mushangwe, Njabulo Ncube (who later went on to join his home province Matabeleland Tuskers), Tatenda Taibu (who later on joined Southern Rocks), and Prosper Utseya.

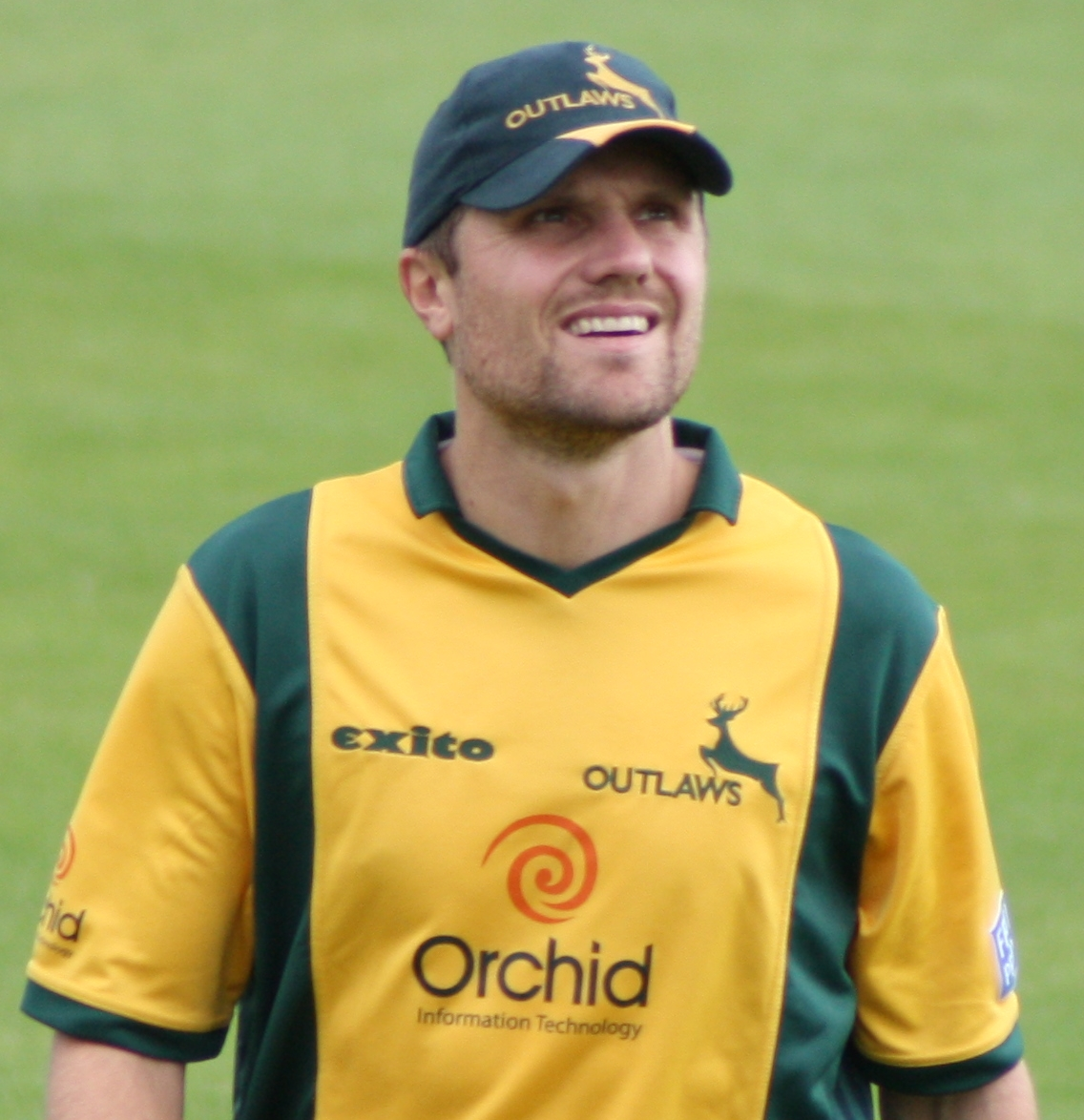
Dirk Nannes, the Australia and Royal Challengers Bangalore fast-bowler, has played the 2011-12 Stanbic Bank 20 Series with Mountaineers.

The Mountaineers made their first major overseas signing when they signed up South African all-rounder Greg Smith.

The following season, there were many improvements in the squads. Former South African great fast bowler Allan Donald was named as the franchise's head coach, while players like South Africa's Jonathan Beukes, Sean Ervine, and more prominently, former South African great all-rounder Lance Klusener, who playing in 171 ODIs, had an average of 41.10 at an impressive strike-rate of 89.91, Other signings include Liam Dawson, who scored, aged 21, scored 908 runs for Hampshire County Cricket Club, in the County Championship, and is supposed to have a long time contract with Mountaineers.

For the 2011-12 season, Mountaineers signed overseas players such as Australian star fast bowler, Dirk Nannes, former Black Caps all-rounder Chris Harris, English wicket-keeper Phil Mustard, and Ned Eckersley. Apart from that, former Zimbabwean seamer Gary Brent replaced Donald as coach.

== Current squad ==
Players with international caps are listed in bold.

No.	Name	Nat	Birth date	Batting style	Bowling style	Notes
Batsmen
3	**Timycen Maruma**	(Zimbabwe)	19 April 1988 (age 38)	Right-handed	Right-arm leg break googly	
	Innocent Kaia	(Zimbabwe)	10 August 1992 (age 34)	Right-handed	Right-arm leg break	
	Kevin Kasuza	(Zimbabwe)	20 June 1993 (age 33)	Right-handed	Right-arm off break	
12	**Tino Mawoyo**	(Zimbabwe)	8 January 1986 (age 40)	Right-handed	Right-arm medium fast	
10	**Hamilton Masakadza**	(Zimbabwe)	9 August 1983 (age 43)	Right-handed	Right-arm medium	
	Tinashe Chimbambo	(Zimbabwe)	8 February 1989 (age 37)	Right-handed	Right-arm fast-medium	
All-rounder
	**Roy Kaia**	(Zimbabwe)	10 October 1991 (age 35)	Right-handed	Right-arm off break	
Wicket-keepers
	**Forster Mutizwa**	(Zimbabwe)	24 July 1985 (age 41)	Right-handed	Right-arm off break	
	Tafadzwa Tsiga	(Zimbabwe)	13 July 1994 (age 32)	Right-handed	Right-arm medium	
	**Richmond Mutumbami**	(Zimbabwe)	11 June 1989 (age 37)	Right-handed	Right-arm offbreak	
	**Joylord Gumbie**	(Zimbabwe)	25 December 1995 (age 30)	Right-handed		
Spin Bowlers
	**Wellington Masakadza**	(Zimbabwe)	4 October 1993 (age 33)	Left-handed	Slow left-arm orthodox	
13	**Natsai M'shangwe**	(Zimbabwe)	9 February 1991 (age 35)	Right-handed	Leg break	
Pace Bowlers
15	**Donald Tiripano**	(Zimbabwe)	17 March 1988 (age 38)	Right-handed	Right-arm fast-medium	**Captain**
11	**Shingirai Masakadza**	(Zimbabwe)	4 September 1986 (age 40)	Right-handed	Right-arm fast medium	
	Victor Nyauchi	(Zimbabwe)	8 June 1992 (age 34)	Right-handed	Right-arm fast-medium	
	**William Mashinge**	(Zimbabwe)	6 October 1996 (age 30)	Right-handed	Right-arm fast-medium	
2	**Tendai Chatara**	(Zimbabwe)	28 February 1991 (age 35)	Right-handed	Right-arm fast-medium	

Source: ESPNCricinfo

== Honours ==
Champion

- Logan Cup: 4
  - 2013-14, 2016-17, 2017-18, 2018-19
- Pro50 Championship: 4
  - 2009-10, 2013-14, 2021-22, 2022-23 ,
