= 2024 Zimbabwe Domestic Twenty20 =

Cricket tournament

2023–24 Zimbabwe Domestic Twenty20 Competition
- Dates: 3 March – 9 March 2024
- Administrator: Zimbabwe Cricket
- Cricket format: Twenty20
- Tournament format(s): Round-robin and knockout
- Host: Zimbabwe
- Champions: Durham (1st title)
- Runners-up: Eagles
- Participants: 6
- Matches: 18
- Most runs: Ryan Burl (Rhinos) (239)
- Most wickets: Jalat Khan (Rocks) (13)

The 2024 Zimbabwe Domestic Twenty20 Competition was the 13th edition of the Zimbabwe Domestic Twenty20 Competition, a domestic Twenty20 cricket league that was played in Zimbabwe. The tournament took place from the 3 to 9 March 2024. Along with the five franchise teams, English County cricket team Durham Cricket Club participated for the first time in the competition. Durham extended their unbeaten streak into the final, clinching victory by a margin of 213 runs after dismissing the Mashonaland Eagles for a mere 16 runs.

== Squads ==
Squads

Durham	Eagles	Mountaineers	Rocks	Rhinos	Tuskers
Alex Lees (c); Ben McKinney; Graham Clark; Michael Jones; Bas de Leede; Colin Ackermann; Jonathan Bushnell; Paul Coughlin; Scott Borthwick; Haydon Mustard (wk); Ollie Robinson (wk); Ben Raine; Callum Parkinson; George Drissell; Luke Robinson; Nathan Sowter; Oliver Gibson; Stanley McAlindon	Chamu Chibhabha; Craig Ervine; Kudzai Maunze; Mathew Welch; Nick Welch; Rodney Mupfudza; Tinashe Kamunhukamwe; Tinotenda Mutombodzi; Alex Falao; Faraz Akram; Marshal Takodza; Romario Roach; Trevor Mutsamba; Wessly Madhevere; Cunningham Ncube (wk); Larvet Masunda (wk); Tadiwanashe Marumani (wk); Tinashe Nenhunzi (wk); Alex Russell; Hamza Sajjad; Matt Parkinson; Munashe Chipara; Owen Muzondo; Richard Ngarava; Tanaka Chivanga; Tapiwa Mufudza; Tawanda Dzikiti	Baxon Gopito; Brian Bennett; Kevin Kasuza; Tariro Makauyo; Timycen Maruma; Tinashe Chiorah; Tony Munyonga; Clive Chitumba; Definite Mawadzi; Dion Myers; Donald Tiripano; Shingi Masakadza; Tinashe Muchawaya; Vincent Masekesa; Dane Schadendorf (wk); Joylord Gumbie (wk); Nigel Bonyongwe (wk); Peter Moor (wk); Spencer Magodo (wk); Fortune Mhlanga; Hendricks Macheke; John Masara; Mashford Shungu; Prosper Mugeri; Salman Mirza; Tendai Chatara; Victor Nyauchi; Wellington Masakadza	Chamu Chibhabha; Craig Ervine; Kudzai Maunze; Mathew Welch; Nick Welch; Rodney Mupfudza; Tinashe Kamunhukamwe; Tinotenda Mutombodzi; Alex Falao; Faraz Akram; Marshal Takodza; Romario Roach; Trevor Mutsamba; Wessly Madhevere; Cunningham Ncube (wk); Larvet Masunda (wk); Tadiwanashe Marumani (wk); Tinashe Nenhunzi (wk); Alex Russell; Hamza Sajjad; Matt Parkinson; Munashe Chipara; Owen Muzondo; Richard Ngarava; Tanaka Chivanga; Tapiwa Mufudza; Tawanda Dzikiti	Prince Masvaure; Remembrance Nyathi; Takudzwanashe Kaitano; Tarisai Musakanda; Bright Matsiwe (wk); Nyasha Mayavo (wk); Patrick Rowe (wk); Antum Naqvi; Brandon Mavuta; Muhammad Ali; Neville Madziva; Ollard Dzinokuvara; Ryan Burl; Tashinga Musekiwa; Victor Chirwa; Carl Mumba; Christopher Masike; Clifford Takaedza; Davis Murwendo; Jabulisa Tshuma; Manson Chikowero; Michael Chinouya; Ronald Masocha; Simon Mugava; Tafara Chingwara; Wallace Mubaiwa; Walter Matawu	Allan Chigoma; Alvin Chiradza; Awad Naqvi; Brian Chari; Hamid AliAkbar; Milton Shumba; Munashe Chimusoro; Nkosana Mpofu; Samiullah jnr; Simbarashe Haukozi; Tanunurwa Makoni; Dylan Nzvenga; Elvin Nxumalo; Luke Jongwe; Sean Williams (c); Tawanada Maposa; Tinotenda Maposa; Adrian Mupembe (wk); Clive Madande (wk); Dalubhle Mboyi (wk); Taffy Mupariwa (wk); Ainsley Ndlovu; Arnold Shara; Brandon James; Bright Phiri; Charlton Tshuma; Chris Mpofu; Ernest Masuku; Hamidullah Qadri; Mamoon Riaz; Mgcini Dube; Nkosibongwe Gogodo; Sheunopa Musekwa; Tanatswa Bechani

== Points table ==
Pos	Team	Pld	W	L	NR	BP	Pts	NRR
1	Durham (C)	5	5	0	0	3	13	3.037
2	Eagles	5	3	2	0	1	7	−0.282
3	Mountaineers	5	3	2	0	0	6	−0.168
4	Rhinos	5	2	3	0	1	5	−0.172
5	Rocks	5	2	3	0	0	4	−0.392
6	Tuskers	5	0	5	0	0	0	−1.477

Updated to match(es) played on 7 March 2024. Source: Cricinfo
(C) Champions

Advanced to the Final
Advanced to the 3rd place play-off
Advanced to the 5th place play-off

== Fixtures ==
=== Round-robin ===
3 March 2024
9:30
Scorecard

Rocks; 177/6 (20 overs)	v	Rhinos; 177/9 (20 overs)
Cephas Zhuwao 86 (52); Tashinga Musekiwa 3/24 (4 overs)		Ryan Burl 47 (31); William Mashinge 4/32 (4 overs)

Match tied (Rhinos won the Super Over)
Old Hararians, Harare
Umpires: Iknow Chabi and David Shawane
Player of the match: Antum Naqvi (Rhinos)

- Rhinos won the toss and elected to field.
- Jalat Khan, Jayden Schadendorf (Rocks) and Muhammad Adil (Rhinos) all made their T20 debuts.
- Super Over: Rhinos 17/1, Rocks 2/2.
- Points: Southern Rocks 0, Mid West Rhinos 2

3 March 2024
13:30
Scorecard

Durham; 192/4 (20 overs)	v	Mountaineers; 139/7 (20 overs)
Alex Lees 92* (59); Salman Mirza 2/14 (4 overs)		Timycen Maruma 45 (29); Luke Robinson 2/28 (4 overs)

Durham won by 53 runs
Harare Sports Club, Harare
Umpires: Ashby Mutumbami and Christopher Phiri
Player of the match: Alex Lees (Durham)

- Durham won the toss and elected to bat.
- Haydon Mustard (Durham) and Baxon Gopito (Mountaineers) both made their T20 debuts.
- Points: Durham 3, Mountaineers 0. (Durham were awarded a Bonus Point)

3 March 2024
18:30 (N)
Scorecard

Eagles; 136/9 (20 overs)	v	Tuskers; 124/9 (20 overs)
Chamu Chibhabha 30 (40); Ernest Masuku 3/23 (3 overs)		Luke Jongwe 34 (36); Tanaka Chivanga 3/25 (4 overs)

Eagles won by 12 runs
Harare Sports Club, Harare
Umpires: Forster Mutizwa and Nkosehle Ndiweni
Player of the match: Tanaka Chivanga (Eagles)

- Eagles won the toss and elected to bat.
- Owen Muzondo, Hamza Sajjad (Eagles) and Ben MicKinney (Tuskers) all made their T20 debuts.
- Points: Mashonaland Eagles 2, Matabeleland Tuskers 0

4 March 2024
9:30
Scorecard

Rhinos; 152/8 (20 overs)	v	Tuskers; 118 (19.5 overs)
Takudzwanashe Kaitano 51 (36); Sean Williams 3/7 (4 overs)		Milton Shumba 27 (17); Antum Naqvi 2/21 (4 overs)

Rhinos won by 34 runs
Old Hararians, Harare
Umpires: Ashby Mutumbami and Langton Rusere
Player of the match: Antum Naqvi (Rhinos)

- Tuskers won the toss and elected to field.
- Points: Mid West Rhinos 3, Matabeleland Tuskers 0. (Rhinos were awarded a Bonus Point)

4 March 2024
13:30
Scorecard

Mountaineers; 149/9 (20 overs)	v	Rocks; 153/3 (18.4 overs)
Baxon Gopito 32 (18); Tendai Chisoro 3/25 (4 overs)		Eddie Byrom 78* (54); Salman Mirza 2/29 (3.4 overs)

Rocks won by 7 wickets
Old Hararians, Harare
Umpires: Forster Mutizwa and Collin Tlou
Player of the match: Eddie Byrom (Rocks)

- Rocks won the toss and elected to field.
- Prosper Mugeri (Mountaineers) made his T20 debut.
- Points: Southern Rocks 2, Mountaineers 0

4 March 2024
18:30 (N)
Scorecard

Durham; 185/5 (20 overs)	v	Eagles; 113/9 (20 overs)
Colin Ackermann 90* (52); Tapiwa Mufudza 2/27 (4 overs)		Tadiwanashe Marumani 37 (28); Callum Parkinson 3/14 (4 overs)

Durham won by 72 runs
Harare Sports Club, Harare
Umpires: Stanley Gogwe and Christopher Phiri
Player of the match: Colin Ackermann (Durham)

- Durham won the toss and elected to bat.
- Points: Durham 3, Mashonaland Eagles 0. (Durham were awarded a Bonus Point)

5 March 2024
9:30
Scorecard

Rhinos; 164/5 (20 overs)	v	Eagles; 166/8 (19.4 overs)
Nyasha Mayavo 36* (29); Marshal Takodza 2/21 (4 overs)		Tadiwanashe Marumani 75 (48); Muhammad Adil 2/24 (4 overs)

Eagles won by 2 wickets
Old Hararians, Harare
Umpires: Tafadzwa Musakwa and Christopher Phiri
Player of the match: Tadiwanashe Marumani (Eagles)

- Eagles won the toss and elected to field.
- Points: Mashonaland Eagles 2, Mid West Rhinos 0

5 March 2024
13:30
Scorecard

Durham; 174/5 (20 overs)	v	Rocks; 71/7 (9 overs)
Colin Ackermann 52 (23); Jalat Khan 2/23 (4 overs)		Roy Kaia 17 (11); Oli Gibson 3/12 (2 overs)

Durham won by 16 runs (DLS method)
Harare Sports Club, Harare
Umpires: Collin Tlou and Stanley Gogwe
Player of the match: Oli Gibson (Durham)

- Durham won the toss and elected to bat.
- Southern Rocks were set a revised target of 88 runs in 9 overs.
- Oli Gibson (Durham) made his T20 debut.
- Points: Durham 2, Southern Rocks 0

5 March 2024
18:30 (N)
Scorecard

Mountaineers; 110 (19.5 overs)	v	Tuskers; 74/3 (11.4 overs)
Sean Williams 38 (32); Salman Mirza 4/11 (3.5 overs)		Brian Bennett 26* (22); Sean Williams 1/13 (2 overs)

Mountaineers won by 5 wickets
Harare Sports Club, Harare
Umpires: David Shawane and Forster Mutizwa
Player of the match: Salman Mirza (Tuskers)

- Matabeleland Tuskers elected to bat.
- Adrian Mupembe (Tuskers) made his T20 debut.
- Points: Mountaineers 2, Tuskers 0.

7 March 2024
9:30
Scorecard

Eagles; 190/6 (20 overs)	v	Mountaineers; 191/6 (18.3 overs)
Tadiwanashe Marumani 64 (37); Salman Mirza 2/30 (4 overs)		Brian Bennett 58 (31); Marshal Takodza 2/42 (4 overs)

Mountaineers won by 4 wickets
Old Hararians, Harare
Umpires: Stanley Gogwe and Oscar Tafirenyika
Player of the match: Wellington Masakadza (Mountaineers)

- Mountaineers won the toss and elected to field.
- Points: Mountaineers 2, Eagles 0.

7 March 2024
13:30
Scorecard

Tuskers; 158/8 (20 overs)	v	Rocks; 161/7 (19.3 overs)
Milton Shumba 42 (36); Jalat Khan 3/24 (4 overs)		Eddie Byrom 54 (31); Charlton Tshuma 3/35 (3.3 overs)

Rocks won by 3 wickets
Old Hararians, Harare
Umpires: Forster Mutizwa and Panashe Marovatsanga
Player of the match: Jalat Khan (Rocks)

- Rocks won the toss and elected to field.
- Points: Rocks 2, Tuskers 0.

7 March 2024
18:30 (N)
Scorecard

Durham; 161/7 (17 overs)	v	Rhinos; 130/7 (17 overs)
Paul Coughlin 47* (21); Wallace Mubayiwa 4/20 (4 overs)		Ryan Burl 56 (38); Callum Parkinson 2/9 (2 overs)

Durham won by 31 runs
Harare Sports Club, Harare
Umpires: Ashby Mutumbami and Nkosehle Ndiweni
Player of the match: Callum Parkinson (Durham)

- Durham elected to bat
- Due to rain the match was reduced to 17 overs a side.
- Points: Durham 2, Mid West Rhinos 0

8 March 2024
9:30
Scorecard

Rhinos; 171/5 (20 overs)	v	Mountaineers; 172/4 (18.2 overs)
Ryan Burl 60* (44); Victor Nyauchi 4/38 (4 overs)		Tony Munyonga 71* (45); Neville Madziva 2/21 (3 overs)

Mountaineers won by 6 wickets
Old Hararians, Harare
Umpires: Asbhy Mutumbami and Collin Tlou
Player of the match: Tony Munyonga (Mountaineers)

- Mountaineers won the toss and elected to field.
- Points: Mountaineers 2, Rhinos 0.

8 March 2024
13:30
Scorecard

Tuskers; 115 (19.4 overs)	v	Durham; 119/4 (11.1 overs)
Sean Williams 27 (29); Nathan Sowter 3/17 (4 overs)		Bas de Leede 30 (15); Sean Williams 2/30 (3 overs)

Durham won by 6 wickets
Harare Sports Club, Harare
Umpires: Forster Mutizwa and Tafadwza Musakwa
Player of the match: Callum Parkison (Durham)

- Tuskers won the toss and elected to bat.
- Points: Durham 3, Tuskers 0.

8 March 2024
18:30 (N)
Scorecard

Eagles; 148/9 (20 overs)	v	Rocks; 108 (18.4 overs)
Marshal Takodza 38* (43); Roy Kaia 3/18 (4 overs)		Tafadwza Tsiga 28 (30); Marshal Takodza 3/23 (4 overs)

Eagles won by 40 runs
Harare Sports Club, Harare
Umpires: Stanley Gogwe and David Shawane
Player of the match: Marshal Takodza (Eagles)

- Rocks won the toss and elected to field.
- Points: Eagles 3, Rocks 0.

== Play-offs ==
=== 5th place play-off ===
5th Place
9 March 2024
9:30
Scorecard

Matabeleland Tuskers; 177/6 (20 overs)	v	Rocks; 118 (19.2 overs)
Clive Madande 99* (61); Jalat Khan 2/24 (4 overs)		Tendai Chisoro 23 (24); Ainsley Ndlovu 4/15 (4 overs)

Tuskers won by 59 runs
Harare Sports Club, Harare
Umpires: Panashe Marovatsanga and Tafadwza Musakwa
Player of the match: Clive Madande (Tuskers)

- Tuskers won the toss and elected to bat.

=== 3rd place play-off ===
3rd Place
9 March 2024
13:30
Scorecard

Mountaineers; 162/6 (20 overs)	v	Rhinos; 163/3 (18.2 overs)
Joylord Gumbie 72 (57); Davis Murwendo 2/6 (2 overs)		Ben Curran 50* (40); Salman Mirza 2/20 (3.2 overs)

Rhinos won by 7 wickets
Harare Sports Club, Harare
Umpires: David Shawane and Oscar Tafirenyika
Player of the match: Ben Curran (Rhinos)

- Rhinos won the toss and elected to field.

=== Final ===
Final
9 March 2024
18:30 (N)
Scorecard

Durham; 229/6 (20 overs)	v	Eagles; 16 (8.1 overs)
Bas de Leede 58 (29); Tanaka Chivanga 2/35 (4 overs)		Tapiwa Mufudza 4* (6); Luke Robinson 2/0 (1 over)

Durham won by 213 runs
Harare Sports Club, Harare
Umpires: Stanley Gogwe and Forster Mutizwa
Player of the match: Haydon Mustard (Durham)

- Durham won the toss and elected to bat.
- 16 runs by Eagles was the third-lowest total in men's T20s, and the 213 runs victory margin was the third-largest margin in men's T20s.
