= 2022–23 Logan Cup =

Cricket tournament

- Dates: 24 November 2022 – 1 April 2023
- Administrator: Zimbabwe Cricket
- Cricket format: First-class cricket (4 days)
- Tournament format: Double round-robin
- Champions: Mashonaland Eagles (3rd title)
- Participants: 5
- Matches: 20
- Most runs: Ben Compton (714)
- Most wickets: Tapiwa Mufudza (29); Brandon Mavuta (29)

The 2022–23 Logan Cup was the 29th edition of the Logan Cup, a first-class cricket competition in Zimbabwe, which started on 24 November 2022. The tournament included twenty matches, eight games per team with the tournament concluding on 1 April 2023. The Matabeleland Tuskers were the defending champions. The tournament was won by the Mashonaland Eagles, which is the third time the team won since the introduction of franchise cricket.

The season was marred by the mid-season death of Southern Rocks head coach Shepherd Makunura, who died from a long-standing illness on 15 December 2022.

== Points table ==
| Pos | Team | Pld | W | D | L | Pts |
|---|---|---|---|---|---|---|
| 1 | Mashonaland Eagles | 8 | 3 | 4 | 1 | 122 |
| 2 | Mid West Rhinos | 8 | 3 | 3 | 2 | 117 |
| 3 | Mountaineers | 8 | 1 | 6 | 1 | 111 |
| 4 | Matabeleland Tuskers | 8 | 2 | 4 | 2 | 110 |
| 5 | Southern Rocks | 8 | 1 | 3 | 4 | 85 |

Updated to match(es) played on 1 April 2023. Source: ESPNcricinfo
Rules for classification: 10 points for a win, 6 for a tie, 5 for a draw, 0 for a loss. An extra 2 points are awarded for an innings victory.
- Batting bonus points: 1 point each for reaching 200, 250, 300, and 350 runs in each innings.
- Bowling bonus points: 1 point each for taking 3, 5, 7, and 9 wickets in each innings.

=== Match Summary ===
The total team points at the end of each round are listed.

| Team | Round | | | | | | | | | | Total |
| Team | 1 | 2 | 3 | 4 | 5 | 6 | 7 | 8 | 9 | 10 | Total |
|---|---|---|---|---|---|---|---|---|---|---|---|
| Mashonaland Eagles | 22 | 44 | 61 | 83 | 87 | 87 | 93 | 106 | 122 | 122 | 122 |
| Mid West Rhinos | 21 | 29 | 37 | 37 | 61 | 75 | 84 | 84 | 93 | 117 | 117 |
| Mountaineers | 11 | 11 | 27 | 49 | 60 | 74 | 82 | 95 | 95 | 111 | 111 |
| Matabeleland Tuskers | 0 | 23 | 45 | 49 | 49 | 57 | 68 | 80 | 93 | 110 | 110 |
| Southern Rocks | 8 | 19 | 19 | 27 | 38 | 60 | 60 | 69 | 79 | 85 | 85 |

| Win | Loss | Draw | Bye |

== Fixtures ==
=== Round 1 ===
24–27 November 2022
Scorecard

| Mashonaland Eagles | v | Southern Rocks |
| 517 (109 overs); Craig Ervine 153 (172); Keith Jaure 3/71 (19 overs) | | 167 (73 overs); Richmond Mutumbami 35 (72); Tapiwa Mufudza 3/38 (18 overs) |
| 99/4d (14 overs); Tadiwanashe Marumani 53 (43); Sydney Murombo 3/51 (7 overs) | | 348 (122.1 overs); William Mashinge 69 (139); Brad Evans 3/70 (24 overs) |

Mashonaland Eagles won by 101 runs
Old Hararians, Harare
Umpires: Forster Mutizwa and Stanley Gogwe
Player of the match: Wesley Madhevere (Eagles)

- Southern Rocks won the toss and elected to field.
- Sydney Murombo and Takudzwa Chataira (Southern Rocks), and Munashe Chipara (Mashonaland Eagles) all made their first-class debut.
- Points: Mashonaland Eagles 22, Southern Rocks 8

24–26 November 2022
Scorecard

| Mid West Rhinos | v | Mountaineers |
| 280 (62.5 overs); Kiran Carlson 92* (126); Donald Tiripano 4/57 (14 overs) | | 271 (70.1 overs); Tony Munyonga 66 (141); Tafara Chingwara 5/78 (16 overs) |
| 228 (52.5 overs); Eddie Byrom 61 (74); Wellington Masakadza 5/37 (14 overs) | | 212 (57.5 overs); Tony Munyonga 89 (150); Carl Mumba 3/44 (11.2 overs) |

Mid West Rhinos won by 25 runs
Harare Sports Club, Harare
Umpires: Iknow Chabi and Tafadzwa Musakwa
Player of the match: Tafara Chingwara (Rhinos)

- Mountaineers won the toss and elected to field.
- Points: Mid West Rhinos 21, Mountaineers 11
- Spencer Magodo (Mountaineers) made his first-class debut.

=== Round 2 ===
1–4 December 2022
Scorecard

| Mid West Rhinos | v | Mashonaland Eagles |
| 455 (114.1 overs); Ryan Burl 128 (160); Tanaka Chivanga 2/70 (25 overs) | | 581 (137.2 overs); Craig Ervine 123 (200); Ryan Burl 4/89 (17.2 overs) |
| 190 (55.3 overs); Remembrance Nyathi 45 (95); Tanaka Chivanga 4/53 (15.3 overs) | | 68/1 (9 overs); Tinashe Kamunhukamwe 34 (26); Johnathan Campbell 1/17 (2 overs) |

Mashonaland Eagles won by 9 wickets
Harare Sports Club, Harare
Umpires: David Shawane and Iknow Chabi
Player of the match: Brad Evans (Eagles)

- Mid West Rhinos won the toss and elected to bat.
- Points: Mashonaland Eagles 22, Mid West Rhinos 8.
- Alex Falao (Mashonaland Eagles) made his first-class debut.

1–4 December 2022
Scorecard

| Matabeleland Tuskers | v | Southern Rocks |
| 366 (72.4 overs); Sean Williams 99 (62); Privilege Chesa 5/70 (17.4 overs) | | 337 (107.1 overs); Richmond Mutumbami 108* (184); Sean Williams 5/93 (32 overs) |
| 212 (54.4 overs); Ainsley Ndlovu 42 (38); Privilege Chesa 6/86 (21 overs) | | 165 (51.1 overs); Richmond Mutumbami 36 (40); Sean Williams 6/47 (18.1 overs) |

Matabeleland Tuskers won by 76 runs
Old Hararians, Harare
Umpires: Percival Sizara and Stanley Gogwe
Player of the match: Sean Williams (Tuskers)

- Matabeleland Tuskers won the toss and elected to bat.
- Points: Matabeleland Tuskers 23, Southern Rocks 11.

=== Round 3 ===
10–13 December 2022
Scorecard

| Matabeleland Tuskers | v | Mid West Rhinos |
| 214 (62.2 overs); Kiran Carlson 77 (119); Sheunopa Musekwa 3/28 (9.2 overs) | | 432 (116.1 overs); Nkosana Mpofu 122 (191); Brandon Mavuta 4/143 (41 overs) |
| 313 (90.4 overs); Johnathan Campbell 68 (100); Sean Williams 4/44 (18.4 overs) | | 98/2 (16.2 overs); Taffy Mupariwa 50* (48); Johnathan Campbell 1/16 (3 overs) |

Matabeleland Tuskers won by 8 wickets
Old Hararians, Harare
Umpires: Langton Rusere and Percival Sizara
Player of the match: Sean Williams (Tuskers)

- Mid West Rhinos won the toss and elected to bat.
- Christophe Masike (Mid West Rhinos) made his first-class debut.
- Points: Matabeleland Tuskers 22, Mid West Rhinos 8

11–14 December 2022
Scorecard

| Mountaineers | v | Mashonaland Eagles |
| 329 (93.2 overs); Tony Munyonga 93 (145); Tanaka Chivanga 5/63 (16.3 overs) | | 383 (97.1 overs); Craig Ervine 93 (104); Shingi Masakadza 2/36 (15 overs) |
| 345 (86.4 overs); Ben Compton 154 (233); Brad Evans 4/78 (21 overs) | | 71/3 (16 overs); Kudzai Maunze 34 (42); Victor Nyauchi 2/33 (8 overs) |

Match drawn
Harare Sports Club, Harare
Umpires: Iknow Chabi and Oscar Tafirenyika
Player of the match: Ben Compton (Mountaineers)

- Mountaineers won the toss and elected to bat.
- Brian Bennett (Mountaineers) made his first-class debut.
- Points: Mashonaland Eagles 17, Mountaineers 16

=== Round 4 ===
18–21 December 2022
Scorecard

| Mountaineers | v | Southern Rocks |
| 176 (50.3 overs); Shingi Masakadza 55* (68); Takudzwa Chataira 4/78 (17 overs) | | 190 (63.2 overs); Innocent Kaia 42 (72); Victor Nyauchi 4/31 (15.2 overs) |
| 468/9d (97.2 overs); Ben Compton 217 (256); Brian Mudzinganyama 4/44 (8.2 overs) | | 149 (49.2 overs); Tafadzwa Tsiga 66* (100); Victor Nyauchi 5/54 (18.2 overs) |

Mountaineers won by 305 runs
Harare Sports Club, Harare
Umpires: Forster Mutizwa and Christopher Phiri
Player of the match: Ben Compton (Mountaineers)

- Southern Rocks won the toss and elected to field.
- Blessed Muzite (Southern Rocks) and Fortune Mhlanga (Mountaineers) made their first-class debut.
- Points: Mountaineers 22, Southern Rocks 8

18–20 December 2022
Scorecard

| Mashonaland Eagles | v | Matabeleland Tuskers |
| 296 (77.5 overs); Faraz Akram 70* (119); Tanatswa Bechani 5/91 (26.5 overs) | | 98 (38.3 overs); Nkosana Mpofu 25 (57); Faraz Akram 3/32 (11 overs) |
| | | 165 (52.1 overs) (f/o); Luke Jongwe 52 (67); Richard Ngarava 4/31 (12 overs) |

Mashonaland Eagles won by an innings and 33 runs
Old Hararians, Harare
Umpires: Tafadzwa Musakwa and Langton Rusere
Player of the match: Faraz Akram (Eagles)

- Matabeleland Tuskers won the toss and elected to field.
- Simbarashe Haukozi (Mashonaland Eagles) and Tanatswa Bechani (Matabeleland Tuskers) made their first-class debut.
- Points: Mashonaland Eagles 22, Matabeleland Tuskers 4

=== Round 5 ===
7–9 January 2023
Scorecard

| Mashonaland Eagles | v | Mid West Rhinos |
| 92 (29.5 overs); Tinashe Kamunhukamwe 35 (42); Brandon Mavuta 5/17 (9.5 overs) | | 383 (104.5 overs); Antum Naqvi 140* (232); Tapiwa Mufudza 4/106 (38.5 overs) |
| 158 (55.4 overs); Nick Welch 39 (50); Brandon Mavuta 6/85 (26 overs) |

Mid West Rhinos won by an innings and 133 runs
Kwekwe Sports Club, Kwekwe
Umpires: Ashby Mutumbami and Stanley Gogwe
Player of the match: Brandon Mavuta (Rhinos)

- Mid West Rhinos won the toss and elected to field.
- Bad light prevented any further play on Day 1.
- Antum Naqvi (Mid West Rhinos) made his first-class debut.
- Antum Naqvi scored his maiden century in first-class cricket.
- Points: Mid West Rhinos 24, Mashonaland Eagles 4

7–10 January 2023
Scorecard

| Mountaineers | v | Southern Rocks |
| 260 (54.2 overs); Shingi Masakadza 63 (47); Cuthbert Musoko 6/48 (14 overs) | | 261 (58.5 overs); Roy Kaia 61 (60); Shingi Masakadza 5/42 (8.5 overs) |
| 23/0 (3 overs); Tinashe Muchawaya 12* (12) |

Match drawn
Old Hararians, Harare
Umpires: Sifelani Rwaziyeni and Tafadzwa Musakwa
Player of the match: Cuthbert Musoko (Rocks)

- Southern Rocks won the toss and elected to field.
- Bad light prevented any further play on Day 1.
- No play was possible on Day 2.
- Points: Mountaineers 11, Southern Rocks 11

=== Round 6 ===
14–17 January 2023
Scorecard

| Southern Rocks | v | Matabeleland Tuskers |
| 282 (95.3 overs); Ben Curran 134 (261); Ainsley Ndlovu 4/70 (34 overs) | | 156 (60.5 overs); Milton Shumba 44 (83); Privilege Chesa 5/33 (13.5 overs) |
| 295/8d (39 overs); Richmond Mutumbami 71 (168); Hamidullah Qadri 5/92 (27 overs) | | 215 (71.1 overs); Awad Naqvi 67 (171); Roy Kaia 7/58 (35 overs) |

Southern Rocks won by 206 runs
Queens Sports Club, Bulawayo
Player of the match: Roy Kaia (Rocks)

- Southern Rocks won the toss and elected to bat.
- Awad Naqvi (Matabeleland Tuskers) made his first-class debut.
- Points: Southern Rocks 22, Matabeleland Tuskers 8

14–17 January 2023
Scorecard

| Mountaineers | v | Mid West Rhinos |
| 285 (66.5 overs); Timycen Maruma 91 (105); Michael Chinouya 4/42 (12.5 overs) | | 513 (107.4 overs); Antum Naqvi 103 (158); Vincent Masekesa 3/135 (26 overs) |
| 326/3 (26.3 overs); Ben Compton 131 (229); Johnathan Campbell 1/7 (3 overs) |

Match drawn
Old Hararians, Harare
Umpires: Oscar Tafirenyika and Tafadzwa Musakwa
Player of the match: Antum Naqvi (Rhinos)

- Mid West Rhinos won the toss and elected to field
- Tashinga Musekiwa (Mid West Rhinos) made his first-class debut.
- Points: Mountaineers 14, Mid West Rhinos 14

=== Round 7 ===
21–24 January 2023
Scorecard

| Mashonaland Eagles | v | Mountaineers |
| 316/5 (96 overs); Ben Compton 105 (151); Tapiwa Mufudza 3/107 (37 overs) |

Match drawn
Old Hararians, Harare
Umpires: Sifelani Rwaziyeni & Walter Musakwa
Player of the match: Tapiwa Mufudza (Mountaineers)

- Mashonaland Eagles won the toss and elected to field.
- Bad Light prevented any further play on Day 1 (88.5 overs were lost).
- Rain and a wet-outfiled prevented any further play on Day 3 and 4.
- Hamid Ali (Mashonaland Eagles) made his first-class debut.
- Points: Mountaineers 8, Mashonaland Eagles 6

21–24 January 2023
Scorecard

| Matabeleland Tuskers | v | Mid West Rhinos |
| 295 (87 overs); Milton Shumba 121* (160); Antum Naqvi 3/73 (21 overs) | | 146/9 (70 overs); Tarisai Musakanda 35* (140); Charlton Tshuma 3/45 (15 overs) |

Match drawn
Kwekwe Sports Club, Kwekwe
Umpires: Stanley Gogwe & Tafadzwa Musakwa
Player of the match: Milton Shumba (Tuskers)

- Matabeleland Tuskers won the toss and elected to bat.
- Bad Light and rain prevented any further play on Day 1 (9.3 overs were lost).
- Bad Light and rain prevented any further play on Day 2 (22 overs were lost).
- Rain and a wet-outfiled prevented any further play on Day 3 and 4.
- Prince Kaunda (Matabeleland Tuskers) made his first-class debut.
- Points: Matabeleland Tuskers 11, Mid West Rhinos 9

=== Round 8 ===
3–6 February 2023
Scorecard

| Southern Rocks | v | Mashonaland Eagles |
| 114 (24.1 overs); Richmond Mutumbami 44 (39); Matt Parkinson 5/26 (7.1 overs) | | 228 (60 overs); Larvet Masunda 76 (125); Sydney Murombo 3/36 (11 overs) |
| 190/7 (99.1 overs); Richmond Mutumbami 58 (154); Munashe Chipara 3/18 (12 overs) |

Match drawn
Old Hararians, Harare
Umpires: Percival Sizara & Tafadzwa Musakwa
Player of the match: Matt Parkinson (Eagles)

- Southern Rocks won the toss and elected to bat
- Bad light prevented any further play on Day 1 (18.5 overs were lost).
- Bad light and rain prevented any further play on Day 2
- Wet outfield and Rain delayed the game on Day 3
- Points: Southern Rocks 9, Mashonaland Eagles 13

3–6 February 2023
Scorecard

| Matabeleland Tuskers | v | Mountaineers |
| 294 (74.5 overs); Clive Madande 121* (149); Definate Mawadzi 2/2 (1.5 overs) | | 292 (79.1 overs); Brian Bennett 56 (84); Ernest Masuku 4/80 (18.1 overs) |
| 230/5 (67 overs); Taffy Mupariwa 71 (113); Vincent Masekesa 3/76 (21 overs) |

Match drawn
Harare Sports Club, Harare
Umpires: Christopher Phiri & David Shawane
Player of the match: Vincent Masekesa (Mountaineers)

- Matabeleland Tuskers won the toss and elected to bat
- Bad Light prevented any further play on Day 1 (18.3 overs were lost).
- Rain prevented any further play on Day 3.
- Definate Mawadzi and Mashford Shungu (Mountaineers) made their first class debuts.
- Points: Matabeleland Tuskers 12, Mountaineers 13

=== Round 9 ===
10–13 February 2023
Scorecard

| Matabeleland Tuskers | v | Mashonaland Eagles |
| 338 (101.4 overs); Ainsley Ndlovu 84* (119); Wesley Madhevere 3/77 (23 overs) | | 378 (114.5 overs); Faraz Akram 97 (176); Luke Jongwe 4/66 (21 overs) |
| 228/8 (62 overs); Luke Jongwe 91* (121); Faraz Akram 3/15 (9 overs) |

Match drawn
Harare Sports Club, Harare
Umpires: Percival Sizara and Stanley Gogwe
Player of the match: Luke Jongwe (Tuskers)

- Matabeleland Tuskers won the toss and elected to bat.
- Mgcini Dube (Matabeleland Tuskers) made his first-class debut.
- Points: Matabeleland Tuskers 13, Mashonaland Eagles 16

10–13 February 2023
Scorecard

| Southern Rocks | v | Mid West Rhinos |
| 434 (143 overs); Richmond Mutumbami 137 (245); Antum Naqvi 3/73 (40 overs) | | 71/4 (22 overs); Tarisai Musakanda 31* (31); Sydney Murombo 2/14 (7 overs) |

Match drawn
Old Hararians, Harare
Umpires: Ashby Mutumbami and Tafadzwa Musakwa
Player of the match: Richmond Mutumbami (Rocks)

- Southern Rocks won the toss and elected to bat.
- No play was possible on Day 3 & 4 due to rain and wet outfield.
- Alistair Frost (Southern Rocks) made his first-class debut.
- Points: Southern Rocks 10, Mid West Rhinos 9

=== Round 10 ===
29 March–1 April 2023
Scorecard

| Mountaineers | v | Matabeleland Tuskers |
| 320 (86 overs); Definate Mawadzi 78 (99); Tanatswa Bechani 3/57 (14 overs) | | 434 (108.5 overs); Taffy Mupariwa 91 (182); Vincent Masekesa 5/144 (29.5 overs) |
| 401/9d (128 overs); Brian Bennett 104 (182); Tanatswa Bechani 4/133 (39 overs) | | 53/2 (19.4 overs); Nkosana Mpofu 28* (50); Definate Mawadzi 2/14 (7 overs) |

Match Drawn
Old Hararians, Harare
Umpires: Forster Mutizwa & Stanley Gogwe
Player of the match: Tanatswa Bechani (Tuskers)

- Mountaineers won the toss and elected to bat.
- Bad light interrupted play on Day 4 and 16 overs were lost.
- Munashe Chimusoro and Tinotenda Maposa (Matabeleland Tuskers) made their first-class debut.
- Brian Bennet scored his first First-class century.
- Points: Mountaineers 16, Matabeleland Tuskers 17

29 March–1 April 2023
Scorecard

| Mid West Rhinos | v | Southern Rocks |
| 621/9d (139.5 overs); Prince Masvaure 166 (306); Takudzwa Chataira 4/100 (29 overs) | | 203 (54.5 overs); Richmond Mutumbami 68 (66); Brandon Mavuta 5/78 (22.5 overs) |
| | | 227 (75.3 overs) (f/o); Alistair Frost 51 (105); Antum Naqvi 4/47 (23 overs) |

Mid West Rhinos won by an innings and 191 runs
Harare Sports Club, Harare
Umpires: Percival Sizara & Tafadzwa Musakwa
Player of the match: Brandon Mavuta (Rhinos)

- Mid West Rhinos won the toss and elected to bat.
- Jayden Schadendorf (Southern Rocks) made his first-class debut.
- Points: Mid West Rhinos 24, Southern Rocks 6

== Statistics ==
=== Most Runs ===
| Player | Team | Mat | Inns | Runs | Ave | SR | HS | 100 | 50 | 4s | 6s |
|---|---|---|---|---|---|---|---|---|---|---|---|
| Ben Compton | Mountaineers | 5 | 9 | 714 | 79.33 | 65.92 | 217 | 4 | 0 | 92 | 1 |
| Richmond Mutumbami | Southern Rocks | 8 | 14 | 595 | 45.76 | 56.93 | 137 | 2 | 3 | 84 | 6 |
| Nkosana Mpofu | Matabeleland Tuskers | 8 | 15 | 469 | 33.50 | 51.25 | 122 | 1 | 2 | 80 | 1 |
| Tony Munyonga | Mountaineers | 5 | 8 | 391 | 55.85 | 53.56 | 93 | 0 | 4 | 46 | 8 |
| Antum Naqvi | Mid West Rhinos | 5 | 5 | 379 | 94.75 | 66.96 | 140* | 3 | 0 | 43 | 2 |
Source: ESPNCricInfo

=== Most Wickets ===
| Player | Team | Mat | Inns | Wkts | BBI | Avg | Econ | SR | 5w | 10w |
|---|---|---|---|---|---|---|---|---|---|---|
| Tapiwa Mufudza | Matabeleland Tuskers | 8 | 14 | 29 | 4/61 | 26.55 | 2.54 | 62.6 | 0 | 0 |
| Brandon Mavuta | Mid West Rhinos | 6 | 12 | 29 | 6/85 | 30.13 | 3.76 | 48.0 | 3 | 1 |
| Privilege Chesa | Southern Rocks | 7 | 10 | 26 | 6/86 | 27.84 | 4.52 | 36.8 | 3 | 1 |
| Faraz Akram | Mashonaland Eagles | 8 | 14 | 23 | 3/15 | 23.47 | 2.82 | 49.9 | 0 | 0 |
| Ainsley Ndlovu | Matabeleland Tuskers | 7 | 11 | 19 | 4/70 | 33.68 | 2.32 | 86.8 | 0 | 0 |
Source: ESPNCricInfo

== Awards ==
On May 26, 2023, at the end of the season, the following awards were made.

| Award | Recipient | Prize money |
|---|---|---|
| Champions | Mashonaland Eagles | US$7,000 |
| Batter of the Tournament | Richmond Mutumbami | US$1,000 |
| Bowler of the Tournament | Tapiwa Mufudza | US$1,000 |
| Player of The Tournament | Brandon Mavuta | US$2,000 |
