= Zimbabwean cricket team against Afghanistan in the UAE in 2026–27 =

International cricket tour

	Afghanistan	Zimbabwe
- Dates: 27 October – 17 November 2026
Captains	Rahmat Shah (Tests); Ibrahim Zadran (T20Is)	Brian Bennett (Tests); Sikandar Raza (T20Is)

Test series
- Result: Zimbabwe won the 2-match series 1–0
Most runs	Rahmat Shah (233)	Brendan Taylor (382)
Most wickets	Naseer Khan Maroofkhil (9)	Blessing Muzarabani (7); Graeme Cremer (7)
- Player of the series: Brendan Taylor (Zim)

Twenty20 International series
- Results: Afghanistan won the 3-match series 3–0
Most runs	Azmatullah Omarzai (141)	Sikandar Raza (125)
Most wickets	Noor Ahmad (5)	Ernest Masuku (5)
- Player of the series: Azmatullah Omarzai (Afg)

The Zimbabwe cricket team toured the United Arab Emirates in October and November 2026 to play against Afghanistan cricket team. The tour consisted of two Test and three Twenty20 International (T20I) matches. In September 2026, the Afghanistan Cricket Board (ACB) confirmed the fixtures for the tour.

== Squads ==
Afghanistan		Zimbabwe	
Tests	T20Is	Tests	T20Is
Rahmat Shah (c); Ikram Alikhail (vc, wk); Qais Ahmad; Yamin Ahmadzai; Ismat Alam; Sediqullah Atal; Khalil Gurbaz; Abdul Malik; Rahmanullah; Ziaur Rahman; Zia-ur-Rehman; Mohammad Saleem; Hashmatullah Shahidi; Shahidullah; Afsar Zazai (wk)	Ibrahim Zadran (c); Fareed Ahmad; Noor Ahmad; Abdullah Ahmadzai; Ijaz Ahmad Ahmadzai; Mohammad Akram; Sediqullah Atal; Fazalhaq Farooqi; Rahmanullah Gurbaz; Rashid Khan; Azmatullah Omarzai; Mujeeb Ur Rahman; Noor ul Rahman; Shahidullah; Abdullah Tarakhail	Brian Bennett (c); Antum Naqvi; Graeme Cremer; Ben Curran; Blessing Muzarabani; Craig Ervine; Brad Evans; Innocent Kaia; Wessly Madhevere; Tadiwanashe Marumani; Wellington Masakadza; Vincent Masekesa; Ernest Masuku; Kundai Matigimu; Newman Nyamhuri; Brendan Taylor (wk); Tafadzwa Tsiga (wk)	Sikandar Raza (c); Brian Bennett; Ryan Burl; Ben Curran; Brad Evans; Innocent Kaia; Wessly Madhevere; Tadiwanashe Marumani; Wellington Masakadza; Vincent Masekesa; Kundai Matigimu; Blessing Muzarabani; Newman Nyamhuri; Tafadzwa Tsiga

== T20I series ==
=== 1st T20I ===
27 October 2026
18:30 (D/N)
Scorecard

Afghanistan; 177 (19.5 overs)	v	Zimbabwe; 140 (19.1 overs)
Ijaz Ahmad Ahmadzai 52 (22); Newman Nyamhuri 4/31 (3.5 overs)		Ryan Burl 32 (24); Fazalhaq Farooqi 3/13 (3.1 overs)

Afghanistan won by 37 runs
Sharjah Cricket Stadium, Sharjah
Umpires: Farooq Khan (Afg) and Ahmed Shah Pakteen (Afg)
Player of the match: Rashid Khan (Afg)

- Zimbabwe won the toss and elected to field.
- Ernest Masuku (Zim) made his T20I debut.

=== 2nd T20I ===
29 October 2026
18:30 (D/N)
Scorecard

Afghanistan; 221/7 (20 overs)	v	Zimbabwe; 202/5 (20 overs)
Azmatullah Omarzai 116 (50); Brad Evans 2/40 (4 overs)		Sikandar Raza 106* (56); Abdullah Ahmadzai 2/34 (4 overs)

Afghanistan won by 19 runs
Sharjah Cricket Stadium, Sharjah
Umpires: Ahmed Shah Durrani (Afg) and Izatullah Safi (Afg)
Player of the match: Azmatullah Omarzai (Afg)

- Zimbabwe won the toss and elected to field.
- Vincent Masekesa and Tafadzwa Tsiga (Zim) both made their T20I debuts.
- Azmatullah Omarzai (Afg) scored his maiden century in T20Is.
- Rashid Khan (Afg) took his 200th wicket in T20Is, thus becoming the first bowler to achieve this record.

=== 3rd T20I ===
1 November 2026
18:30 (D/N)
Scorecard

Zimbabwe; 79 (14.3 overs)	v	Afghanistan; 81/3 (8.1 overs)
Ryan Burl 30 (29); Noor Ahmad 5/13 (3.3 overs)		Ibrahim Zadran 25* (17); Ernest Masuku 2/21 (2 overs)

Afghanistan won by 7 wickets
Sharjah Cricket Stadium, Sharjah
Umpires: Farooq Khan (Afg) and Ahmed Shah Pakteen (Afg)
Player of the match: Noor Ahmad (Afg)

- Afghanistan won the toss and elected to field.
- Abdullah Tarakhail (Afg) made his T20I debut.
- Noor Ahmad (Afg) took his maiden five-wicket haul in T20Is.

== Test series ==
=== 1st Test ===
5–9 November 2026
Scorecard

Zimbabwe	v	Afghanistan
504 (134.3 overs); Brendan Taylor 131 (168); Mohammad Saleem 3/82 (27.3 overs)		514 (169.4 overs); Rahmat Shah 173 (347); Newman Nyamhuri 5/82 (30.4 overs)
523/5 (122.1 overs); Craig Ervine 206* (279); Zia-ur-Rehman 2/173 (50 overs)

Match drawn
Sharjah Cricket Stadium, Sharjah
Umpires: Jayaraman Madanagopal (Ind) and Rashid Riaz (Pak)
Player of the match: Brendan Taylor (Zim)

- Zimbabwe won the toss and elected to bat.
- Antum Naqvi (Zim) and Rahmanullah (Afg) made their Test debuts.
- Rahmanullah (Afg) scored his maiden century in Tests, becoming the 2nd Afghan batter to score a century on Test debut.
- Newman Nyamhuri (Zim) took his maiden five-wicket haul in Tests.
- Craig Ervine (Zim) scored his 2,000th run and maiden double century in Tests.
- Zimbabwe became the first team to score 500 runs in both innings of a Test match.
- Wessly Madhevere (Zim) scored his maiden century in Tests.

=== 2nd Test ===
13–17 November 2026
Scorecard

Zimbabwe	v	Afghanistan
339 (114.5 overs); Brendan Taylor 119 (217); Naseer Khan Maroofkhil 7/151 (44 overs)		217 (69.4 overs); Afsar Zazai 63 (119); Vincent Masekesa 4/54 (13.4 overs)
295/9d (98 overs); Brendan Taylor 50 (90); Mohammad Saleem 3/78 (21 overs)		360 (130.3 overs); Naseer Khan Maroofkhil 101* (242); Brad Evans 3/55 (27 overs)

Zimbabwe won by 57 runs
Sharjah Cricket Stadium, Sharjah
Umpires: Jayaraman Madanagopal (Ind) and Rashid Riaz (Pak)
Player of the match: Blessing Muzarabani (Zim)

- Zimbabwe won the toss and elected to bat.
- Naseer Khan Maroofkhil took his maiden five-wicket haul in Tests, becoming the 4th Afghan bowler to take a five-wicket haul on debut. He also scored his maiden century in Tests.

== See also ==
- 2026 Afghanistan Tri-Nation Series
