= 2019–20 Logan Cup =

Cricket tournament

- Dates: 12 December 2019 – 16 February 2020
- Administrator(s): Zimbabwe Cricket
- Cricket format: First-class cricket (4 days)
- Tournament format(s): League system
- Participants: 5
- Matches: 20
- Most runs: Neville Madziva (361)
- Most wickets: Tapiwa Mufudza (30)

The 2019–20 Logan Cup was the 26th edition of the Logan Cup, a first-class cricket competition in Zimbabwe. The tournament started on 12 December 2019, and was scheduled to finish on 16 February 2020. It featured five franchise teams, including a new team, the Rangers. Mountaineers were the defending champions.

In July 2019, Zimbabwe Cricket was suspended by the International Cricket Council (ICC) due to government interference, with all their international and domestic fixtures put on hold. The suspension was lifted by the ICC in October 2019, meaning their domestic fixtures could go ahead. However, in early January 2020, three sets of fixtures did not take place as scheduled, with Zimbabwe Cricket not providing a reason. The tournament restarted on 29 January 2020, with the Matabeleland Tuskers playing the Mid West Rhinos in Bulawayo. After a break of nearly one month for the 2019–20 Pro50 Championship, the next first-class matches started on 20 February 2020, with two fixtures in Harare.

On 18 March 2020, Zimbabwe Cricket suspended all forms of cricket in the country due to the COVID-19 pandemic. On 4 May 2020, Zimbabwe Cricket voided the tournament due to the pandemic with no winner being declared.

== Point table ==
The following teams competed:

| Team | Pld | W | L | D | A | Pts |
|---|---|---|---|---|---|---|
| Mashonaland Eagles | 6 | 5 | 1 | 0 | 0 | 28 |
| Mountaineers | 5 | 4 | 1 | 0 | 0 | 23 |
| Matabeleland Tuskers | 6 | 2 | 3 | 1 | 0 | 16 |
| Mid West Rhinos | 5 | 2 | 3 | 0 | 0 | 12 |
| Rangers | 6 | 0 | 5 | 1 | 0 | 4 |

== Fixtures ==
=== December 2019 ===
12–15 December 2019
Scorecard

| Mid West Rhinos | v | Mashonaland Eagles |
| 118 (51.5 overs); Neville Madziva 34 (94); Blessing Muzarabani 3/27 (14 overs) | | 377/9d (99.2 overs); Kudzai Maunze 72 (120); Tendai Chisoro 3/104 (23 overs) |
| 156 (55.5 overs); Prince Masvaure 67* (166); Tinotenda Mutombodzi 4/29 (9.5 overs) |

Mashonaland Eagles won by an innings and 103 runs
Harare Sports Club, Harare
Umpires: Iknow Chabi and Christopher Phiri

- Mashonaland Eagles won the toss and elected to field.
- Bright Matsiwe and Hussain Bhola (Mid West Rhinos) both made their first-class debuts.

12–15 December 2019
Scorecard

| Mountaineers | v | Matabeleland Tuskers |
| 239 (72.4 overs); Wellington Masakadza 70 (152); Ainsley Ndlovu 4/59 (14.4 overs) | | 156 (42.2 overs); Craig Ervine 34 (65); Donald Tiripano 3/37 (11.2 overs) |
| 311/6d (96 overs); Kevin Kasuza 86 (165); Sean Williams 3/49 (23 overs) | | 150 (68.3 overs); Nkosana Mpofu 37 (77); Roy Kaia 5/44 (21 overs) |

Mountaineers won by 244 runs
Old Hararians, Harare
Umpires: Stanley Gogwe and Langton Rusere

- Matabeleland Tuskers won the toss and elected to field.

18–21 December 2019
Scorecard

| Rangers | v | Mashonaland Eagles |
| 221 (80 overs); Brian Mudzinganyama 63 (116); Tinotenda Mutombodzi 5/63 (20 overs) | | 106 (44 overs); Kudzai Maunze 16 (69); Charlton Tshuma 4/28 (12 overs) |
| 214 (66.3 overs); Clive Imbayago 67 (106); Patrick Mambo 4/41 (14 overs) | | 330/9 (89 overs); Tinashe Kamunhukamwe 73 (98); Kyle Jarvis 6/76 (20 overs) |

Mashonaland Eagles won by 1 wicket
Harare Sports Club, Harare
Umpires: Stanley Gogwe and Iknow Chabi

- Mashonaland Eagles won the toss and elected to field.
- Patrick Mambo (Mashonaland Eagles), Brian Mudzinganyama, Tanunurwa Makoni, Marshal Takodza, Clive Imbayago, Johnathan Campbell and Alvin Chiradza (Rangers) all made their first-class debuts.

18–21 December 2019
Scorecard

| Mountaineers | v | Mid West Rhinos |
| 230 (67.4 overs); William Mashinge 60 (115); Carl Mumba 5/51 (17 overs) | | 269 (76 overs); Remembrance Nyathi 105 (218); Roy Kaia 4/47 (18 overs) |
| 352 (80.3 overs); Kevin Kasuza 86 (124); Brandon Mavuta 5/124 (23.3 overs) | | 308 (79 overs); Prince Masvaure 89 (95); Roy Kaia 5/104 (25 overs) |

Mountaineers won by 5 runs
Takashinga Sports Club, Harare
Umpires: Langton Rusere and Christopher Phiri

- Mountaineers won the toss and elected to bat.

27–30 December 2019
Scorecard

| Mid West Rhinos | v | Rangers |
| 144 (55.1 overs); Prince Masvaure 44 (114); Brian Mudzinganyama 4/27 (11 overs) | | 248 (73.5 overs); Brian Mudzinganyama 128 (184); Brandon Mavuta 4/104 (25.5 overs) |
| 320 (103.2 overs); Tendai Chisoro 112 (132); Clive Chitumba 3/53 (16 overs) | | 94 (44.2 overs); Brian Mudzinganyama 22 (52); Tendai Chisoro 7/30 (18.2 overs) |

Mid West Rhinos won by 122 runs
Harare Sports Club, Harare
Umpires: Stanley Gogwe and Christopher Phiri

- Rangers won the toss and elected to field.
- Kudakwashe Macheka (Rangers) made his first-class debut.

27–30 December 2019
Scorecard

| Matabeleland Tuskers | v | Mashonaland Eagles |
| 193 (62.4 overs); Sikandar Raza 71 (78); Tapiwa Mufudza 4/62 (18.4 overs) | | 261 (77.3 overs); Regis Chakabva 115 (138); Sikandar Raza 3/43 (13.3 overs) |
| 241 (80.5 overs); Sikandar Raza 67 (105); Tapiwa Mufudza 5/75 (22 overs) | | 175/3 (32 overs); Tinashe Kamunhukamwe 82 (78); Ainsley Ndlovu 2/37 (10 overs) |

Mashonaland Eagles won by 7 wickets
Takashinga Sports Club, Harare
Umpires: Iknow Chabi and Langton Rusere

- Matabeleland Tuskers won the toss and elected to bat.
- Tinashe Nenhunzi (Mashonaland Eagles) made his first-class debut.

=== January 2020 ===
3–6 January 2020
Scorecard

| Rangers | v | Mountaineers |
| 242 (61.3 overs); Brendan Taylor 143 (159); Victor Nyauchi 4/59 (7.3 overs) | | 254 (82 overs); William Mashinge 64 (164); Charlton Tshuma 4/43 (18 overs) |
| 90 (32.2 overs); Brendan Taylor 25 (39); Donald Tiripano 5/15 (9 overs) | | 84/3 (14.3 overs); Timycen Maruma 37* (27); Charlton Tshuma 1/13 (5 overs) |

Mountaineers won by 7 wickets
Takashinga Sports Club, Harare
Umpires: Forster Mutizwa and Langton Rusere

- Rangers won the toss and elected to bat.

29 January–1 February 2020
Scorecard

| Matabeleland Tuskers | v | Mid West Rhinos |
| 106 (34.4 overs); Luke Jongwe 33 (58); Neville Madziva 3/23 (8 overs) | | 98 (40.3 overs); Nyasha Mayavo 39 (69); Christopher Mpofu 5/16 (13 overs) |
| 225 (60 overs); Luke Jongwe 92 (136); Tendai Chisoro 4/81 (20 overs) | | 201 (52.1 overs); Neville Madziva 117 (145); Christopher Mpofu 6/38 (15.1 overs) |

Matabeleland Tuskers won by 32 runs
Queens Sports Club, Bulawayo
Umpires: Collin Tlou and Trevor Phiri

- Matabeleland Tuskers won the toss and elected to bat.
- Allan Chigoma (Matabeleland Tuskers) made his first-class debut.

=== February 2020 ===
20–23 February 2020
Scorecard

| Mountaineers | v | Mashonaland Eagles |
| 182 (56.1 overs); Richmond Mutumbami 51 (47); Cuthbert Musoko 3/17 (10 overs) | | 307 (95 overs); Tony Munyonga 54 (123); William Mashinge 4/92 (26 overs) |
| 245 (89.2 overs); Gary Chirimuuta 118 (241); Trevor Garwe 4/17 (10 overs) | | 124/4 (30.5 overs); Chamu Chibhabha 49* (60); William Mashinge 3/44 (8.5 overs) |

Mashonaland Eagles won by 6 wickets
Harare Sports Club, Harare
Umpires: Sifelani Rwaziyeni and Iknow Chabi

- Mashonaland Eagles won the toss and elected to field.
- Wesley Madhevere (Mashonaland Eagles) made his first-class debut.

20–23 February 2020
Scorecard

| Rangers | v | Matabeleland Tuskers |
| 128 (48.5 overs); Tanunurwa Makoni 35 (85); John Nyumbu 3/23 (15 overs) | | 232 (80.5 overs); Luke Jongwe 88* (149); Johnathan Campbell 3/50 (16 overs) |
| 151 (44.3 overs); Johnathan Campbell 73* (105); Milton Shumba 4/48 (7.3 overs) | | 51/1 (11 overs); Nkosana Mpofu 23 (29); Davis Murwendo 1/19 (5 overs) |

Matabeleland Tuskers won by 9 wickets
Old Hararians, Harare
Umpires: Walter Musakwa and Christopher Phiri

- Rangers won the toss and elected to bat.
- Daniel Zvidzai (Rangers) made his first-class debut.

26–29 February 2020
Scorecard

| Matabeleland Tuskers | v | Mashonaland Eagles |
| 214 (57.4 overs); Nkosana Mpofu 79 (125); Richard Ngarava 3/42 (13 overs) | | 119 (45.2 overs); Cuthbert Musoko 25 (65); John Nyumbu 3/26 (13.2 overs) |
| 79 (33.4 overs); Nkosana Mpofu 23 (56); Tapiwa Mufudza 4/18 (3.4 overs) | | 177/8 (71.2 overs); Rodney Mupfudza 55* (156); Luke Jongwe 3/26 (10 overs) |

Mashonaland Eagles won by 2 wickets
Harare Sports Club, Harare
Umpires: Tafadzwa Musakwa and Christopher Phiri

- Mashonaland Eagles won the toss and elected to field.
- Rodney Mupfudza and Ashley Mufandauya (Mashonaland Eagles) both made their first-class debuts.

26–29 February 2020
Scorecard

| Mid West Rhinos | v | Rangers |
| 406 (122.5 overs); Remembrance Nyathi 160 (312); Clive Chitumba 4/58 (20 overs) | | 146 (64 overs); Daniel Zvidzai 53 (156); Tafara Chingwara 4/9 (10 overs) |
| | | 89 (28.5 overs) (f/o); Johnathan Campbell 55 (76); Brandon Mavuta 4/25 (8.5 overs) |

Mid West Rhinos won by an innings and 171 runs
Old Hararians, Harare
Umpires: Iknow Chabi and Forster Mutizwa

- Rangers won the toss and elected to field.
- Gregory Liebenberg (Rangers) made his first-class debut.

=== March 2020 ===
3–6 March 2020
Scorecard

| Mountaineers | v | Mashonaland Eagles |
| 464 (139.1 overs); Joylord Gumbie 137 (242); Tony Munyonga 5/99 (36.1 overs) | | 162 (72.5 overs); Rodney Mupfudza 27 (80); William Mashinge 3/23 (16 overs) |
| | | 205 (66.5 overs) (f/o); Cuthbert Musoko 44 (73); Victor Nyauchi 4/32 (13.5 overs) |

Mountaineers won by an innings and 97 runs
Old Hararians, Harare
Umpires: Forster Mutizwa and Christopher Phiri

- Mountaineers won the toss and elected to bat.
- Travor Mutsamba (Mountaineers) and Luke Oldknow (Mashonaland Eagles) both made their first-class debuts.

3–6 March 2020
Scorecard

| Rangers | v | Matabeleland Tuskers |
| 243 (81 overs); Brian Mudzinganyama 68 (124); Ernest Masuku 5/23 (13 overs) | | 292 (113 overs); Milton Shumba 121* (232); Kudakwashe Macheka 3/63 (26 overs) |
| 241 (83.5 overs); Marshal Takodza 60 (161); Steve Chimhamhiwa 3/52 (20 overs) | | 123/3 (14.3 overs); Brian Chari 51 (31); Manson Chikowero 2/15 (3 overs) |

Match drawn
Harare Sports Club, Harare
Umpires: Sifelani Rwaziyeni and Iknow Chabi

- Rangers won the toss and elected to bat.
- Shayne Nxumalo (Matabeleland Tuskers) made his first-class debut.
