= 2025 Zimbabwe Domestic Twenty20 =

Cricket tournament

2025 Zimbabwe Domestic Twenty20 Competition
- Dates: 24 – 30 March 2025
- Administrator: Zimbabwe Cricket
- Cricket format: Twenty20
- Tournament format(s): Single-round robin and final
- Host: Zimbabwe
- Champions: Rhinos (1st title)
- Runners-up: Eagles
- Participants: 5
- Matches: 11
- Most runs: Tadiwanashe Marumani (Eagles) (266)
- Most wickets: Brad Evans (Rhinos) (15)

The 2024-25 Zimbabwe Domestic Twenty20 Competition was the 14th edition of the Zimbabwe Domestic Twenty20 Competition, a domestic Twenty20 cricket league that played in Zimbabwe. The tournament took place from the 24 to 30 March 2025. Five franchise teams playing in a Single-round robin format and top two teams qualify for the final. The final was played between the Mid West Rhinos and the Mashonaland Eagles, with the Rhinos clinching their first ever Zimbabwe Domestic Twenty20 Competition.

== Team and standings ==
=== Points table ===
Pos	Team	Pld	W	L	NR	Pts	NRR
1	Rhinos (C)	4	4	0	0	8	1.355
2	Eagles	4	3	1	0	6	1.668
3	Rocks	4	2	2	0	4	0.053
4	Mountaineers	4	1	3	0	2	−0.800
5	Tuskers	4	0	4	0	0	−2.100

Source: ESPNcricinfo
(C) Champions

Advanced to the Final

=== Match summary ===
Team	Group matches				Play-offs
Team	1	2	3	4	Final
Eagles	2	4	4	6	L
Mountaineers	0	0	2	2	—
Rhinos	2	4	6	8	W
Rocks	0	2	2	4	—
Tuskers	0	0	0	0	—

Win	Loss	Tie	No result	Eliminated

- Note: The total points at the end of each group match are listed.
- Note: Click on the points or results to see the match summary.

== League stage ==
Match 1
24 March 2025
13:30
Scorecard

Tuskers; 133/8 (20 overs)	v	Eagles; 135/2 (13.1 overs)
Taffy Mupariwa 37 (27); Kundai Matigimu 3/21 (4 overs)		Tadiwanashe Marumani 55 (33); Ainsley Ndlovu 2/29 (4 overs)

Eagles won by 8 wickets
Harare Sports Club, Harare
Umpires: Forster Mutizwa and Percival Sizara
Player of the match: Tadiwanashe Marumani (Eagles)

- Eagles won the toss and elected to field.
- Munashe Chimusoro, Brandon James, Raymomd Kasimo (Tuskers) and Kundai Matigimu (Eagles) all made their T20 debuts.

Match 2
24 March 2025
18:30 (N)
Scorecard

Rhinos; 164/8 (20 overs)	v	Mountaineers; 141 (19.4 overs)
Nyasha Mayavo 34* (20); Victor Nyauchi 3/24 (4 overs)		Brian Bennett 70 (52); Hendrichs Macheke 4/22 (4 overs)

Rhinos won by 23 runs
Harare Sports Club, Harare
Umpires: Iknow Chabi and Tafadzwa Musakwa
Player of the match: Hendrichs Macheke (Rhinos)

- Rhinos won the toss and elected to bat.
- Hendrichs Macheke (Rhinos), Fortune Mhlanga and Ashley Mufandauya (Mountaineers) all made their T20 debuts.

Match 3
25 March 2025
13:30
Scorecard

Tuskers; 169/5 (20 overs)	v	Rhinos; 127 (20 overs)
Ryan Burl 37 (28); Ainsley Ndlovu 3/15 (3 overs)		Luke Jongwe 34 (27); Hendrichs Macheke 3/26 (2 overs)

Rhinos won by 42 runs
Harare Sports Club, Harare
Umpires: Christopher Phiri and Langton Rusere
Player of the match: Ryan Burl (Rhinos)

- Mid West Rhinos won the toss and elected to bat.

Match 4
25 March 2025
18:30 (N)
Scorecard

Rocks; 150/6 (20 overs)	v	Eagles; 154/1 (16 overs)
Sikandar Raza 55* (35); Tinotenda Maposa 2/22 (4 overs)		Tadiwanashe Marumani 71 (47); Newman Nyamhuri 1/33 (4 overs)

Eagles won by 9 wickets
Harare Sports Club, Harare
Umpires: Sarah Dambanevana and Tafadzwa Musakwa
Player of the match: Tinashe Kamunhukamwe (Eagles)

- Eagles won the toss and elected to field.
- Newman Nyamhuri and Shelton Mazvitorera (Rocks) both made their T20 debuts.

Match 5
26 March 2025
09:30
Scorecard

Rocks; 181/8 (20 overs)	v	Mountaineers; 118 (19.1 overs)
Sikandar Raza 55 (30); Tendai Chatara 3/49 (4 overs)		Brian Bennett 46 (36); Newman Nyamhuri 3/16 (4 overs)

Rocks won by 63 runs
Harare Sports Club, Harare
Umpires: Christopher Phiri and Forster Mutizwa
Player of the match: Sikandar Raza (Rocks)

- Mountaineers won the toss and elected to field.
- Panashe Taruvinga (Rocks) made his T20 debut.

Match 6
26 March 2025
13:45
Scorecard

Eagles; 197/5 (20 overs)	v	Rhinos; 186 (19.4 overs)
Ryan Burl 77 (50); Kundai Matigimu 2/53 (4 overs)		Tadiwanashe Marumani 95 (57); Brad Evans 4/38 (4 overs)

Rhinos won by 11 runs
Harare Sports Club, Harare
Umpires: Iknow Chabi and Langton Rusere
Player of the match: Ryan Burl (Rhinos)

- Rhinos won the toss and elected to bat.
- Victor Chirwa (Rhinos) made his T20 debut.

Match 7
28 March 2025
09:30
Scorecard

Mountaineers; 201/4 (20 overs)	v	Tuskers; 145/9 (20 overs)
Nick Welch 81 (42); Brandon James 2/26 (3 overs)		Brian Chari 53 (37); Tendai Chatara 4/21 (4 overs)

Mountaineers won by 56 runs
Takashinga Cricket Club, Highfield, Harare
Umpires: Iknow Chabi and Stanley Gogwe
Player of the match: Nick Welch (Mountaineers)

- Tuskers won the toss and elected to field.
- Nkosibongwe Gogodo (Tuskers) made his T20 debut.

Match 8
28 March 2025
13:45
Scorecard

Rocks; 122 (18.5 overs)	v	Rhinos; 123/3 (16.2 overs)
Tafadzwa Tsiga 36 (31); Michael Chinouya 5/24 (4 overs)		Antum Naqvi 29* (21); Roy Kaia 1/20 (3.2 overs)

Rhinos won by 7 wickets
Takashinga Cricket Club, Highfield, Harare
Umpires: Forster Mutizwa and David Shawane
Player of the match: Michael Chinouya (Rhinos)

- Rhinos won the toss and elected to field.

Match 9
29 March 2025
13:30
Scorecard

Eagles; 192/6 (20 overs)	v	Mountaineers; 158/8 (20 overs)
Dion Myers 67* (50); Brian Bennett 2/19 (2 overs)		Alistair Frost 37* (23); Wesley Madhevere 2/18 (4 overs)

Eagles won by 34 runs
Harare Sports Club, Harare
Umpires: Tafadzwa Musakwa and Langton Rusere
Player of the match: Dion Myers (Eagles)

- Mountaineers won the toss and elected to field.

Match 10
29 March 2025
18:30 (N)
Scorecard

Tuskers; 158/5 (20 overs)	v	Rocks; 159/4 (19.3 overs)
Brian Chari 76 (59); Dylan Hondo 3/17 (4 overs)		Tafadzwa Tsiga 69* (49); Tanatswa Bechani 2/25 (4 overs)

Rocks won by 6 wickets
Harare Sports Club, Harare
Umpires: Iknow Chabi and Stanley Gogwe
Player of the match: Tafadzwa Tsiga (Rocks)

- Tuskers won the toss and elected to bat.
- Matthew Campbell (Rocks) made his T20 debut.

== Final ==
Final
30 March 2025
13:30
Scorecard

Rhinos; 174/9 (20 overs)	v	Eagles; 125/9 (20 overs)
Antum Naqvi 50 (32); Richard Ngarava 2/15 (4 overs)		Craig Ervine 21 (19); Brad Evans 2/16 (4 overs)

Rhinos won by 49 runs
Harare Sports Club, Harare
Umpires: Iknow Chabi and Langton Rusere
Player of the match: Antum Naqvi (Rhinos)

- Rhinos won the toss and elected to bat.
