= South Africa Emerging cricket team in Zimbabwe in 2024 =

International cricket tour

South Africa Emerging Players tour of Zimbabwe in 2024
| | Zimbabwe Emerging | South Africa Emerging |
- Dates: 1 – 17 August 2024
| Captains | Takudzwanashe Kaitano | Mihlali Mpongwana |

FC series
- Result: South Africa Emerging won the 2 (unofficial)-match series 1–0
| Most runs | Antum Naqvi (235) | Lesego Senokwane (315) |
| Most wickets | Antum Naqvi (6) | Jade de Klerk (9) |

LA series
- Result: Zimbabwe Emerging won the 3 (unofficial)-match series 2–1
| Most runs | Emmanuel Bawa (154) | Lesego Senokwane (146) |
| Most wickets | Brandon Mavuta (6) | Andile Mokgakane (5); Dian Forrester (5) |

The South Africa Emerging Players toured Zimbabwe in August 2024 to play the Zimbabwe Emerging Players. The tour consist of three List A and two first-class matches (without List A and First-class status).

== Squads ==
| Zimbabwe Emerging Players | South Africa Emerging Players |
|---|---|
| Takudzwanashe Kaitano (c); Alistair Frost; Innocent Kaia; Ryan Kamwemba (wk); Takudzwanashe Kaitano; Brandon Mavuta; Carl Mumba; Kudakwashe Macheka; Larvet Masunda; Tapiwa Mufudza; Nyasha Mayavo (wk); Tinashe Muchawaya; Tinaye Muzonde; Awad Naqvi; Ronak Patel; Arinesto Vezha; Nick Welch | Mihlali Mpongwana (c); Jade de Klerk; Dian Forrester; Valentine Kitime; Tristan Luus; Dewan Marais; Litheko Modiri; Andile Mogakane; Nipho Mpungose; Caleb Seleka; Lesego Senokwane; Andile Simelane; Codi Yusuf; Ntando Zuma (wk) |

== Four-day series ==
=== 1st four-day match ===
1–4 August 2024
Scorecard

| Zimbabwe Emerging | v | South Africa Emerging |
| 216 (69.3 overs); Ernest Masuku 56 (86); Tristan Luus 4/34 (16 overs) | | 586/6d (136.1 overs); Dian Forrester 147 (219); Tapiwa Mufudza 3/159 (39.1 overs) |
| 184 (80.2 overs); Alistair Frost 36 (91); Jade de Klerk 5/57 (27 overs) |

South Africa Emerging won by an innings and 186 runs
Queens Sports Club, Bulawayo
Umpires: Christopher Phiri (Zim) and Langton Rusere (Zim)
Player of the match: Dian Forrester (South Africa Emerging)

- Zimbabwe Emerging won the toss and elected to bat.

=== 2nd four-day match ===
7–10 August 2024
Scorecard

| Zimbabwe Emerging | v | South Africa Emerging |
| 399 (119.1 overs); Antum Naqvi 130 (213); Andile Mokgakane 4/56 (20 overs) | | 595 (125.1 overs); Lesego Senokwane 280 (375); Antum Naqvi 6/128 (24.1 overs) |
| 217/4 (80 overs); Takudzwanashe Kaitano 77 (203); Jade de Klerk 2/49 (22 overs) |

Match drawn
Queens Sports Club, Bulawayo
Umpires: Nkosehle Ndiweni (Zim) and Percival Sizara (Zim)
Player of the match: Antum Naqvi (Zimbabwe Emerging)

- Zimbabwe Emerging won the toss and elected to bat.

== 50-overs series ==
=== 1st 50-overs match ===
13 August 2024
09:15
Scorecard

| Zimbabwe Emerging; 235 (49.5 overs) | v | South Africa Emerging; 237/3 (37.5 overs) |
| Alistair Frost 63 * (76); Dian Forrester 3/28 (7.5 overs) | | Lesego Senokwane 89 (78); Tapiwa Mufudza 3/34 (10 overs) |

South Africa Emerging won by 7 wickets
Queens Sports Club, Bulawayo
Umpires: Iknow Chabi (Zim) and Percival Sizara (Zim)
Player of the match: Dian Forrester (South Africa Emerging)

- South Africa Emerging won the toss and elected to field.

=== 2nd 50-overs match ===
15 August 2024
09:15
Scorecard

| Zimbabwe Emerging; 310/9 (50 overs) | v | South Africa Emerging; 311/6 (45.3 overs) |
| Antum Naqvi 85 (81); Jade De Klerk 3/45 (10 overs) | | Andile Simelane 110 (70); Antum Naqvi 3/68 (10 overs) |

South Africa Emerging won by 4 wickets
Queens Sports Club, Bulawayo
Umpires: Foster Mutizwa (Zim) and Christopher Phiri (Zim)
Player of the match: Andile Simelane (South Africa Emerging)

- South Africa Emerging won the toss and elected to field.

=== 3rd 50-overs match ===
17 August 2024
09:15
Scorecard

| Zimbabwe Emerging; 177 (46.3 overs) | v | South Africa Emerging; 174 (40.5 overs) |
| Emmanuel Bawa 60 (80); Andile Mokgakane 5/22 (5 overs) | | Modiri Litheko 53 (52); Brandon Mavuta 6/39 (9.5 overs) |

Zimbabwe Emerging won by 3 runs
Queens Sports Club, Bulawayo
Umpires: Forster Mutizwa and Christopher Phiri
Player of the match: Brandon Mavuta (Zimbabwe Emerging)

- Zimbabwe Emerging won the toss and elected to bat.
