= South African cricket team in Zimbabwe in 2025 =

International cricket tour

South Africa cricket team in Zimbabwe in 2025
	Zimbabwe	South Africa
- Dates: 28 June – 10 July 2025
Captains	Craig Ervine	Keshav Maharaj (1st Test); Wiaan Mulder (2nd Test)

Test series
- Result: South Africa won the 2-match series 2–0
Most runs	Sean Williams (257)	Wiaan Mulder (531)
Most wickets	Tanaka Chivanga (8)	Corbin Bosch (10); Codi Yusuf (10)
- Player of the series: Wiaan Mulder (SA)

The South Africa cricket team toured Zimbabwe in June and July 2025 to play the Zimbabwe cricket team. The tour consisted of two Test matches, followed by a tri-nation T20I series also involving New Zealand. In March 2025, the Zimbabwe Cricket (ZC) confirmed the fixtures for the tour, as a part of the 2025 home international season.

== Squads ==
Zimbabwe	South Africa
Craig Ervine (c); Brian Bennett; Tanaka Chivanga; Trevor Gwandu; Takudzwanashe Kaitano; Wessly Madhevere; Clive Madande (wk); Vincent Masekesa; Wellington Masakadza; Prince Masvaure; Kundai Matigimu; Blessing Muzarabani; Dion Myers (Note: In squad for second Test only); Newman Nyamhuri; Tafadzwa Tsiga (wk); Nick Welch; Sean Williams	Keshav Maharaj (c); ~~Temba Bavuma (c)~~; David Bedingham; Corbin Bosch; Matthew Breetzke (wk); Dewald Brevis; Tony de Zorzi; Zubayr Hamza; Kwena Maphaka; Wiaan Mulder; Senuran Muthusamy; Lhuan-dre Pretorius (wk); Lesego Senokwane; Prenelan Subrayen; Kyle Verreynne (wk); Codi Yusuf

On 20 June, Temba Bavuma was ruled out of the series due to hamstring strain, with Keshav Maharaj named as the captain. On 2 July, Keshav Maharaj was ruled out from second test due to groin strain and was replaced by Senuran Muthusamy and Wiaan Mulder was announced as captain. Lungi Ngidi who was earlier included in the squad was also released to give further opportunities to pacers who impressed in the first Test.

On 5 July, Prince Masvaure was ruled out of the second Test due to injury, with Dion Myers named his replacement.

== Test series ==
=== 1st Test ===
28 June–1 July 2025
Scorecard

South Africa	v	Zimbabwe
418/9d (90 overs); Lhuan-dre Pretorius 153 (160); Tanaka Chivanga 4/83 (16 overs)		251 (67.4 overs); Sean Williams 137 (164); Wiaan Mulder 4/50 (16 overs)
369 (82.5 overs); Wiaan Mulder 147 (206); Wellington Masakadza 4/98 (22 overs)		208 (66.2 overs); Wellington Masakadza 57 (92); Corbin Bosch 5/43 (12 overs)

South Africa won by 328 runs
Queens Sports Club, Bulawayo
Umpires: Richard Illingworth (Eng) and Jayaraman Madanagopal (Ind)
Player of the match: Lhuan-dre Pretorius (SA)

- South Africa won the toss and elected to bat.
- Dewald Brevis, Lhuan-dre Pretorius and Codi Yusuf (SA) all made their Test debuts.
- Keshav Maharaj (SA) captained South Africa for the first time in Tests.
- Lhuan-dre Pretorius (SA) scored his maiden century in Tests. He became the youngest South African to score a Test century and the youngest cricketer to score 150.
- Corbin Bosch (SA) scored his maiden century in Tests.
- Prince Masvaure (Zim) replaced Brian Bennett as a concussion substitute during the Zimbabwe's first innings of the match.
- Keshav Maharaj (SA) took his 200th wicket in Tests, becoming South Africa's first spinner to reach this milestone.
- Corbin Bosch (SA) took his first five-wicket haul in Tests.

=== 2nd Test ===
6–8 July 2025
Scorecard

South Africa	v	Zimbabwe
626/5d (114 overs); Wiaan Mulder 367* (334); Tanaka Chivanga 2/112 (24 overs)		170 (43 overs); Sean Williams 83* (55); Prenelan Subrayen 4/42 (10 overs)
		220 (77.3 overs) (f/o); Nick Welch 55 (126); Corbin Bosch 4/38 (19 overs)

South Africa won by an innings and 236 runs
Queens Sports Club, Bulawayo
Umpires: Richard Illingworth (Eng) and Jayaraman Madanagopal (Ind)
Player of the match: Wiaan Mulder (SA)

- Zimbabwe won the toss and elected to field.
- Kundai Matigimu (Zim), Lesego Senokwane and Prenelan Subrayen (SA) all made their Test debuts.
- Wiaan Mulder (SA) captained South Africa for the first time in Tests.
- Wiaan Mulder (SA) scored his first triple century in Tests and broke Hashim Amla's (311*) record for the highest individual score by a South African in Tests.
- Wiaan Mulder (SA) scored his 1000th run in Tests.
