= Old Georgians Sports Club =

Cricket ground in Harare, Zimababwe

- Interactive map of Old Georgians Sports Club

Ground information
- Location: Harare, Mashonaland, Zimbabwe
- Country: Zimbabwe
- Coordinates: 17.7742°S 31.0658°E
- Establishment: c. 1992

Team information
Eagles	(2019/20)
- As of 4 February 2022; Source: Ground profile

The Old Georgians Sports Club is a sports club in Harare. Its facilities include a cricket ground. The cricket ground played host to one first-class cricket match in October 1992, when Zimbabwe B played the touring New Zealanders, which saw the New Zealanders Dipak Patel (5 for 54) and Simon Doull (6 for 37) taking five wicket hauls, and Mark Greatbatch scoring a century. In the same month the ground hosted its first List A one-day match when the Zimbabwe Cricket Union President's XI played the touring Indians, who were touring Zimbabwe to take part in the Zimbabwe's first Test series. The ground later held two one-day matches in the 2000 ICC Emerging Nations Tournament, with the Netherlands playing Ireland and Kenya, though the match against Ireland was called off due to a poor outfield and uneven pitch. After a gap of nearly 20 years, the last one-day match to be played there came in the 2019–20 Pro50 Championship when the Eagles played the Rangers.

== Records ==
=== List A ===
- Highest team total: 252 for 6 by Eagles v Rangers, 2019–20
- Lowest team total: 141 all out by Rangers v Eagles, as above
- Highest individual innings: 73 by Ravi Shastri for Indians v Zimbabwe Cricket Union President's XI, 1992–93
- Best bowling in an innings: 4-28 by Wesley Madhevere for Eagles v Rangers, 2019–20

== See also ==
- List of cricket grounds in Zimbabwe
