= Nkosana =

Nkosana is a masculine African given name which means prince. Notable people with the name include:

- Nkosana Makate (born 1977), South African businessman
- Nkosana Mpofu (born 1990), Zimbabwean first-class cricketer
