= Owen Muzondo =

Zimbabwean cricketer (born 1998)

Personal information
- Born: 19 February 1998 (age 28); Belvedere Maternity, Zimbabwe
- Batting: Left-handed
- Bowling: Slow left arm orthodox

Domestic team information
- Years: Team
- 2023-present: Mashonaland Eagles
Medal record
Representing Zimbabwe
Men's Cricket
African Games
Gold medal – first place	2023 Accra	Team
- Source: Cricinfo, 7 December 2024

Owen Muzondo (born 19 February 1998) is a Zimbabwean cricketer.

== Career ==
He made his first-class debut for Mashonaland Eagles against Mountaineers on 21 January 2023 during the 2022–23 Logan Cup. He made his List A debut for Mashonaland Eagles against Southern Rocks on 22 October 2023 during the 2023–24 Pro50 Championship. He made his T20 debut for Mashonaland Eagles against Matabeleland Tuskers on 3 March 2024 during the final of the 2023–24 Zimbabwe Domestic Twenty20 Competition.

In March 2024, he was included in Zimbabwe's contingent for the 2023 African Games and he represented Zimbabwe Emerging Team in the men's cricket tournament at the 2023 African Games. Zimbabwe eventually claimed gold medal in the African Games cricket tournament defeating Namibia by 8 wickets in the final.
