= Oliver Gibson =

Oliver Gibson may refer to:

- Oliver Gibson (American football) (1972–2025), American football player
- Oliver Gibson (politician) (1934–2018), Northern Irish politician
- Oli Gibson (born 2000), English cricketer
