= Sri Lankan cricket team in Zimbabwe in 2019–20 =

International cricket tour

	Zimbabwe	Sri Lanka
- Dates: 19 – 31 January 2020
Captains	Sean Williams	Dimuth Karunaratne

Test series
- Result: Sri Lanka won the 2-match series 1–0
Most runs	Sean Williams (217)	Angelo Mathews (277)
Most wickets	Sikandar Raza (11)	Lasith Embuldeniya (13)
- Player of the series: Angelo Mathews (SL)

The Sri Lanka cricket team toured Zimbabwe in January 2020 to play two Test matches. It was the first tour of Zimbabwe since the International Cricket Council (ICC) lifted its suspension on Zimbabwe Cricket, due to government interference, in October 2019. Zimbabwe last played Test cricket in November 2018, in a two-match series against Bangladesh. The two teams last played a Test match against each other in July 2017, with Sri Lanka winning by four wickets. Zimbabwe have never beaten Sri Lanka in a Test match. Zimbabwe last played a home Test match in November 2017, against the West Indies.

In December 2019, Sri Lanka Cricket confirmed that the tour would take place following their tour of India. In January 2020, Zimbabwe Cricket confirmed the tour schedule. Zimbabwe Cricket also named Sean Williams as their new Test captain, replacing Hamilton Masakadza who took up the role of Director of Cricket.

Ten days before the first Test, Zimbabwe Cricket named a provisional squad of twenty-five players for the tour. On 15 January 2020, Zimbabwe named their final squad for the tour, which included five players uncapped at Test level. Three of those five cricketers made their debut in the opening day of the first Test of the series, with Brian Mudzinganyama making his Test debut on day four, as a concussion substitute. Mudzinganyama became the first cricketer to make his Test debut as a substitute. Sri Lanka won the match by ten wickets, to take a 1–0 lead in the series. The second Test finished in a draw, therefore Sri Lanka won the series.

== Squads ==
Tests
Zimbabwe	Sri Lanka
Sean Williams (c); Regis Chakabva (wk); Craig Ervine; Kyle Jarvis; Kevin Kasuza; Timycen Maruma; Prince Masvaure; Brian Mudzinganyama; Carl Mumba; Tinotenda Mutombodzi; Ainsley Ndlovu; Victor Nyauchi; Sikandar Raza; Brendan Taylor; Donald Tiripano; Charlton Tshuma	Dimuth Karunaratne (c); Dinesh Chandimal; Niroshan Dickwella (wk); Lasith Embuldeniya; Oshada Fernando; Vishwa Fernando; Lahiru Kumara; Suranga Lakmal; Angelo Mathews; Kusal Mendis; Dilruwan Perera; Kasun Rajitha; Lakshan Sandakan; Dhananjaya de Silva; Lahiru Thirimanne

Tinotenda Mutombodzi was added to Zimbabwe's squad for the second Test as a replacement to Kyle Jarvis, who was ruled out due to an injury.

== Test series ==
=== 1st Test ===
19–23 January 2020
Scorecard

Zimbabwe	v	Sri Lanka
358 (148 overs); Craig Ervine 85 (187); Lasith Embuldeniya 5/114 (42 overs)		515/9d (176.2 overs); Angelo Mathews 200* (468); Sikandar Raza 3/62 (16 overs)
170 (92 overs); Sean Williams 39 (79); Suranga Lakmal 4/27 (20 overs)		14/0 (3 overs); Dimuth Karunaratne 10* (13)

Sri Lanka won by 10 wickets
Harare Sports Club, Harare
Umpires: Marais Erasmus (SA) and Nitin Menon (Ind)
Player of the match: Angelo Mathews (SL)

- Zimbabwe won the toss and elected to bat.
- Kevin Kasuza, Ainsley Ndlovu and Victor Nyauchi (Zim) all made their Test debuts.
- Sean Williams captained Zimbabwe for the first time in Tests.
- Zimbabwe's first three batsmen all scored half-centuries in the first innings, the first time the top three had achieved this for the team in the same innings in Tests.
- Craig Ervine (Zim) scored his 1,000th run in Tests.
- Angelo Mathews (SL) scored his 10th century, and his first double century in Tests.
- Brian Mudzinganyama (Zim) replaced Kevin Kasuza as a concussion substitute during day 4 after 43 overs of Sri Lanka's first innings, with Mudzinganyama making his Test debut.

=== 2nd Test ===
27–31 January 2020
Scorecard

Zimbabwe	v	Sri Lanka
406 (115.3 overs); Sean Williams 107 (137); Lasith Embuldeniya 4/182 (42.3 overs)		293 (119.5 overs); Angelo Mathews 64 (158); Sikandar Raza 7/113 (43 overs)
247/7d (75 overs); Brendan Taylor 67 (75); Vishwa Fernando 2/43 (20 overs)		204/3 (87 overs); Kusal Mendis 116* (233); Carl Mumba 1/13 (4 overs)

Match drawn
Harare Sports Club, Harare
Umpires: Aleem Dar (Pak) and Nitin Menon (Ind)
Player of the match: Sikandar Raza (Zim)

- Zimbabwe won the toss and elected to bat.
- Only 54 overs were bowled on day 4 due to rain and bad light.
- Tinotenda Mutombodzi (Zim) made his Test debut.
- Timycen Maruma (Zim) replaced Kevin Kasuza as a concussion substitute during day 3 at the start of Zimbabwe's second innings.
- Sikandar Raza took the second-best bowling figures in an innings for a Zimbabwe bowler in Tests.
