= Tinotenda Maposa =

Zimbabwean cricketer (born 2003)

Personal information
- Full name: Tinotenda Tinashe Maposa
- Born: 29 August 2003 (age 23); Bulawayo, Zimbabwe
- Batting: Right-handed
- Bowling: Right arm medium

International information
- National side: Zimbabwe
- Only ODI (cap 161): 19 December 2024 v Afghanistan
- T20I debut (cap 80): 5 December 2024 v Pakistan
- Last T20I: 25 November 2025 v Sri Lanka

Domestic team information
- Years: Team
- 2023–present: Matabeleland Tuskers

Career statistics
Competition	ODI	T20I	FC	LA
Matches	1	20	7	6
Runs scored	0	92	174	43
Batting average	0.00	13.14	17.40	7.16
100s/50s	0/0	0/0	0/1	0/0
Top score	0	32	74	19
Balls bowled	10	338	676	225
Wickets	0	14	20	11
Bowling average	–	36.50	22.85	19.18
5 wickets in innings	–	0	2	0
10 wickets in match	–	0	0	0
Best bowling	–	2/33	5/37	4/42
Catches/stumpings	0/–	10/–	1/–	0/–
- Source: Cricinfo, 2 January 2026

Tinotenda Tinashe Maposa (born 29 August 2003) is a Zimbabwean cricketer who plays for Zimbabwe cricket team and Matabeleland Tuskers in domestic cricket. He made his senior international debut in December 2024.

== Career ==
He made his first-class debut for Matabeleland Tuskers against Mountaineers on 29 March 2023 during the 2022–23 Logan Cup. He was included in Matabeleland Tuskers squad for the 2023–24 Zimbabwe Domestic Twenty20 Competition which was played in March 2024. He was retained by Matabeleland Tuskers ahead of the 2023–24 Logan Cup and 2024–25 Logan Cup.

In October 2024, he was named in Zimbabwe's squad for the 2024 Men's T20 World Cup Africa Sub-regional Qualifier B which was held in Kenya. He made his List A debut for Mashonaland Eagles against Matabeleland Tuskers on 5 November 2024 during the 2024–25 Pro50 Championship.

In November 2024, he was named in Zimbabwe's squad to face off Pakistan in a three match bilateral home ODI series. He made his T20 debut as well as his Twenty20 International (T20I) debut against Pakistan on 5 December 2024 during the final T20I of the three match bilateral series between Zimbabwe and Pakistan. Tinotenda having never played a professional T20 match before, walked into the crease at number nine position during Zimbabwe's 19th over of the batting innings, as Zimbabwe were reeling at precarious position at 120/7, further needing 13 runs to win in 7 deliveries in order to chase down a target of 134, albeit a low scoring affair. He played a blistering innings with a late blitz into the final over of the match by taking on the opposition with a fearless temperament, scoring all of the winning runs in the final over to seal Zimbabwe a thrilling consolation win after having already lost the series 1-2. Tinotenda smashed a boundary and a six in his unbeaten innings of 12 which came at a strike rate of 300 to push Zimbabwe ever so close to the target, defying the odds and pressure of being a novice at the crease with zero exposure to international cricket.
