= Zimbabwean cricket team in Bangladesh in 2024 =

International cricket tour

Zimbabwe men's cricket team in Bangladesh in 2024
	Bangladesh	Zimbabwe
- Dates: 3 – 12 May 2024
Captains	Najmul Hossain Shanto	Sikandar Raza

Twenty20 International series
- Results: Bangladesh won the 5-match series 4–1
Most runs	Tanzid Hasan (160)	Brian Bennett (135)
Most wickets	Taskin Ahmed (8); Mohammad Saifuddin (8)	Blessing Muzarabani (7)
- Player of the series: Taskin Ahmed (Ban)

The Zimbabwe men's cricket team toured Bangladesh in May 2024 to play five Twenty20 International (T20I) matches. The tour originally had two Tests as well along with the five T20Is. However, in March 2024, the Test series was postponed to 2025. The T20I matches formed part of Bangladesh's preparation for the 2024 ICC Men's T20 World Cup. In March 2024, Bangladesh Cricket Board (BCB) confirmed the fixtures for the tour. At the end of the series, Zimbabwe cricketer Sean Williams announced his retirement from T20I cricket.

== Squads ==
Bangladesh	Zimbabwe
Najmul Hossain Shanto (c); Taskin Ahmed; Shakib Al Hasan; Jaker Ali (wk); Liton Das (wk); Mahedi Hasan; Tanzid Hasan; Parvez Hossain Emon; Afif Hossain; Rishad Hossain; Tawhid Hridoy; Shoriful Islam; Tanvir Islam; Mahmudullah; Mustafizur Rahman; Mohammad Saifuddin; Tanzim Hasan Sakib; Soumya Sarkar	Sikandar Raza (c); Faraz Akram; Brian Bennett; Ryan Burl; Johnathan Campbell; Craig Ervine; Joylord Gumbie (wk); Luke Jongwe; Clive Madande (wk); Tadiwanashe Marumani; Wellington Masakadza; Blessing Muzarabani; Ainsley Ndlovu; Richard Ngarava; Sean Williams

For the last two T20Is, Shakib Al Hasan, Mustafizur Rahman and Soumya Sarkar replaced Parvez Hossain Emon, Afif Hossain and Shoriful Islam in Bangladesh's squad.

== T20I series ==
=== 1st T20I ===
3 May 2024
18:00 (N)
Scorecard

Zimbabwe; 124 (20 overs)	v	Bangladesh; 126/2 (15.2 overs)
Clive Madande 43 (39); Taskin Ahmed 3/14 (4 overs)		Tanzid Hasan 67* (47); Luke Jongwe 1/14 (1.2 overs)

Bangladesh won by 8 wickets
Zohur Ahmed Chowdhury Stadium, Chattogram
Umpires: Tanvir Ahmed (Ban) and Masudur Rahman (Ban)
Player of the match: Taskin Ahmed (Ban)

- Bangladesh won the toss and elected to field.
- Tanzid Hasan (Ban) and Joylord Gumbie (Zim) both made their T20I debuts.

=== 2nd T20I ===
5 May 2024
18:00 (N)
Scorecard

Zimbabwe; 138/7 (20 overs)	v	Bangladesh; 142/4 (18.3 overs)
Johnathan Campbell 45* (24); Taskin Ahmed 2/18 (4 overs)		Tawhid Hridoy 37* (25); Luke Jongwe 2/35 (4 overs)

Bangladesh won by 6 wickets
Zohur Ahmed Chowdhury Stadium, Chattogram
Umpires: Masudur Rahman (Ban) and Sharfuddoula (Ban)
Player of the match: Tawhid Hridoy (Ban)

- Bangladesh won the toss and elected to field.
- Johnathan Campbell (Zim) made his T20I debut.

=== 3rd T20I ===
7 May 2024
15:00
Scorecard

Bangladesh; 165/5 (20 overs)	v	Zimbabwe; 156/9 (20 overs)
Towhid Hridoy 57 (38); Blessing Muzarabani 3/14 (4 overs)		Faraz Akram 34* (19); Mohammad Saifuddin 3/42 (4 overs)

Bangladesh won by 9 runs
Zohur Ahmed Chowdhury Stadium, Chattogram
Umpires: Morshed Ali Khan (Ban) and Sharfuddoula (Ban)
Player of the match: Tawhid Hridoy (Ban)

- Zimbabwe won the toss and elected to field.

=== 4th T20I ===
10 May 2024
18:00 (N)
Scorecard

Bangladesh; 143 (19.5 overs)	v	Zimbabwe; 138 (19.4 overs)
Tanzid Hasan 52 (37); Luke Jongwe 3/20 (3 overs)		Johnathan Campbell 31 (27); Shakib Al Hasan 4/35 (3.4 overs)

Bangladesh won by 5 runs
Sher-e-Bangla National Cricket Stadium, Dhaka
Umpires: Sharfuddoula (Ban) and Gazi Sohel (Ban)
Player of the match: Mustafizur Rahman (Ban)

- Zimbabwe won the toss and elected to field.

=== 5th T20I ===
12 May 2024
10:00
Scorecard

Bangladesh; 157/6 (20 overs)	v	Zimbabwe; 158/2 (18.3 overs)
Mahmudullah 54 (44); Blessing Muzarabani 2/22 (4 overs)		Sikandar Raza 72* (46); Shakib Al Hasan 1/9 (4 overs)

Zimbabwe won by 8 wickets
Sher-e-Bangla National Cricket Stadium, Dhaka
Umpires: Tanvir Ahmed (Ban) and Sharfuddoula (Ban)
Player of the match: Brian Bennett (Zim)

- Zimbabwe won the toss and elected to field.
