= Pakistani cricket team in Zimbabwe in 2024–25 =

International cricket tour

	Zimbabwe	Pakistan
- Dates: 24 November – 5 December 2024
Captains	Craig Ervine (ODIs); Sikandar Raza (T20Is)	Mohammad Rizwan (ODIs); Salman Ali Agha (T20Is)

One Day International series
- Results: Pakistan won the 3-match series 2–1
Most runs	Sean Williams (78)	Saim Ayub (155)
Most wickets	Sikandar Raza (4)	Abrar Ahmed (6); Salman Ali Agha (6)
- Player of the series: Saim Ayub (Pak)

Twenty20 International series
- Results: Pakistan won the 3-match series 2–1
Most runs	Brian Bennett (70)	Saim Ayub (60); Tayyab Tahir (60)
Most wickets	Ryan Burl (2); Wellington Masakadza (2); Richard Ngarava (2); Blessing Muzarabani (2)	Sufiyan Muqeem (9)
- Player of the series: Sufiyan Muqeem (Pak)

The Pakistan cricket team toured Zimbabwe in November and December 2024 to play the Zimbabwe cricket team. The tour consisted of three One Day International (ODI) and three Twenty20 International (T20I) matches. In July 2024, the Zimbabwe Cricket (ZC) confirmed the fixtures for the tour.

== Squads ==
Zimbabwe		Pakistan	
ODIs	T20Is	ODIs	T20Is
Craig Ervine (c); Faraz Akram; Brian Bennett; Joylord Gumbie (wk); Trevor Gwandu; Clive Madande (wk); Tinotenda Maposa; Tadiwanashe Marumani (wk); Brandon Mavuta; Tashinga Musekiwa; Blessing Muzarabani; Dion Myers; Richard Ngarava; Sikandar Raza; Sean Williams	Sikandar Raza (c); Faraz Akram; Brian Bennett; Ryan Burl; Trevor Gwandu; Clive Madande (wk); Wessly Madhevere; Tinotenda Maposa; Tadiwanashe Marumani (wk); Wellington Masakadza; Brandon Mavuta; Tashinga Musekiwa; Blessing Muzarabani; Dion Myers; Richard Ngarava	Mohammad Rizwan (c, wk); Salman Ali Agha (vc); Abbas Afridi; Abrar Ahmed; Faisal Akram; Saim Ayub; ~~Shahnawaz Dahani~~; ~~Ahmed Daniyal~~; Kamran Ghulam; Mohammad Hasnain; Aamir Jamal; Haseebullah Khan (wk); Irfan Khan; Jahandad Khan; Haris Rauf; Abdullah Shafique; Tayyab Tahir	Salman Ali Agha (c); Abbas Afridi; Qasim Akram; Saim Ayub; ~~Ahmed Daniyal~~; Sahibzada Farhan; Mohammad Hasnain; Aamir Jamal; Haseebullah Khan (wk); Irfan Khan; Jahandad Khan; Usman Khan; Arafat Minhas; Sufiyan Muqeem; Haris Rauf; Omair Yousuf; Tayyab Tahir

On 27 November, Ahmed Daniyal and Shahnawaz Dahani were ruled out of the third ODI due hamstring injury and left ankle injury respectively, with Jahandad Khan and Abbas Afridi added to the squad while Ahmed Daniyal was also ruled out of the T20I series and Aamir Jamal named as his replacement.

== ODI series ==
=== 1st ODI ===
24 November 2024
09:30
Scorecard

Zimbabwe; 205 (40.2 overs)	v	Pakistan; 60/6 (21 overs)
Richard Ngarava 48 (52); Faisal Akram 3/24 (8 overs)		Mohammad Rizwan 19* (43); Sikandar Raza 2/7 (3 overs)

Zimbabwe won by 80 runs (DLS method)
Queens Sports Club, Bulawayo
Umpires: Iknow Chabi (Zim) and Michael Gough (Eng)
Player of the match: Sikandar Raza (Zim)

- Pakistan won the toss and elected to field.
- No further play was possible due to rain.
- Brian Bennett, Trevor Gwandu (Zim), Faisal Akram, Aamir Jamal and Haseebullah Khan (Pak) all made their ODI debuts.

=== 2nd ODI ===
26 November 2024
09:30
Scorecard

Zimbabwe; 145 (32.3 overs)	v	Pakistan; 148/0 (18.2 overs)
Dion Myers 33 (30); Abrar Ahmed 4/33 (8 overs)		Saim Ayub 113* (62)

Pakistan won by 10 wickets
Queens Sports Club, Bulawayo
Umpires: Michael Gough (Eng) and Forster Mutizwa (Zim)
Player of the match: Saim Ayub (Pak)

- Zimbabwe won the toss and elected to bat.
- Abrar Ahmed and Tayyab Tahir (Pak) both made their ODI debuts.
- Saim Ayub (Pak) scored his first century in ODIs.

=== 3rd ODI ===
28 November 2024
09:30
Scorecard

Pakistan; 303/6 (50 overs)	v	Zimbabwe; 204 (40.1 overs)
Kamran Ghulam 103 (99); Sikandar Raza 2/47 (10 overs)		Craig Ervine 51 (63); Aamir Jamal 2/19 (5 overs)

Pakistan won by 99 runs
Queens Sports Club, Bulawayo
Umpires: Michael Gough (Eng) and Langton Rusere (Zim)
Player of the match: Kamran Ghulam (Pak)

- Pakistan won the toss and elected to bat.
- Kamran Ghulam (Pak) scored his first century in ODIs.

== T20I series ==
=== 1st T20I ===
1 December 2024
13:00
Scorecard

Pakistan; 165/4 (20 overs)	v	Zimbabwe; 108 (15.3 overs)
Tayyab Tahir 39* (25); Sikandar Raza 1/14 (4 overs)		Sikandar Raza 39 (28); Sufiyan Muqeem 3/20 (4 overs)

Pakistan won by 57 runs
Queens Sports Club, Bulawayo
Umpires: Langton Rusere (Zim) and Percival Sizara (Zim)
Player of the match: Tayyab Tahir (Pak)

- Pakistan won the toss and elected to bat.

=== 2nd T20I ===
3 December 2024
13:00
Scorecard

Zimbabwe; 57 (12.4 overs)	v	Pakistan; 61/0 (5.3 overs)
Brian Bennett 21 (14); Sufiyan Muqeem 5/3 (2.4 overs)		Saim Ayub 36* (18)

Pakistan won by 10 wickets
Queens Sports Club, Bulawayo
Umpires: Iknow Chabi (Zim) and Forster Mutizwa (Zim)
Player of the match: Sufiyan Muqeem (Pak)

- Zimbabwe won the toss and elected to bat.
- Sufiyan Muqeem (Pak) took his first five-wicket haul in T20Is.
- This was Zimbabwe's lowest total in T20Is.

=== 3rd T20I ===
5 December 2024
13:00
Scorecard

Pakistan; 132/7 (20 overs)	v	Zimbabwe; 133/8 (19.5 overs)
Salman Ali Agha 32 (32); Blessing Muzarabani 2/26 (4 overs)		Brian Bennett 43 (35); Abbas Afridi 3/24 (4 overs)

Zimbabwe won by 2 wickets
Queens Sports Club, Bulawayo
Umpires: Iknow Chabi (Zim) and Langton Rusere (Zim)
Player of the match: Brian Bennett (Zim)

- Pakistan won the toss and elected to bat.
- Tinotenda Maposa (Zim) made his T20I debut.
