= Hussain Bhola =

Zimbabwean cricketer (born 1996)

Personal information
- Full name: Mohammed Hussain Bhola
- Born: 29 May 1996 (age 30)
- Source: Cricinfo, 13 December 2019

Hussain Bhola (born 29 May 1996) is a Zimbabwean cricketer. He made his first-class debut on 12 December 2019, for Mid West Rhinos in the 2019–20 Logan Cup.
