= Patrick Mambo =

Zimbabwean cricketer (born 1995)

Personal information
- Full name: Patrick Taremekedzwa Mambo
- Born: 15 November 1995 (age 30); Harare, Zimbabwe
- Batting: Right-handed
- Bowling: Right arm medium
- Source: Cricinfo, 17 April 2018

Patrick Taremekedzwa Mambo (born 15 November 1995) is a Zimbabwean cricketer. He made his List A debut for Rising Stars in the 2017–18 Pro50 Championship on 17 April 2018. Prior to his List A debut, he was part of Zimbabwe's squad for the 2014 Under-19 Cricket World Cup. He made his Twenty20 debut for Zimbabwe in the 2018 Africa T20 Cup on 15 September 2018. He made his first-class debut on 18 December 2019, for Mashonaland Eagles in the 2019–20 Logan Cup. In December 2020, he was selected to play for the Southern Rocks in the 2020–21 Logan Cup.
