= Sri Lankan cricket team in India in 2019–20 =

International cricket tour

	India	Sri Lanka
- Dates: 5 – 10 January 2020
Captains	Virat Kohli	Lasith Malinga

Twenty20 International series
- Results: India won the 3-match series 2–0
Most runs	KL Rahul (99)	Dhananjaya de Silva (74)
Most wickets	Navdeep Saini (5); Shardul Thakur (5)	Lakshan Sandakan (3); Wanindu Hasaranga (3)
- Player of the series: Navdeep Saini (Ind)

The Sri Lanka cricket team toured India in January 2020 to play three Twenty20 International (T20I) matches. Originally, Zimbabwe were scheduled to tour India. However, on 25 September 2019, the Board of Control for Cricket in India (BCCI) cancelled the Zimbabwe series following the International Cricket Council's (ICC) suspension of Zimbabwe Cricket. Sri Lanka were confirmed as their replacement for the tour. All of the formats, venues and dates remained the same. India won the series 3–0.

== Squads ==
T20Is
India	Sri Lanka
Virat Kohli (c); Jasprit Bumrah; Yuzvendra Chahal; Shikhar Dhawan; Shivam Dube; Shreyas Iyer; Ravindra Jadeja; Manish Pandey; Rishabh Pant (wk); KL Rahul; Sanju Samson; Navdeep Saini; Washington Sundar; Shardul Thakur; Kuldeep Yadav	Lasith Malinga (c); Dhananjaya de Silva; Niroshan Dickwella (wk); Avishka Fernando; Oshada Fernando; Danushka Gunathilaka; Wanindu Hasaranga; Lahiru Kumara; Angelo Mathews; Kusal Mendis; Kusal Perera; Bhanuka Rajapaksa; Kasun Rajitha; Lakshan Sandakan; Dasun Shanaka; Isuru Udana

== T20I series ==
=== 1st T20I ===
5 January 2020
19:00 (N)
Scorecard

Sri Lanka	v	India

No result due to wet outfield.
Barsapara Stadium, Guwahati
Umpires: Chettithody Shamshuddin (Ind) and Nitin Menon (Ind)

- India won the toss and opted to field
- Due to rain and wet outfield, match was called off without a ball bowled.

=== 2nd T20I ===
7 January 2020
19:00 (N)
Scorecard

Sri Lanka; 142/9 (20 overs)	v	India; 144/3 (17.3 overs)
Kusal Perera 34 (28); Shardul Thakur 3/23 (4 overs)		KL Rahul 45 (32); Wanindu Hasaranga 2/30 (4 overs)

India won by 7 wickets
Holkar Stadium, Indore
Umpires: Anil Chaudhary (Ind) and Chettithody Shamshuddin (Ind)
Player of the match: Navdeep Saini (Ind)

- India won the toss and elected to field.

=== 3rd T20I ===
10 January 2020
19:00 (N)
Scorecard

India; 201/6 (20 overs)	v	Sri Lanka; 123 (15.5 overs)
KL Rahul 54 (36); Lakshan Sandakan 3/35 (4 overs)		Dhananjaya de Silva 57 (36); Navdeep Saini 3/28 (3.5 overs)

India won by 78 runs
Maharashtra Cricket Association Stadium, Pune
Umpires: Nitin Menon (Ind) and Virender Sharma (Ind)
Player of the match: Shardul Thakur (Ind)

- Sri Lanka won the toss and elected to field.

== Statistics ==
=== Most runs ===
Rank	Runs	Player	Innings	Average	High Score	Strike Rate	50
1	99	(India) KL Rahul	2	49.50	54	145.58	1
2	84	(India) Shikhar Dhawan	2	42.00	52	129.23	1
3	74	(Sri Lanka) Dhananjaya de Silva	2	37.00	57	151.02	1
4	56	(India) Virat Kohli	2	56.00	30*	164.70	0
5	41	(Sri Lanka) Kusal Perera	2	20.50	34	107.89	0
Last Updated: 1 August 2020

=== Most wickets ===
Rank	Wickets	Player	Innings	Best	Average	Economy
1	5	(India) Shardul Thakur	2	3/23	8.40	6.00
1	5	(India) Navdeep Saini	2	3/28	9.20	5.87
2	3	(Sri Lanka) Lakshan Sandakan	1	3/35	11.66	8.75
2	3	(Sri Lanka) Wanindu Hasaranga	2	2/30	19.00	7.12
2	3	(India) Washington Sundar	2	2/37	22.00	8.25
Last Updated: 1 August 2020

Sri Lankan cricket team in Zimbabwe in 2019-20
