= Akshay Patel =

Zimbabwean cricketer (born 1997)

Personal information
- Born: 1 June 1997 (age 29)
- Source: Cricinfo, 14 April 2021

Akshay Patel (born 1 June 1997) is a Zimbabwean cricketer. In December 2020, he was named in the Mountaineers' squad for the 2020–21 Logan Cup. He made his List A debut on 20 April 2021, for Mountaineers, in the 2020–21 Pro50 Championship.

Prior to his List A debut, he was named in Zimbabwe's squad for the 2016 Under-19 Cricket World Cup, where he made his international debut, against England.
