= 2019–20 Pro50 Championship =

Cricket tournament

- Dates: 4 February 2020 –
- Administrator(s): Zimbabwe Cricket
- Cricket format: List A cricket
- Tournament format(s): Round-robin and Final
- Participants: 5

The 2019–20 Pro50 Championship was the eighteenth edition of the Pro50 Championship, a List A cricket tournament that was played in Zimbabwe. It started on 4 February 2020, with five teams taking part. Mashonaland Eagles were the defending champions.

On 18 March 2020, Zimbabwe Cricket suspended all forms of cricket in the country due to the COVID-19 pandemic. On 4 May 2020, Zimbabwe Cricket voided the tournament due to the pandemic with no winner being declared.

== Points table ==
Pos	Team	Pld	W	L	T	NR	BP	Pts	NRR
1	Matabeleland Tuskers	5	4	0	0	1	2	11	1.895
2	Mountaineers	5	3	1	0	1	2	9	1.065
3	Mashonaland Eagles	5	2	2	0	1	2	7	−0.228
4	Mid West Rhinos	4	1	3	0	0	0	2	−0.528
5	Rangers	5	0	4	0	1	0	1	−2.345

== Fixtures ==
=== Round-robin ===
4 February 2020
Scorecard

Mountaineers; 289/7 (50 overs)	v	Mashonaland Eagles; 160 (42.2 overs)
Joylord Gumbie 90 (122); Daniel Jakiel 2/55 (6 overs)		Tony Munyonga 46 (63); Shingi Masakadza 3/14 (7 overs)

Mountaineers won by 129 runs
Harare Sports Club, Harare
Umpires: Ashby Mutumbami and Forster Mutizwa

- Mountaineers won the toss and elected to bat.

4 February 2020
Scorecard

Rangers; 148 (44.2 overs)	v	Matabeleland Tuskers; 149/2 (20.3 overs)
Johnathan Campbell 42 (87); Sheunopa Musekwa 3/29 (10 overs)		Sean Williams 51* (28); Charlton Tshuma 1/36 (4.3 overs)

Tuskers won by 8 wickets
Queens Sports Club, Bulawayo
Umpires: Trevor Phiri and Christopher Phiri

- Matabeleland Tuskers won the toss and elected to field.
- Aarsh Jha, Sheunopa Musekwa (Matabeleland Tuskers), Marshal Takodza, Clive Imbayago, Johnathan Campbell, Daniel Zvidzai, Alvin Chiradza, Manson Chikowero and Davis Murwendo (Rangers) all made their List A debuts.

5 February 2020
Scorecard

Mountaineers; 234 (48.4 overs)	v	Mashonaland Eagles; 175 (43.4 overs)
Roy Kaia 40 (53); Richard Ngarava 3/52 (10 overs)		Tinashe Kamunhukamwe 68 (76); Donald Tiripano 4/29 (6.4 overs)

Mountaineers won by 58 runs (DLS method)
Harare Sports Club, Harare
Umpires: Ashby Mutumbami and Forster Mutizwa

- Mountaineers won the toss and elected to bat.

5 February 2020
Scorecard

Rangers; 169 (40.4 overs)	v	Matabeleland Tuskers; 117/2 (16.3 overs)
Brendan Taylor 40 (42); Sean Williams 4/44 (9 overs)		Sean Williams 61* (39); Charlton Tshuma 1/27 (5 overs)

Matabeleland Tuskers won by 8 wickets (DLS method)
Queens Sports Club, Bulawayo
Umpires: Trevor Phiri and Christopher Phiri

- Matabeleland Tuskers won the toss and elected to field.
- Tanunurwa Makoni and Kudakwashe Macheka (Rangers) both made their List A debuts.

8 February 2020
Scorecard

Mid West Rhinos; 141/7 (25 overs)	v	Mashonaland Eagles; 143/1 (17.1 overs)
Tarisai Musakanda 40 (37); Keith Jaure 2/31 (5 overs)		Tinashe Kamunhukamwe 81* (56); Tafara Chingwara 1/20 (3 overs)

Mashonaland Eagles won by 9 wickets (DLS method)
Harare Sports Club, Harare
Umpires: Sifelani Rwaziyeni and Tafadzwa Musakwa

- Mashonaland Eagles won the toss and elected to field.
- Wesley Madhevere (Mashonaland Eagles) made his List A debut.

8 February 2020
Scorecard

Mountaineers; 181/6 (24 overs)	v	Matabeleland Tuskers; 183/1 (21.4 overs)
Richmond Mutumbami 55 (37); Sean Williams 3/39 (5 overs)		Brian Chari 102* (72); William Mashinge 1/10 (2 overs)

Matabeleland Tuskers won by 9 wickets (DLS method)
Takashinga Sports Club, Harare
Umpires: Forster Mutizwa and Walter Musakwa

- Matabeleland Tuskers won the toss and elected to field.

10 February 2020
Scorecard

Mashonaland Eagles; 252/6 (36 overs)	v	Rangers; 141 (32 overs)
Elton Chigumbura 70 (69); Kudakwashe Macheka 3/41 (7 overs)		Marshal Takodza 56* (67); Wesley Madhevere 4/28 (6 overs)

Mashonaland Eagles won by 111 runs
Old Georgians Sports Club, Harare
Umpires: Stanley Gogwe and Percival Sizara

- Rangers won the toss and elected to field.

10 February 2020
Scorecard

Mountaineers; 279/8 (50 overs)	v	Mid West Rhinos; 269/5 (50 overs)
Richmond Mutumbami 86 (77); Carl Mumba 4/53 (10 overs)		Prince Masvaure 100 (99); Victor Nyauchi 3/37 (10 overs)

Mountaineers won by 10 runs
Harare Sports Club, Harare
Umpires: David Shawane and Christopher Phiri

- Mountaineers won the toss and elected to bat.

12 February 2020
Scorecard

Rangers	v	Mountaineers

Match abandoned
Old Hararians, Harare
Umpires: Iknow Chabi and David Shawane

- No toss.
- No play was possible due to rain.

12 February 2020
Scorecard

Matabeleland Tuskers; 161 (41.2 overs)	v	Mid West Rhinos; 112 (30.1 overs)
Luke Jongwe 50 (68); Carl Mumba 4/47 (9 overs)		Neville Madziva 27 (52); Ainsley Ndlovu 4/36 (9 overs)

Matabeleland Tuskers won by 49 runs
Harare Sports Club, Harare
Umpires: Forster Mutizwa and Christopher Phiri

- Mid West Rhinos won the toss and elected to field.
- Milton Shumba (Matabeleland Tuskers) made his List A debut.

14 February 2020
Scorecard

Mashonaland Eagles	v	Matabeleland Tuskers

Match abandoned
Old Hararians, Harare
Umpires: Walter Musakwa and Christopher Phiri

- No toss.
- No play was possible due to rain.

14 February 2020
Scorecard

Mid West Rhinos; 198/7 (44 overs)	v	Rangers; 203 (43.2 overs)
Neville Madziva 65* (80); Clive Chitumba 2/29 (7 overs)		Johnathan Campbell 76 (68); Trevor Chibvongodze 4/30 (9 overs)

Mid West Rhinos won by 10 runs (DLS method)
Harare Sports Club, Harare
Umpires: Iknow Chabi and Forster Mutizwa

- Rangers won the toss and elected to field.
- Ronald Masocha (Mid West Rhinos) and Dylan Hondo (Rangers) both made their List A debuts.
