= Mashford Shungu =

Zimbabwean cricketer (born 2004)

Personal information
- Full name: Mashford Tinotenda Shungu
- Born: 7 October 2004 (age 20)
- Batting: Left-handed
- Bowling: Left arm medium fast

Domestic team information
- Years: Team
- 2023-present: Mountaineers
- Source: Cricinfo, 7 December 2024

Mashford Tinotenda Shungu (born 7 October 2004) is a Zimbabwean cricketer.

== Career ==
He made his first-class debut for Mountaineers against Matabeleland Tuskers on 3 February 2023 during the 2022–23 Logan Cup. He made his T20 debut for Mountaineers against Matabeleland Tuskers on 25 February 2023 during the 2023 Zimbabwe Domestic Twenty20 Competition. He made his List A debut for Mountaineers against Mid West Rhinos on 22 October 2023 during the 2023–24 Pro50 Championship. In December 2023, he was named in Zimbabwe's squad for the 2024 ICC Under-19 Cricket World Cup which was held in South Africa.
