= Mihlali Mpongwana =

South African cricketer (born 2000)

Personal information
- Full name: Mihlali Clint Mpongwana
- Born: 15 May 2000 (age 26); Cape Town, Western Cape, South Africa
- Batting: Right-handed
- Bowling: Right-arm fast-medium
- Role: Bowling all-rounder

International information
- National side: South Africa
- Only ODI (cap 157): 10 February 2025 v New Zealand

Domestic team information
- Years: Team
- 2018/19–2023/24: Western Province
- 2019/20–2020/21: Cape Cobras

Career statistics
Competition	FC	LA	T20
Matches	20	35	17
Runs scored	360	598	63
Batting average	17.14	35.17	7.87
100s/50s	0/2	1/2	0/0
Top score	77	105	43
Balls bowled	1,749	1,158	171
Wickets	34	44	11
Bowling average	28.05	22.95	23.27
5 wickets in innings	1	0	0
10 wickets in match	0	0	0
Best bowling	5/39	4/32	3/14
Catches/stumpings	9/–	8/–	3/–
- Source: ESPNcricinfo, 30 December 2023

Mihlali Clint Mpongwana (born 15 May 2000) is a South African cricketer. He made his List A debut for Western Province in the 2018–19 CSA Provincial One-Day Challenge on 20 January 2019. He made his first-class debut for Western Province in the 2018–19 CSA 3-Day Provincial Cup on 14 March 2019. In September 2019, he was named in Western Province's squad for the 2019–20 CSA Provincial T20 Cup. He made his Twenty20 debut for Western Province in the 2019–20 CSA Provincial T20 Cup on 14 September 2019. In April 2021, he was named in Western Province's squad, ahead of the 2021–22 cricket season in South Africa.

In July 2024 he was appointed a captain of the South Africa Emerging Players for the tour of Zimbabwe. On 05 Feb 2025, Mpongwana was named in the squad for the Tri-Series in Pakistan, his ODI debut.
