= Ashley Mufandauya =

Zimbabwean cricketer (born 2001)

Personal information
- Born: 15 December 2001 (age 24); Harare, Zimbabwe
- Batting: Right-handed
- Bowling: Right-arm offbreak

Domestic team information
- Years: Team
- 2020–present: Mashonaland Eagles
- Source: Cricinfo, 28 February 2020

Ashley Mufandauya (born 15 December 2001) is a Zimbabwean cricketer. He made his first-class debut on 26 February 2020, for Mashonaland Eagles in the 2019–20 Logan Cup. In December 2020, he was selected to play for the Eagles in the 2020–21 Logan Cup. He made his List A debut on 18 April 2021, for Eagles, in the 2020–21 Pro50 Championship.
