= Prosper Mugeri =

Zimbabwean cricketer (born 1996)

Personal information
- Full name: Prosper Aaron Mugeri
- Born: 4 May 1996 (age 28); Nyanga, Zimbabwe
- Batting: Left-handed
- Bowling: Right arm medium
- Role: All-rounder
- Source: Cricinfo, 31 December 2024

Prosper Aaron Mugeri (born 4 May 1996) is a Zimbabwean cricketer.

== Career ==
He made his List A debut for Mountaineers against Southern Rocks on 27 October 2023 during the 2023–24 Pro50 Championship. He made his T20 debut for Mountaineers against Southern Rocks on 4 March 2024 during the 2024 Zimbabwe Domestic Twenty20 Competition. He made his first-class debut for Mashonaland Eagles against Mid West Rhinos on 25 November 2024 during the 2023–24 Logan Cup.
