= Luke Robinson (cricketer) =

English cricketer

Personal information
- Full name: Luke Stephen Robinson
- Born: 12 October 2003 (age 23); Sunderland, Tyne and Wear, England
- Batting: Left-handed
- Bowling: Right-arm medium

Domestic team information
- Years: Team
- 2023–2026: Durham (squad no. 12)
- FC debut: 1 May 2026 Durham v Middlesex
- LA debut: 11 August 2023 Durham v Derbyshire

Career statistics
Competition	FC	LA	T20
Matches	2	14	8
Runs scored	1	21	–
Batting average	–	10.50	–
100s/50s	0/0	0/0	–
Top score	1*	17*	–
Balls bowled	288	577	120
Wickets	2	16	6
Bowling average	81.00	35.06	29.33
5 wickets in innings	0	0	0
10 wickets in match	0	0	0
Best bowling	1/47	3/44	2/0
Catches/stumpings	0/–	2/–	2/–
- Source: CricInfo, 12 September 2026

Luke Stephen Robinson (born 12 October 2003) is an English cricketer who plays for Durham County Cricket Club. He is a left-handed batsman and right-arm medium pace bowler.

== Early life ==
Robinson attended Park View School in Chester-le-Street. His mother Helen and his father Stephen ran the junior cricket department of the Philadelphia Cricket Club in Houghton-le-Spring, Sunderland. Robinson made headlines as a thirteen year-old when he took six wickets in six balls, all clean bowled, playing age group cricket in 2017 for Philadelphia, with his father umpiring, his mother scoring, and his brother Mathew fielding, and his grandfather Glenn watching.

== Career ==
Robinson signed a professional contract with Durham Academy in May 2022 as an 18-year-old.

Robinson made his Durham debut in the T20 Blast against Leicestershire County Cricket Club on 4 June 2022. He took two wickets in three overs on debut.
