= Sydney Murombo =

Zimbabwean cricketer (born 1997)

Personal information
- Born: 22 March 1997 (age 29)
- Source: Cricinfo, 24 April 2021

Sydney Murombo (born 22 March 1997) is a Zimbabwean cricketer. In December 2020, he was named in the Rocks' squad for the 2020–21 Logan Cup. He made his List A debut on 28 April 2021, for Rocks, in final of the 2020–21 Pro50 Championship. Prior to his List A debut, he was named in Zimbabwe's squad for the 2016 Under-19 Cricket World Cup.
