= Dylan Hondo =

Zimbabwean cricketer (born 1995)

Personal information
- Full name: Dylan Tanaka Hondo
- Born: 28 May 1995 (age 31)
- Batting: Left-handed
- Bowling: Slow left-arm orthodox
- Source: ESPNcricinfo, 3 September 2016

Dylan Hondo (born 28 May 1995) is a Zimbabwean cricketer. He is a left-handed batsman and a left-arm orthodox bowler. He made his first class debut against SL Dev EM XI He made his List A debut on 14 February 2020 for Rangers in the 2019–20 Pro50 Championship.
