= Brian Mudzinganyama =

Zimbabwean cricketer (born 1995)

Personal information
- Born: 9 April 1995 (age 31); Harare
- Batting: Left-handed
- Bowling: Right-arm offspin
- Role: Batter

International information
- National side: Zimbabwe
- Only Test (cap 109): 19 January 2020 v Sri Lanka
- Source: Cricinfo, 22 January 2020

Brian Mudzinganyama (born 9 April 1995) is a Zimbabwean cricketer. He made his List A debut for Mashonaland Eagles in the 2018–19 Pro50 Championship on 1 March 2019. He made his Twenty20 debut for Mashonaland Eagles in the 2018–19 Stanbic Bank 20 Series on 13 March 2019. He made his first-class debut on 18 December 2019, for Rangers in the 2019–20 Logan Cup.

In January 2020, he was named in Zimbabwe's Test squad for their series against Sri Lanka. He made his Test debut for Zimbabwe, against Sri Lanka, on 19 January 2020, as a concussion substitute for Kevin Kasuza. Mudzinganyama became the first cricketer to make his Test debut as a substitute.

In December 2020, he was selected to play for the Southern Rocks in the 2020–21 Logan Cup.
