= Tanunurwa Makoni =

Zimbabwean cricketer (born 1999)

Personal information
- Full name: Tanunurwa V Makoni
- Born: 28 November 1999 (age 26); Harare, Zimbabwe
- Batting: Right handed
- Bowling: Right arm medium
- Role: Opening batter

International information
- National side: Zimbabwe (2023)
- Test debut (cap 124): 4 February 2023 v West Indies
- Last Test: 12 February 2023 v West Indies

Career statistics
Competition	Test	FC	LA	T20
Matches	2	44	28	10
Runs scored	43	2251	450	186
Batting average	10.75	28.85	17.30	20.66
100s/50s	0/0	4/9	0/1	0/1
Top score	33	185*	64	57
Balls bowled	0	30	0	0
Wickets	0	1	0	0
Bowling average	–	12.00	–	–
5 wickets in innings	0	0	0	0
10 wickets in match	0	0	–	–
Best bowling	–	1/12	–	–
Catches/stumpings	1/–	20/–	6/–	1/–
- Source: Cricinfo, 12 April 2025

Tanunurwa Makoni (born 28 November 1999) is a Zimbabwean cricketer. He made his first-class debut on 18 December 2019, for Rangers in the 2019–20 Logan Cup. Prior to his first-class debut, he was named in Zimbabwe's squad for the 2018 Under-19 Cricket World Cup. He made his List A debut on 5 February 2020, for Rangers in the 2019–20 Pro50 Championship. In December 2020, he was selected to play for the Tuskers in the 2020–21 Logan Cup.

== Career ==
On 4 February 2023, Makoni made his Test debut against the West Indies. In his two Test matches, he has scored a total of 43 runs, with an average of 10.75.
