= Bright Phiri =

Zimbabwean cricketer (born 1999)

Personal information
- Born: 9 March 1999 (age 27); Kadoma, Zimbabwe
- Source: Cricinfo, 3 May 2018

Bright Phiri (born 9 March 1999) is a Zimbabwean cricketer. He made his first-class debut for Matabeleland Tuskers in the 2017–18 Logan Cup on 2 May 2018. Prior to his debut, he was part of a high performance squad of under-19 players, who were selected to face Canada. In December 2020, he was selected to play for the Tuskers in the 2020–21 Logan Cup. He made his Twenty20 debut on 14 April 2021, for Tuskers, in the 2020–21 Zimbabwe Domestic Twenty20 Competition. He made his List A debut on 18 April 2021, for Tuskers, in the 2020–21 Pro50 Championship.
