= Lesego Senokwane =

South African cricketer (born 1997)

Personal information
- Born: 24 May 1997 (age 29); Klerksdorp, North West Province, South Africa
- Batting: Right-handed
- Bowling: Right-arm offbreak
- Role: Top order batter

International information
- National side: South Africa
- Only Test (cap 373): 6 July 2025 v Zimbabwe

Domestic team information
- Years: Team
- 2015–present: North West

Career statistics
Competition	FC	LA	T20
Matches	50	55	37
Runs scored	2,612	1,261	491
Batting average	31.46	23.35	17.53
100s/50s	7/8	2/5	0/0
Top score	205	109	46
Balls bowled	957	105	91
Wickets	14	4	6
Bowling average	57.85	28.25	23.00
5 wickets in innings	0	0	0
10 wickets in match	0	0	0
Best bowling	2/26	4/13	3/18
Catches/stumpings	57/–	21/–	14/–
- Source: ESPNcricinfo, 2 September 2016

Lesego Senokwane (born 24 May 1997) is a South African cricketer. He is a right-handed batsman and right arm off break bowler. He plays domestic cricket for North West.

He made his Twenty20 cricket debut for North West in the 2016 Africa T20 Cup on 2 September 2016. In September 2018, he was named in North West's squad for the 2018 Africa T20 Cup. In September 2019, he was named in North West's squad for the 2019–20 CSA Provincial T20 Cup. In April 2021, he was named in North West's squad, ahead of the 2021–22 cricket season in South Africa.

In June 2025, he earned maiden call-up for national team for the Test series against Zimbabwe.
