= Kundai Matigimu =

Zimbabwean cricketer (born 1998)

Personal information
- Born: 2 February 1998 (age 28)
- Batting: Right-handed
- Bowling: Right-arm fast
- Role: Bowler

International information
- National side: Zimbabwe
- Only Test (cap 137): 6 July 2025 v South Africa

Domestic team information
- Years: Team
- 2025–present: Eagles
- 2025: Southern

Career statistics
Competition	Test	FC	T20
Matches	1	5	5
Runs scored	0	130	64
Batting average	0.00	14.44	21.33
100s/50s	0/0	0/0	0/0
Top score	0	35	34
Balls bowled	129	729	96
Wickets	2	15	6
Bowling average	62.00	31.06	25.00
5 wickets in innings	0	0	0
10 wickets in match	0	0	–
Best bowling	2/124	4/20	3/21
Catches/stumpings	0/–	1/–	1/–
- Source: Cricinfo, 9 July 2025

Kundai Matigimu (born 2 February 1998) is a Zimbabwean cricketer, who plays for Zimbabwe and Eagles in domestic cricket as a right-arm fast bowler. He has also played for Zimbabwe under-19 cricket team.

== Career ==
Matigimu made his first-class debut against Mid West Rhinos on 9 February 2025 during the 2024–25 Logan Cup. He made his T20 debut against Matabeleland Tuskers on 24 March 2025 during the 2025 Zimbabwe Domestic Twenty20 Competition.

In June 2025, Matigimu was named in Zimbabwe's squad for their Test series against South Africa. He made his Test debut in the same series on 6 July 2025.
