= Johnathan Campbell =

Zimbabwean cricketer (born 1997)

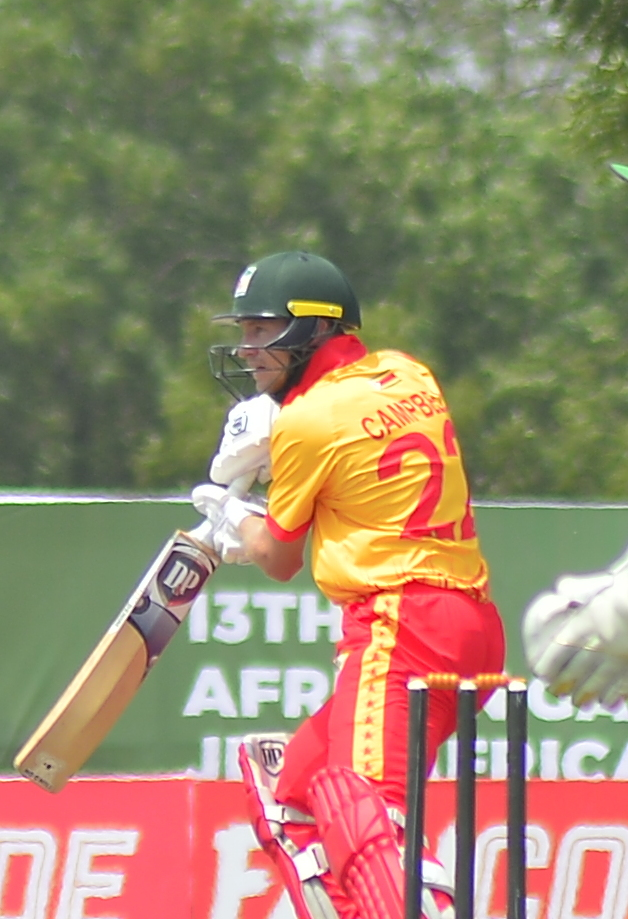
- 2023 African Games

Personal information
- Full name: Johnathan Mitchell Ross Campbell
- Born: 17 December 1997 (age 28); Harare, Zimbabwe
- Batting: Left-handed
- Bowling: Leg spin
- Role: All-rounder
- Relatives: Alistair Campbell (father); Donald Campbell (uncle)

International information
- National side: Zimbabwe (2024–present)
- Only Test (cap 133): 6 February 2025 v Ireland
- ODI debut (cap 162): 14 February 2025 v Ireland
- Last ODI: 16 February 2025 v Ireland
- T20I debut (cap 78): 5 May 2024 v Bangladesh
- Last T20I: 14 July 2024 v India

Domestic team information
- Years: Team
- 2019–present: Rangers

Career statistics
Competition	Test	ODI	T20I	FC
Matches	1	3	9	42
Runs scored	37	8	123	2,357
Batting average	18.50	8.00	15.37	32.73
100s/50s	0/0	0/0	0/0	4/13
Top score	33	6*	45	194
Balls bowled	84	12	–	3,141
Wickets	1	0	–	50
Bowling average	47.00	–	–	37.56
5 wickets in innings	0	–	–	0
10 wickets in match	0	–	–	0
Best bowling	1/47	–	–	4/62
Catches/stumpings	1/–	3/–	3/–	28/–
- Source: Cricinfo, 26 February 2026

Johnathan Mitchell Ross Campbell (born 17 December 1997) is a Zimbabwean cricketer.

== Domestic career ==
He made his Twenty20 debut for Boost Defenders in the 2017 Shpageeza Cricket League on 15 September 2017. He made his first-class debut on 18 December 2019, for Rangers in the 2019–20 Logan Cup. He made his List A debut on 4 February 2020, for Rangers in the 2019–20 Pro50 Championship. In December 2020, he was selected to play for the Rhinos in the 2020–21 Logan Cup.

== International career ==
In March 2024, he was included in Zimbabwe's contingent for the 2023 African Games and he represented Zimbabwe Emerging Team in the men's cricket tournament at the 2023 African Games. Zimbabwe eventually claimed gold medal in the African Games cricket tournament defeating Namibia by 8 wickets in the final.

In April 2024, he received his maiden international call-up to join Zimbabwe at international cricket when he was named in Zimbabwe's T20I squad to face-off Bangladesh in a five-match T20I bilateral series in Bangladesh. He made his T20I debut on 5 May 2024 against Bangladesh and he made an immediate impact on T20I debut with a swashbuckling quickfire unbeaten knock of 45 runs after facing only 24 balls and his innings had a flurry of boundaries with a whopping staggering strike rate of 187.5 and he showed a lot of intent during his counterattacking knock. His debut innings included 4 fours and 3 sixes while it also propelled Zimbabwe to a somewhat respectable total of 138 for the loss of seven wickets, only to be breezed past by Bangladesh quite comfortably in the end. In July 2024, he was subsequently retained in Zimbabwe's T20I squad for their home bilateral T20I series against India. In December 2024, he received his maiden call-up to join Zimbabwe's Test squad ahead of their two-match home Test series against Afghanistan. However, he was benched and was not selected for any of the Test matches during the series.

In February 2025, Campbell was selected to play his first Test match for his country, when he was named in the one-off Test against Ireland which was played at Queens Sports Club, Bulawayo. In the absence of several prominent key experienced players, he was also chosen to captain the team by Zimbabwe Cricket. Campbell as the stand-in captain filled the void left by Craig Ervine who had to be withdrawn from the Test owing to a family emergency and it was later confirmed that Ervine had to be ruled out due to the birth of his first child. During the process, he became the 36th player to captain his country on Test debut and only the second Zimbabwean after David Houghton to captain Zimbabwe on Test debut. He also coincidentally notably received his maiden Test cap from his father Alistair Campbell who had also represented Zimbabwe at international cricket. Alistair Campbell and Johnathan Campbell also set the record by becoming only the fourth father-son pair ever to complete the unique feat of having captained a nation in Test cricket and the duo became the first father-son pair to have captained Zimbabwe at Test level.
