= Nigel Bonyongwe =

Zimbabwean cricketer (born 1994)

Personal information
- Born: 29 April 1994 (age 30); Mutare, Zimbabwe
- Batting: Right-handed
- Bowling: Right arm offbreak

Domestic team information
- Years: Team
- 2015-present: Mountaineers
- Source: Cricinfo, 6 December 2024

Nigel Bonyongwe (born 29 April 1994) is a Zimbabwean cricketer.

== Career ==
He made his first-class debut for Mountaineers against Mid West Rhinos on 12 March 2015 during the 2014–15 Logan Cup.

He made his List A debut for Mountaineers against Mid West Rhinos on 26 April 2021 during the 2020–21 Pro50 Championship.
