= Oli Gibson =

English cricketer

Oliver Gibson
Personal information
- Full name: Oliver James Gibson
- Born: 7 June 2000 (age 26); Northallerton, Yorkshire, England
- Batting: Right-handed
- Bowling: Right-arm medium-fast

Domestic team information
- Years: Team
- 2022–2024: Durham
- First-class debut: 14 April 2022 Durham v Leicestershire
- List A debut: 4 August 2022 Durham v Surrey

Career statistics
Competition	FC	LA	T20
Matches	9	10	4
Runs scored	8	26	–
Batting average	1.33	5.20	–
100s/50s	0/0	0/0	–
Top score	6	6	–
Balls bowled	1,085	407	30
Wickets	17	13	5
Bowling average	39.11	35.69	7.20
5 wickets in innings	0	0	0
10 wickets in match	0	0	0
Best bowling	4/39	3/54	3/12
Catches/stumpings	1/–	2/–	1/–
- Source: ESPNcricinfo, 26 June 2024

Oliver James Gibson (born 7 June 2000) is an English cricketer. He is a right-handed batsman and right-arm medium-fast bowler who most recently played for Durham.

== Early life ==
He complete his school career at the Queen Elizabeth Grammar School at Hexham and complete his college at the Queen Elizabeth Sixth Form College at Darlington.

== Career ==
Born in Northallerton in Yorkshire, Gibson played for Northumberland in the Minor Counties Twenty20 in 2023. In December 2022, he signed a professional contract for the first time by Durham County Cricket Club.

He made his first-class debut for Durham against Leicestershire in the 2022 County Championship, on 14 April 2022. He made his List A debut for Durham against Surrey in the 2022 One-Day Cup, on 4 August 2022. He made his Twenty20 (T20) debut for Durham against Southern Rocks in the 2023–24 Zimbabwe Domestic Twenty20 Competition, on 5 March 2024.

Gibson left Durham when his contract expired in October 2024.
