= Simon Mugava =

Zimbabwean cricketer (born 1990)

Personal information
- Full name: Simon Munyaradzi Mugava
- Born: 29 November 1990 (age 35); Harare, Zimbabwe
- Batting: Right-handed
- Bowling: Right-arm off break
- Source: Cricinfo, 7 September 2016

Simon Mugava (born 29 November 1990) is a Zimbabwean first-class cricketer who plays for Mid West Rhinos. He was part of Zimbabwe's squad for the 2010 Under-19 Cricket World Cup.

He made his first-class debut for Mid West Rhinos against Mountaineers at Mutare Sports Club on 23 March 2010 in the 2009–10 Logan Cup. He made his List A debut on 7 April 2010 against Mashonaland Eagles in the 2009–10 Faithwear Metbank One-Day Competition. He made his Twenty20 debut on 29 November 2011 against Matabeleland Tuskers in the 2011–12 Stanbic Bank 20 Series.
