= Marshal Takodza =

Zimbabwean cricketer (born 2000)

Personal information
- Full name: Marshal Takodza
- Born: 29 July 2000 (age 26)
- Source: Cricinfo, 18 December 2019

Marshal Takodza (born 29 July 2000) is a Zimbabwean cricketer. He made his first-class debut on 18 December 2019, for Rangers in the 2019–20 Logan Cup. He made his List A debut on 4 February 2020, for Rangers in the 2019–20 Pro50 Championship.
