= Rangers cricket team =

Zimbabwean cricket team

Rangers
Team information
- Founded: 2019

The Rangers are Zimbabwean first-class cricket team that was formed in 2019, ahead of the 2019–20 Logan Cup tournament. In December 2019, Rangers lost their opening match, against Mashonaland Eagles, by one wicket. In a truncated tournament, due to the COVID-19 pandemic, Rangers finished bottom of the table, with just four points from their six matches.

== Squad ==
For the 2019–20 Logan Cup, the squad contained the following players:

- David Brent
- Johnathan Campbell
- Manson Chikowero
- Alvin Chiradza
- Clive Chitumba
- Dylan Hondo
- Clive Imbayago
- Kyle Jarvis
- Gregory Liebenberg
- Kudakwashe Macheka
- Tanunurwa Makoni
- Sydney Murombo
- Davis Murwendo
- Brian Mudzinganyama
- Marshal Takodza
- Brendan Taylor
- Charlton Tshuma
- Daniel Zvidzai
