= Newman Nyamhuri =

Zimbabwean cricketer (born 2006)

Personal information
- Full name: Newman Takudzwa Nyamhuri
- Born: 19 January 2006 (age 20); Harare, Zimbabwe
- Batting: Right-handed
- Bowling: Left-arm medium-fast
- Role: Bowler

International information
- National side: Zimbabwe (2024–present)
- Test debut (cap 132): 26 December 2024 v Afghanistan
- Last Test: 2 January 2025 v Afghanistan
- ODI debut (cap 160): 17 December 2024 v Afghanistan
- Last ODI: 21 December 2024 v Afghanistan

Domestic team information
- Years: Team
- 2024–present: Southern Rocks

Career statistics
Competition	Test	ODIs	FC
Matches	3	4	3
Runs scored	45	8	45
Batting average	9.00	4.00	9.00
100s/50s	0/0	0/0	0/0
Top score	26	7	26
Balls bowled	381	132	381
Wickets	4	3	4
Bowling average	61.75	44.00	61.75
5 wickets in innings	0	0	0
10 wickets in match	0	0	0
Best bowling	3/42	3/53	3/42
Catches/stumpings	1/–	0/–	1/–
- Source: ESPNcricinfo, 25 February 2025

Newman Takudzwa Nyamhuri (born 19 January 2006) is a Zimbabwean cricketer.

== Career ==
A left-arm fast-medium bowler, Nyamhuri played for Zimbabwe under-19s in the 2024 Under-19 Cricket World Cup, when he was the leading wicket taker for Zimbabwe with eight wickets. He made his List A debut for Southern Rocks in the 2024–25 Pro50 Championship on 25 October 2024.

Nyamhuri got his maiden international call-up during the Afghan tour of Zimbabwe in 2024–25, making his ODI debut on 17 December 2024 and Test debut on 26 December 2024. His Test debut was also his first-class debut. He made his Twenty20 for Southern Rocks on 25 March 2025, against Mashonaland Eagles in the 2025 Zimbabwe Domestic Twenty20 Competition.
