= Sheunopa Musekwa =

Zimbabwean cricketer (born 1994)

Personal information
- Born: 16 January 1994 (age 32); Bulawayo, Zimbabwe
- Source: Cricinfo, 6 May 2017

Sheunopa Musekwa (born 16 January 1994) is a Zimbabwean cricketer. He made his first-class debut for Matabeleland Tuskers in the 2016–17 Logan Cup on 6 May 2017. He made his Twenty20 debut for Matabeleland Tuskers in the 2018–19 Stanbic Bank 20 Series on 15 March 2019. He made his List A debut on 4 February 2020, for Matabeleland Tuskers in the 2019–20 Pro50 Championship. In December 2020, he was selected to play for the Tuskers in the 2020–21 Logan Cup.
