= Davis Murwendo =

Zimbabwean cricketer (born 1998)

Personal information
- Born: 25 March 1998 (age 28)
- Source: Cricinfo, 19 April 2018

Davis Murwendo (born 25 May 1998) is a Zimbabwean cricketer. He made his first-class debut for Rising Stars in the 2017–18 Logan Cup on 19 April 2018. He made his List A debut on 4 February 2020, for Rangers in the 2019–20 Pro50 Championship. In December 2020, he was selected to play for the Rhinos in the 2020–21 Logan Cup.
