= Antum Naqvi =

Belgium-born Zimbabwean cricketer

Personal information
- Full name: Antum Amir Naqvi
- Born: 5 April 1999 (age 27); Brussels, Belgium
- Batting: Right-handed
- Bowling: Right-arm off-spin
- Role: Batting all-rounder

International information
- National side: Zimbabwe (2026–present)
- Only Test (cap 138): 5–9 November 2026 v Afghanistan

Domestic team information
- Years: Team
- 2022/23–present: Mid West Rhinos

Career statistics
Competition	Test	FC	LA	T20
Matches	1	25	28	20
Runs scored	70	1,941	1,442	453
Batting average	35.00	58.81	53.40	32.35
100s/50s	0/1	6/9	6/6	0/2
Top score	61	300*	158	61
Balls bowled	174	3,375	1,171	313
Wickets	0	62	34	20
Bowling average	–	28.14	29.47	18.05
5 wickets in innings	0	3	0	0
10 wickets in match	0	0	–	–
Best bowling	–	5/28	4/52	4/20
Catches/stumpings	0/–	14/–	9/–	11/–
- Source: Cricinfo, 10 November 2026

Antum Amir Naqvi (Urdu: انتم عامر نقوی; born 5 April 1999) is a Belgium-born Zimbabwean cricketer, who plays as a right-arm off-spinner and right-hand batter.

== Personal life ==
Naqvi was born in Brussels, Belgium, to Belgian parents whose families had migrated to Belgium from Pakistan and India. When he was four years old his family moved to Sydney, Australia, where he was educated at The Hills Sports High School. He is a qualified commercial pilot. His younger brother Awad Naqvi has played for Matabeleland Tuskers, Mid West Rhinos and Markhor IT in first-class cricket.

== Domestic career ==
While Naqvi was living and playing cricket in Darwin in Australia, he was encouraged to play cricket in Zimbabwe by the former Zimbabwe international player Solomon Mire. He made his first-class cricket debut in Zimbabwe in January 2023, playing for Mid West Rhinos in the Logan Cup against Eagles. He scored 140 not out batting at number six, and took 4 for 22 in the first innings and another wicket and three catches in the second innings in an innings victory for Rhinos. In his second match a few days later he scored 103 in Mid West Rhinos' only innings, thus becoming the 21st person in the history of first-class cricket to score hundreds in his first two innings. In the final match of the competition, Naqvi made a third century and took five wickets.

Naqvi made his List A debut in October 2023. In his second match, two days after his first, he took 3 for 56 and scored 128 not out off 93 balls, finishing off the victory for Rhinos with an unbroken 202-run partnership with Tarisai Musakanda. Since then Naqvi has scored several more List A 100s.

In January 2024, captaining Mid West Rhinos in the Logan Cup against Matabeleland Tuskers, Naqvi scored 300 not out off 295 deliveries before declaring at 538 for 3; Rhinos went on to win by an innings and 40 runs. It is the first triple-century in the history of Zimbabwean domestic cricket.

In March 2025, Naqvi captained Rhinos to the Zimbabwe Domestic Twenty20 championship. They won all four of their round-robin matches, then won the final, in which Naqvi scored 50 off 32 balls then took 2 for 19.

== International career ==
In July 2024, he earned his maiden call-up for the Zimbabwe national team for their T20I series against India. However, he did not play in any of the matches. In April 2025 he made his highest List A score, for Zimbabwe A against Scotland, making 158 off 110 deliveries. In October 2025, he was named in Zimbabwe's squad for the Test match against Afghanistan; once again, he was not selected in the final team.

Naqvi made his full international debut when he was selected in the Zimbabwe Test team to play Afghanistan in Sharjah in November 2026.
