= Tafadzwa Tsiga =

Zimbabwean cricketer (born 1994)

Personal information
- Full name: Tafadzwa Emmanuel Tsiga
- Born: 13 July 1994 (age 32); Harare, Zimbabwe
- Batting: Right-handed
- Bowling: Right-arm medium
- Role: Wicket-keeper batsman

International information
- National side: Zimbabwe (2023–)
- Test debut (cap 125): 4 February 2023 v West Indies
- Last Test: 7 August 2025 v New Zealand

Domestic team information
- Years: Team
- 2014–present: Southern Rocks

Career statistics
Competition	Test	FC	LA	T20
Matches	2	51	53	22
Runs scored	28	1996	1164	337
Batting average	9.33	27.72	25.86	24.07
100s/50s	0/0	1/15	0/6	0/1
Top score	24*	124	77*	69*
Catches/stumpings	4/0	129/4	58/8	7/2
- Source: ESPNcricinfo, 7 August 2025

Tafadzwa Tsiga (born 13 July 1994) is a Zimbabwean cricketer. He made his first-class debut for Southern Rocks in the 2013–14 Logan Cup on 24 February 2014. In February 2017, he was named in an academy squad by Zimbabwe Cricket to tour England later that year.

In June 2018, he was named in a Zimbabwe Select team for warm-up fixtures ahead of the 2018 Zimbabwe Tri-Nation Series. He made his Twenty20 debut for Mountaineers in the 2018–19 Stanbic Bank 20 Series on 11 March 2019. In December 2020, he was selected to play for the Southern Rocks in the 2020–21 Logan Cup alongside Shane Snater, Ben Curran and Club Captain Richmond Mutumbami.

In the 2022 season Tafadzwa went to the UK to join GMCL (Greater Manchester Cricket League) team Mottram CC as the club professional. After a successful debut season, he confirmed he would be returning to the Manchester based club in 2023, for a further season.

== Career ==
On 4 February 2023, Tsiga made his Test debut against the West Indies.
