= Nkosana Mpofu =

Zimbabwean cricketer (born 1990)

Personal information
- Born: 10 July 1990 (age 36); Bulawayo, Zimbabwe
- Source: ESPNcricinfo, 3 October 2016

Nkosana Mpofu (born 10 July 1990) is a Zimbabwean first-class cricketer who plays for Matabeleland Tuskers. Outside of Zimbabwe, he has also played cricket for Strabane Cricket Club in Ireland. In December 2020, he was selected to play for the Tuskers in the 2020–21 Logan Cup.
