= List of Zimbabwe One Day International cricket records =

One Day International (ODI) cricket is played between international cricket teams who are Full Members of the International Cricket Council (ICC) as well as the top four Associate members. Unlike Test matches, ODIs consist of one inning per team, having a limit in the number of overs, currently 50 overs per innings – although in the past this has been 55 or 60 overs. ODI cricket is List-A cricket, so statistics and records set in ODI matches also count toward List-A records. The earliest match recognised as an ODI was played between England and Australia in January 1971; since when there have been over 4,000 ODIs played by 28 teams. This is a list of Zimbabwe Cricket team's One Day International records that has been compiled using the List of One Day International cricket records. Zimbabwe played its first ever ODI in 1983.

== Key ==
The top five records are listed for each category, except for the team wins, losses, draws and ties, all round records and the partnership records. Tied records for fifth place are also included. Explanations of the general symbols and cricketing terms used in the list are given below. Specific details are provided in each category where appropriate. All records include matches played for Zimbabwe only, and are correct as of January 2022.

Key
Symbol	Meaning
†	Player or umpire is currently active in ODI cricket
‡	Even took place during Cricket World Cup and Qualifier
*	Player remained not out or partnership remained unbroken
♠	One Day International cricket record
Date	Starting date of the match
Innings	Number of innings played
Matches	Number of matches played
Opposition	The team Zimbabwe was playing against
Period	The time period when the player was active in ODI cricket
Player	The player involved in the record
Venue	One Day International cricket ground where the match was played

== Team records ==
=== Overall record ===
Matches	Won	Lost	Tied	NR	Win %
581	154	403	8	16	26.50
Last Updated: 18 February 2025

=== Team wins, losses, draws and ties ===
As of February 2025, Zimbabwe has played 581 ODI matches resulting in 154 victories, 403 defeats, 8 ties and 16 no results for an overall winning percentage of 26.50.

Opponent	Matches	Won	Lost	Tied	No Result	% Won	First	Last
Full Members
Afghanistan	31	10	20	0	0	32.25	2014	2024
Australia	33	3	29	0	1	6.9	1983	2022
Bangladesh	81	30	51	0	0	37.06	1997	2022
England	30	8	21	0	1	27.59	1992	2004
India	66	10	54	2	0	16.66	1983	2022
Ireland	25	10	11	1	3	40.00	2007	2025
New Zealand	38	9	27	1	1	25.68	1987	2015
Pakistan	65	5	56	2	2	7.69	1992	2024
South Africa	41	2	38	0	1	5	1992	2018
Sri Lanka	64	12	49	0	3	18.79	1992	2024
West Indies	49	11	36	1	1	22.91	1983	2023
Associate Members
Bermuda	2	2	0	0	0	100	2006	2006
Canada	2	2	0	0	0	100	2006	2011
Hong Kong	1	1	0	0	0	100	2018	2018
Kenya	32	25	5	0	2	83.33	1996	2011
Namibia	1	1	0	0	0	100	2003	2003
Netherlands	7	4	3	0	0	57.14	2003	2023
Nepal	1	1	0	0	0	100.00	2023	2023
Oman	1	1	0	0	0	100.00	2023	2023
Scotland	4	1	2	1	0	25.00	2017	2023
United Arab Emirates	6	5	1	0	0	83.33	2015	2019
United States	1	1	0	0	0	100.00	2023	2023
Total	581	154	403	8	16	26.50	1983	2025
Statistics are correct as of Zimbabwe v Ireland at Harare Sports Club, 3rd ODI, 18 February 2025.

=== First bilateral ODI series wins ===
Opponent	Year of first Home win	Year of first Away win
Afghanistan	—	—
Australia	—	—
Bangladesh	2001	2001
England	1996	YTP
India	1997	—
Ireland	2011	—
Kenya	2002	2008
Netherlands	2023	—
New Zealand	2001	2001
Pakistan	—	—
South Africa	—	—
Sri Lanka	—	2017
United Arab Emirates	2019	YTP
West Indies	—	—
Last updated: 1 July 2020

=== First ODI match wins ===
Opponent	Home		Away / Neutral	
Opponent	Venue	Year	Venue	Year
Afghanistan	Bulawayo	2014	Sharjah	2016
Australia	Harare	2014	Nottingham	1983 ‡
Bangladesh	Harare	2001	Nairobi	1997
Bermuda	YTP	YTP	Port of Spain	2006
Canada	YTP	YTP	Port of Spain	2006
England	Bulawayo	1996	Albury	1992 ‡
Hong Kong	Bulawayo	2018	YTP	YTP
India	Bulawayo	1997	Centurion	1997
Ireland	Harare	2010	Nairobi	2008
Kenya	Kwekwe	2002	Patna	1996 ‡
Namibia	Harare	2003 ‡	YTP	YTP
Nepal	Harare	2023	YTP	YTP
Netherlands	Bulawayo	2003 ‡	—	—
New Zealand	Harare	1997	Napier	1996
Oman	Bulawayo	2023 ‡	YTP	YTP
Pakistan	Harare	1995	Sheikhupura	1998
South Africa	—	—	Chelmsford	1999 ‡
Scotland	—	—	Edinburgh	2017
Sri Lanka	Harare	1994	Sharjah	1997
United Arab Emirates	Harare	2019	Nelson	2015 ‡
United States	Harare	2023 ‡	YTP	YTP
West Indies	Bulawayo	2003	Bristol	2000
Last updated: 1 July 2020

=== Winning every match in a series ===
In a bilateral series winning all matches is referred to as whitewash. First such event occurred when West Indies toured England in 1976. Zimbabwe have recorded five such series victories.

Opposition	Matches	Host	Season
England	3	Zimbabwe	1996/97
Bangladesh	3	Zimbabwe	2000–01
Bangladesh	3	Bangladesh	2001–02
Kenya	5	Kenya	2008–09
United Arab Emirates	4	Zimbabwe	2019
Last updated: 1 July 2020

=== Losing every match in a series ===
Zimbabwe have also suffered such whitewash 34 times.

Opposition	Matches	Host	Season
India	3	India	1992/93
Pakistan	3	Pakistan	1993/94
Pakistan	3	Pakistan	1996/97
Sri Lanka	3	Sri Lanka	1997/98
Australia	3	Zimbabwe	1999–00
England	3	Zimbabwe	1999–00
South Africa	3	Zimbabwe	2001–02
England	5	Zimbabwe	2001–02
Pakistan	5	Zimbabwe	2002–03
Sri Lanka	5	Zimbabwe	2004
Australia	3	Zimbabwe	2004
England	4	Zimbabwe	2004–05
South Africa	3	South Africa	2004–05
South Africa	3	South Africa	2006–07
Bangladesh	5	Bangladesh	2006–07
South Africa	3	Zimbabwe	2007
Pakistan	5	Pakistan	2007–08
Sri Lanka	5	Zimbabwe	2008–09
South Africa	3	South Africa	2010–11
Pakistan	3	Zimbabwe	2011
New Zealand	3	New Zealand	2011–12
West Indies	3	West Indies	2012–13
India	5	Zimbabwe	2013
South Africa	3	Zimbabwe	2014
Bangladesh	5	Bangladesh	2014–15
India	3	Zimbabwe	2015
Bangladesh	3	Bangladesh	2015–16
India	3	Zimbabwe	2016
Pakistan	5	Zimbabwe	2018
South Africa	3	South Africa	2018–19
Bangladesh	3	Bangladesh	2018–19
Ireland	3	Ireland	2019
Bangladesh	3	Bangladesh	2019–20
Bangladesh	3	Zimbabwe	2021
Afghanistan	3	Zimbabwe	2022
India	3	Zimbabwe	2022
Last updated: 23 August 2022

=== Team scoring records ===
==== Most runs in an innings ====
The highest innings total scored in ODIs came in the match between England and Australia in June 2018. Playing in the third ODI at Trent Bridge in Nottingham, the hosts posted a total of 481/6. The second ODI against Kenya in January 2009 saw Zimbabwe set their highest innings total of 351/7.

Rank	Score	Opposition	Venue	Date	Scorecard
1	408/6	United States	Harare Sports Club, Harare, Zimbabwe	26 June 2023 ‡	Scorecard
2	351/7	Kenya	Mombasa Sports Club Ground, Mombasa, Kenya	29 January 2009	Scorecard
3	340/2	Namibia	Harare Sports Club, Harare, Zimbabwe	10 February 2003 ‡	Scorecard
4	338/7	Bermuda	Queen's Park Oval, Port of Spain, Trinidad & Tobago	18 May 2006	Scorecard
5	334/5	Pakistan	Gaddafi Stadium, Lahore, Pakistan	26 May 2015	Scorecard
Last updated: 26 June 2023

==== Fewest runs in an innings ====
The lowest innings total scored in ODIs has been scored twice. Zimbabwe were dismissed for 35 by Sri Lanka during the third ODI in Sri Lanka's tour of Zimbabwe in April 2004 and USA were dismissed for same score by Nepal in the sixth ODI of the 2020 ICC Cricket World League 2 in Nepal in February 2020.

Rank	Score	Opposition	Venue	Date	Scorecard
1	35	Sri Lanka	Harare Sports Club, Harare, Zimbabwe	25 April 2004	Scorecard
2	38	Sri Lanka	Sinhalese Sports Club Ground, Colombo, Sri Lanka	8 December 2001	Scorecard
3	44	Bangladesh	Zohur Ahmed Chowdhury Stadium, Chittagong, Bangladesh	3 November 2009	Scorecard
4	54	Afghanistan	Harare Sports Club, Harare, Zimbabwe	26 February 2017	Scorecard
5	65	India	Harare Sports Club, Harare, Zimbabwe	29 August 2005	Scorecard
Last updated: 1 July 2020

==== Most runs conceded an innings ====
The third ODI of the 2006 ODI Series against the South Africa saw Zimbabwe concede their highest innings total of 418/5.

Rank	Score	Opposition	Venue	Date	Scorecard
1	418/5	South Africa	North West Cricket Stadium, Potchefstroom, South Africa	20 September 2006	Scorecard
2	399/6	South Africa	Willowmoore Park, Benoni, South Africa	22 October 2010	Scorecard
3	399/1	Pakistan	Queens Sports Club, Bulawayo, Zimbabwe	20 July 2018	Scorecard
4	397/5	New Zealand	Queens Sports Club, Bulawayo, Zimbabwe	24 August 2005	Scorecard
5	375/3	Pakistan	Gaddafi Stadium, Lahore, Pakistan	26 May 2015	Scorecard
Last updated: 1 July 2020

==== Fewest runs conceded in an innings ====
The lowest score conceded by Zimbabwe for a full inning is 75 scored by Canada in the Associate Tri-Nation Series in West Indies in 2006 at Port of Spain.

Rank	Score	Opposition	Venue	Date	Scorecard
1	75	Canada	Queen's Park Oval, Port of Spain, Trinidad & Tobago	16 May 2006	Scorecard
2	91	West Indies	Sydney Cricket Ground, Sydney, Australia	23 January 2001	Scorecard
3	92	Bangladesh	Aga Khan Sports Club Ground, Nairobi, Kenya	14 October 1997	Scorecard
4	103	Bangladesh	Harare Sports Club, Harare, Zimbabwe	8 April 2001	Scorecard
5	104	Ireland	Harare Sports Club, Harare, Zimbabwe	16 March 2018	Scorecard
5	104	United States	Harare Sports Club, Harare, Zimbabwe	26 June 2023	Scorecard
Last updated: 1 July 2020

==== Most runs aggregate in a match ====
The highest match aggregate scored in ODIs came in the match between South Africa and Australia in the fifth ODI of March 2006 series at Wanderers Stadium, Johannesburg when South Africa scored 438/9 in response to Australia's 434/4. The first ODI against Pakistan in | Gaddafi Stadium, Lahore saw a total of 709 runs being scored.

Rank	Aggregate	Scores	Venue	Date	Scorecard
1	709/8	Pakistan (375/3) v Zimbabwe (334/5)	Gaddafi Stadium, Lahore, Pakistan	26 May 2015	Scorecard
2	665/9	South Africa (418/5) v Zimbabwe (247/4)	North West Cricket Stadium, Potchefstroom, South Africa	20 September 2006	Scorecard
3	661/12	West Indies (372/2) v Zimbabwe (289)	Manuka Oval, Canberra, Australia	24 February 2015 ‡	Scorecard
4	657/18	Ireland (331/8) v Zimbabwe (326)	Bellerive Oval, Hobart, Australia	7 March 2015 ‡	Scorecard
4	657/14	New Zealand (328/5) v Zimbabwe (329/9)	Queens Sports Club, Bulawayo, Zimbabwe	25 October 2011	Scorecard
Last updated: 1 July 2020

==== Fewest runs aggregate in a match ====
The lowest match aggregate in ODIs is 71 when USA were dismissed for 35 by Nepal in the sixth ODI of the 2020 ICC Cricket World League 2 in Nepal in February 2020. The lowest match aggregate in ODI history for Zimbabwe is 75 scored in the third match of the Sri Lanka's tour of Zimbabwe in 2004.

Rank	Aggregate	Scores	Venue	Date	Scorecard
1	75/11	Zimbabwe (35) v Sri Lanka (40/1)	Harare Sports Club, Harare, Zimbabwe	25 April 2004	Scorecard
2	78/11	Zimbabwe (38) v Sri Lanka (40/1)	Sinhalese Sports Club Ground, Colombo, Sri Lanka	8 December 2001	Scorecard
3	93/14	Zimbabwe (44) v Bangladesh (49/4)	Zohur Ahmed Chowdhury Stadium, Chittagong, Bangladesh	3 November 2009	Scorecard
4	135/11	Zimbabwe (67) v Sri Lanka (68/1)	Harare Sports Club, Harare, Zimbabwe	22 November 2008	Scorecard
5	136/11	Zimbabwe (67) v Pakistan (69/1)	Queens Sports Club, Bulawayo, Zimbabwe	18 July 2018	Scorecard
Last updated: 1 July 2020

=== Result records ===
An ODI match is won when one side has scored more runs than the total runs scored by the opposing side during their innings. If both sides have completed both their allocated innings and the side that fielded last has the higher aggregate of runs, it is known as a win by runs. This indicates the number of runs that they had scored more than the opposing side. If the side batting last wins the match, it is known as a win by wickets, indicating the number of wickets that were still to fall.

==== Greatest win margins (by runs) ====
The greatest winning margin by runs in ODIs was England's victory over South Africa by 342 runs in the third and final ODI of South Africa's 2025 tour of England. The largest victory recorded by Zimbabwe was during the Cricket World Qualifier in 2023 against United States of America by 308 runs.

Rank	Margin	Target	Opposition	Venue	Date
1	304 Runs	409	United States	Harare Sports Club, Harare, Zimbabwe	26 June 2023
2	202 Runs	326	Kenya	Bangabandhu National Stadium, Dhaka, Bangladesh	27 March 1999
3	194 Runs	339	Bermuda	Queen's Park Oval, Port of Spain, Trinidad & Tobago	18 May 2006
4	192 Runs	285	Bangladesh	Aga Khan Sports Club Ground, Nairobi, Kenya	14 October 1997
5	175 Runs	299	Canada	Vidarbha Cricket Association Stadium, Nagpur, India	28 February 2011 ‡
Last updated: 1 July 2020

==== Greatest win margins (by balls remaining) ====
The greatest winning margin by balls remaining in ODIs was England's victory over Canada by 8 wickets with 277 balls remaining in the 1979 Cricket World Cup. The largest victory recorded by Zimbabwe is during the Kenya's tour of Zimbabwe in December 2002 when they won by 9 wickets with 204 balls remaining.

Rank	Balls remaining	Margin	Opposition	Venue	Date
1	204	9 wickets	Kenya	Queens Sports Club, Bulawayo, Zimbabwe	15 December 2002
2	161	7 wickets	United Arab Emirates	Harare Sports Club, Harare, Zimbabwe	10 April 2019
3	160	8 wickets	Afghanistan	Queens Sports Club, Bulawayo, Zimbabwe	16 October 2015
4	122	6 wickets	West Indies	Queens Sports Club, Bulawayo, Zimbabwe	23 November 2003
5	118	7 wickets	Afghanistan	Harare Sports Club, Harare, Zimbabwe	24 February 2017
Last updated: 1 July 2020

==== Greatest win margins (by wickets) ====
A total of 55 matches have ended with chasing team winning by 10 wickets with West Indies winning by such margins a record 10 times. Zimbabwe have not won an ODI match by this margin.

Rank	Margin	Opposition	Venue	Date
1	9 Wickets	Kenya	Queens Sports Club, Bulawayo, Zimbabwe	15 December 2002
2	8 Wickets	India	Queens Sports Club, Bulawayo, Zimbabwe	15 February 1997
2	8 Wickets	Kenya	Queens Sports Club, Bulawayo, Zimbabwe	25 February 2006
2	8 Wickets	Bangladesh	Harare Sports Club, Harare, Zimbabwe	6 February 2007
2	8 Wickets	Sri Lanka	Harare Sports Club, Harare, Zimbabwe	7 June 2010
2	8 Wickets	Afghanistan	Queens Sports Club, Bulawayo, Zimbabwe	20 July 2014
2	8 Wickets	Afghanistan	Queens Sports Club, Bulawayo, Zimbabwe	16 October 2015
2	8 Wickets	Nepal	Harare Sports Club, Harare, Zimbabwe	18 June 2023
Last updated: 3 December 2017

==== Highest successful run chases ====
South Africa holds the record for the highest successful run chase which they achieved when they scored 438/9 in response to Australia's 434/9. Zimbabwe's highest innings total while chasing is 329/9 in a successful run chase against New Zealand at Bulawayo, Zimbabwe during the New Zealand's tour of Zimbabwe in October 2011.

Rank	Score	Target	Opposition	Venue	Date
1	329/9	329	New Zealand	Queens Sports Club, Bulawayo, Zimbabwe	25 October 2011
2	322/4	317	Sri Lanka	Galle International Stadium, Galle, Sri Lanka	30 June 2017
3	319/4	316	Netherlands	Harare Sports Club, Harare, Zimbabwe	20 June 2023
4	304/3	304	New Zealand	Harare Sports Club, Harare, Zimbabwe	2 August 2015
4	307/5	304	Bangladesh	Harare Sports Club, Harare, Zimbabwe	5 August 2022
Last updated: 21 June 2023

==== Narrowest win margins (by runs) ====
The narrowest run margin victory is by 1 run which has been achieved in 31 ODI's with Australia winning such games a record 6 times. Zimbabwe's has achieved victory by 1 run twice.

Rank	Margin	Opposition	Venue	Date
1	1 run	New Zealand	AMI Stadium, Christchurch, New Zealand	4 March 1998
1	1 run	Netherlands	Harare Sports Club, Harare, Zimbabwe	23 March 2023
2	2 Runs	Sri Lanka	Harare Sports Club, Harare, Zimbabwe	5 November 1994
2	2 Runs	West Indies	Providence Stadium, Providence, Guyana	4 March 2010
2	2 Runs	Afghanistan	Queens Sports Club, Bulawayo, Zimbabwe	6 March 2018
5	3 Runs	India	Grace Road, Leicester, England	19 May 1999 ‡
5	3 Runs	Afghanistan	Harare Sports Club, Harare, Zimbabwe	21 February 2017
Last updated: 1 July 2020

==== Narrowest win margins (by balls remaining) ====
The narrowest winning margin by balls remaining in ODIs is by winning of the last ball which has been achieved 36 times with both South Africa winning seven times. Zimbabwe has achieved a victory by this margin on three occasions.

Rank	Balls remaining	Margin	Opposition	Venue	Date
1	0	2 wickets	South Africa	Sahara Stadium, Kingsmead, Durban, South Africa	2 February 2000
1	0	2 wickets	Bangladesh	Harare Sports Club, Harare, Zimbabwe	2 August 2006
1	0	2 wickets	Ireland	Harare Sports Club, Harare, Zimbabwe	26 September 2010
4	1	1 wicket	India	Barkatullah Khan Stadium, Jodhpur, India	8 December 2000
4	1	1 wicket	New Zealand	Queens Sports Club, Bulawayo, Zimbabwe	25 October 2011
Last updated: 1 July 2020

==== Narrowest win margins (by wickets) ====
The narrowest margin of victory by wickets is 1 wicket which has settled 55 such ODIs. Both West Indies and New Zealand have recorded such victory on eight occasions. Zimbabwe has won the match by a margin of one wicket on four occasions.

Rank	Margin	Opposition	Venue	Date
1	1 wicket	India	Barkatullah Khan Stadium, Jodhpur, India	8 December 2000
1	1 wicket	New Zealand	Eden Park, Auckland, New Zealand	7 January 2001
1	1 wicket	India	Nahar Singh Stadium, Faridabad, India	7 March 2002
1	1 wicket	New Zealand	Queens Sports Club, Bulawayo, Zimbabwe	25 October 2011
5	2 wicket	England	Queens Sports Club, Bulawayo, Zimbabwe	15 December 1996
5	2 wicket	South Africa	Sahara Stadium, Kingsmead, Durban, South Africa	2 February 2000
5	2 wicket	Bangladesh	Harare Sports Club, Harare, Zimbabwe	29 July 2006
5	2 wicket	Bangladesh	Harare Sports Club, Harare, Zimbabwe	2 August 2006
5	2 wicket	Bangladesh	Shere-e-Bangla Stadium, Mirpur, Bangladesh	19 January 2009
5	2 wicket	Ireland	Harare Sports Club, Harare, Zimbabwe	26 September 2010
5	2 wicket	Ireland	Harare Sports Club, Harare, Zimbabwe	9 October 2015
Last updated: 1 July 2020

==== Greatest loss margins (by runs) ====
Zimbabwe's biggest defeat by runs was against South Africa in the Zimbabwe's tour of South Africa in October 2010 at Willowmoore Park, Benoni, South Africa.

Rank	Margin	Opposition	Venue	Date
1	272 Runs	South Africa	Willowmoore Park, Benoni, South Africa	22 October 2010
2	244 Runs	Pakistan	Queens Sports Club, Bulawayo, Zimbabwe	20 July 2018
3	212 Runs	South Africa	Centurion Park, Centurion, South Africa	10 November 2009
4	202 Runs	New Zealand	McLean Park, Napier, New Zealand	9 February 2012
5	201 Runs	Pakistan	Queens Sports Club, Bulawayo, Zimbabwe	13 July 2018
Last updated: 1 July 2020

==== Greatest loss margins (by balls remaining) ====
The greatest winning margin by balls remaining in ODIs was England's victory over Canada by 8 wickets with 277 balls remaining in the 1979 Cricket World Cup. The largest defeat suffered by Zimbabwe was during the Zimbabwe's tour of Sri Lanka in 2001 when they lost by 9 wickets with 274 balls remaining.

Rank	Balls remaining	Margin	Opposition	Venue	Date
1	274	9 wickets	Sri Lanka	Sinhalese Sports Club Ground, Colombo, Sri Lanka	8 December 2001
2	244	9 wickets	Sri Lanka	Harare Sports Club, Harare, Zimbabwe	25 April 2004
3	241	9 wickets	Pakistan	Queens Sports Club, Bulawayo, Zimbabwe	18 July 2018
4	229	6 wickets	Bangladesh	Zohur Ahmed Chowdhury Stadium, Chittagong, Bangladesh	3 November 2009
5	214	9 wickets	West Indies	Sardar Patel Stadium, Ahmedabad, India	8 October 2006
Last updated: 1 July 2020

==== Greatest loss margins (by wickets) ====
Zimbabwe have lost an ODI match by a margin of 10 wickets on nine occasions with most recent being during the fourth match of the India tour of Zimbabwe in 2022.

Rank	Margins	Opposition	Most recent venue	Date
1	10 wickets	West Indies	Edgbaston, Birmingham, England	20 June 1983 ‡
1	10 wickets	India	Sharjah Cricket Stadium, Sharjah, United Arab Emirates	13 November 1998
1	10 wickets	West Indies	Darren Sammy National Cricket Stadium, Gros Islet, Saint Lucia	10 May 2006
1	10 wickets	New Zealand	Sardar Patel Stadium, Ahmedabad, India	4 March 2011 ‡
1	10 wickets	Pakistan	Harare Sports Club, Harare, Zimbabwe	11 September 2011
1	10 wickets	New Zealand	Harare Sports Club, Harare, Zimbabwe	4 August 2015
1	10 wickets	India	Harare Sports Club, Harare, Zimbabwe	15 June 2016
1	10 wickets	Afghanistan	Sharjah Cricket Stadium, Sharjah, United Arab Emirates	16 February 2018
1	10 wickets	India	Harare Sports Club, Harare, Zimbabwe	18 August 2022
Last updated: 1 July 2020

==== Narrowest loss margins (by runs) ====
The narrowest loss of Zimbabwe in terms of runs is by 1 run suffered once.

Rank	Margin	Opposition	Venue	Date
1	1 run	Australia	WACA, Perth, Australia	4 February 2001
2	2 Runs	New Zealand	Eden Park, Auckland, New Zealand	8 March 1998
3	3 Runs	New Zealand	Lal Bahadur Shastri Stadium, Hyderabad, India	10 October 1987 ‡
3	3 Runs	India	Adelaide Oval, Adelaide, Australia	24 January 2004
3	3 Runs	United Arab Emirates	Harare Sports Club, Harare, Zimbabwe	22 March 2018
Last updated: 1 July 2020

==== Narrowest loss margins (by balls remaining) ====
The narrowest winning margin by balls remaining in ODIs is by winning of the last ball which has been achieved 36 times with both South Africa winning seven times. Zimbabwe has suffered loss by this margin once.

Rank	Balls remaining	Margin	Opposition	Venue	Date
1	0	5 wickets	New Zealand	Bangabandhu National Stadium, Dhaka, Bangladesh	24 October 1998
2	1	5 wickets	West Indies	Queens Sports Club, Bulawayo, Zimbabwe	1 July 2001
2	1	3 wickets	Netherlands	Harare Sports Club, Harare, Zimbabwe	21 March 2023
3	2	6 wickets	Pakistan	Rawalpindi Cricket Stadium, Rawalpindi, Pakistan	25 December 1993
3	2	2 wickets	Afghanistan	Queens Sports Club, Bulawayo, Zimbabwe	22 July 2014
3	2	2 wickets	Afghanistan	Sharjah Cricket Stadium, Sharjah, United Arab Emirates	6 January 2016
Last updated: 1 July 2020

==== Narrowest loss margins (by wickets) ====
Zimbabwe has suffered defeat by 1 wicket on four occasions.

Rank	Margin	Opposition	Venue	Date
1	1 wicket	England	Queens Sports Club, Bulawayo, Zimbabwe	18 February 2000
1	1 wicket	West Indies	Brisbane Cricket Ground, Brisbane, Australia	13 January 2001
1	1 wicket	Bangladesh	Harare Sports Club, Harare, Zimbabwe	10 February 2007
1	1 wicket	Bangladesh	Zohur Ahmed Chowdhury Stadium, Chittagong, Bangladesh	5 November 2009
5	2 wickets	Australia	WACA, Perth, Australia	2 December 1994
5	2 wickets	Sri Lanka	Harare Sports Club, Harare, Zimbabwe	28 November 2008
5	2 wickets	Afghanistan	Queens Sports Club, Bulawayo, Zimbabwe	22 July 2014
5	2 wickets	Ireland	Harare Sports Club, Harare, Zimbabwe	13 October 2015
5	2 wickets	Afghanistan	Sharjah Cricket Stadium, Sharjah, United Arab Emirates	6 January 2016
Last updated: 1 July 2020

==== Tied matches ====
A tie can occur when the scores of both teams are equal at the conclusion of play, provided that the side batting last has completed their innings. There have been 37 ties in ODIs history with Zimbabwe involved in seven such games.

Opposition	Venue	Date
India	Nehru Stadium, Indore, India	18 November 1993
Pakistan	Harare Sports Club, Harare, Zimbabwe	22 February 1995
India	Boland Park, Paarl, South Africa	27 January 1997
New Zealand	Queens Sports Club, Bulawayo, Zimbabwe	1 October 1997
Ireland	Sabina Park, Kingston, Jamaica	15 March 2007 ‡
West Indies	Queens Sports Club, Bulawayo, Zimbabwe	19 November 2016
Scotland	Queens Sports Club, Bulawayo, Zimbabwe	12 March 2018
Pakistan	Rawalpindi Cricket Stadium, Rawalpindi, Pakistan	3 November 2020
Last updated: 4 November 2017

== Individual records ==
=== Batting records ===
==== Most career runs ====
Rank	Runs	Player	Matches	Innings	Period
1	6,786	Andy Flower	213	208	1992–2003
2	6,704	Brendan Taylor†	207	205	2004–2025
3	6,571	Grant Flower	221	214	1992–2010
4	5,658	Hamilton Masakadza	209	208	2001–2019
5	5,217	Sean Williams†	164	159	2005–2025
6	5,185	Alistair Campbell	188	184	1992–2003
7	4,325	Sikandar Raza†	150	142	2013–2025
8	4,289	Elton Chigumbura	210	195	2004–2018
9	3,600	Craig Ervine†	128	124	2010–2025
10	3,383	Tatenda Taibu	149	136	2001–2012
Last updated: 31 August 2025

==== Fastest runs getter ====
Runs	Batsman	Match	Innings	Record Date	Reference
1000	Neil Johnson	28	28	21 October 1999	
2000	Grant Flower	66	64	24 January 1998	
3000	Grant Flower	92	90	27 March 1999	
4000	Grant Flower	130	128	16 July 2000	
5000	Andy Flower	165	162	25 January 2001	
6000	Brendan Taylor	185	184	6 October 2018	

==== Most runs in each batting position ====
Batting position	Batsman	Innings	Runs	Average	Career Span	Ref
Opener	Grant Flower	137	4,409	33.15	1992–2010	
Number 3	Hamilton Masakadza	63	1,768	28.51	2001–2019	
Number 4	Brendan Taylor	82	2,910	37.79	2005–2021	
Number 5	Sean Williams†	68	2,105	35.08	2006–2024	
Number 6	Elton Chigumbura	57	1,220	23.92	2005–2018	
Number 7	Elton Chigumbura	80	1,811	28.29	2004–2018	
Number 8	Heath Streak	58	1,147	29.41	1993–2005	
Number 9	Graeme Cremer	29	352	19.55	2009–2017	
Number 10	Ray Price	32	203	9.66	2002–2012	
Number 11	Douglas Hondo	17	52	7.42	2001–2004	
Last updated: 23 August 2022.

==== Most runs against each team ====
Opposition	Runs	Batsman	Innings	Average	Career Span	Ref
Afghanistan	765	Sikandar Raza†	23	36.42	2014–2022	
Australia	562	Grant Flower	18	31.22	1994–2004	
Bangladesh	1,508	Brendan Taylor	55	29.00	2005–2021	
Bermuda	194	Vusi Sibanda	2	97.00	2006–2006	
Canada	98	Tatenda Taibu	1	98.00	2011–2011	
England	733	Grant Flower	23	40.72	1994–2003	
Hong Kong	84	Hamilton Masakadza	1	84.00	2018–2018	
India	1,298	Andy Flower	35	40.56	1992–2003	
Ireland	713	Craig Ervine†	17	50.92	2010–2025	
Kenya	794	Hamilton Masakadza	15	66.16	2006–2009	
Namibia	172	Craig Wishart	1	—	2003–2003	
Nepal	121	Craig Ervine†	1	—	2023–2023	
Netherlands	238	Sikandar Raza†	6	79.33	2019–2023	
New Zealand	816	Alistair Campbell	21	42.94	1992–2021	
Pakistan	906	Grant Flower	28	34.84	1993–2003	
Scotland	121	Ryan Burl†	3	60.50	2017–2023	
South Africa	587	Brendan Taylor	22	29.35	2005–2018	
Sri Lanka	919	Andy Flower	27	38.29	1992–2003	
United Arab Emirates	307	Sean Williams†	6	102.33	2015–2019	
West Indies	573	Brendan Taylor	22	28.65	2006–2018	
United States	174	Sean Williams†	1	—	2023–2023	
Oman	142	Sean Williams†	1	142.00	2023–2023	
Last updated: 18 February 2025

==== Highest individual score ====
The fourth ODI of the Sri Lanka's tour of India in 2014 saw Rohit Sharma score the highest Individual score. Charles Coventry holds the Zimbabwean record when he scored 194* against Bangladesh in the fourth ODI of the 2009 series.

Rank	Runs	Player	Opposition	Venue	Date
1	194*	Charles Coventry	Bangladesh	Queens Sports Club, Bulawayo, Zimbabwe	16 August 2009
2	178*	Hamilton Masakadza	Kenya	Harare Sports Club, Harare, Zimbabwe	18 October 2009
3	174	Sean Williams†	United States	Harare Sports Club, Harare, Zimbabwe	26 June 2023 ‡
4	172*	Craig Wishart	Namibia	Harare Sports Club, Harare, Zimbabwe	10 February 2003 ‡
5	169	Brian Bennett†	Ireland	Harare Sports Club, Harare, Zimbabwe	14 February 2025
Last updated: 14 February 2025

==== Highest individual score – progression of record ====
Runs	Player	Opponent	Venue	Season
69*	Duncan Fletcher	Australia	Trent Bridge, Nottingham, England	1983 ‡
71*	Duncan Fletcher	West Indies	New Road, Worcester, England	1983 ‡
84	David Houghton	Australia	Rose Bowl, Southampton, England	1983 ‡
142	David Houghton	New Zealand	Lal Bahadur Shastri Stadium, Hyderabad, India	1987–88 ‡
142*	Grant Flower	Bangladesh	Queens Sports Club, Bulawayo, Zimbabwe	2001
142*	Andy Flower	England	Harare Sports Club, Harare, Zimbabwe	2001–02
145	Andy Flower	India	Ranasinghe Premadasa Stadium, Colombo, Sri Lanka	2002
172*	Craig Wishart	Namibia	Harare Sports Club, Harare, Zimbabwe	2002–03 ‡
194*	Charles Coventry	Bangladesh	Queens Sports Club, Bulawayo, Zimbabwe	2009
Last updated: 1 July 2020

==== Highest score against each opponent ====
Opposition	Player	Score	Date
Afghanistan	Sikandar Raza†	141	20 July 2014
Australia	Neil Johnson	132*	9 June 1999 ‡
Bangladesh	Charles Coventry	194*	16 August 2009
Bermuda	Vusi Sibanda	116	20 May 2006
Canada	Tatenda Taibu	98	28 February 2011 ‡
England	Andy Flower	142*	7 October 2001
Hong Kong	Hamilton Masakadza	84	10 March 2018
India	Andy Flower	145	14 September 2002
Ireland	Brian Bennett†	169	14 February 2025
Kenya	Hamilton Masakadza	178*	18 October 2009
Namibia	Craig Wishart	172*	10 February 2003 ‡
Nepal	Craig Ervine†	121*	18 June 2023
Netherlands	Sikandar Raza†	102*	20 June 2023
New Zealand	David Houghton	142	10 October 1987 ‡
Pakistan	Sean Williams†	118*	3 November 2020
South Africa	Brendan Taylor	145*	15 October 2010
Scotland	Malcolm Waller	92	15 June 2017
Sri Lanka	Alistair Campbell	131*	5 November 1994
United Arab Emirates	Sean Williams†	109*	14 April 2019
West Indies	Brendan Taylor	138	19 March 2018
United States	Sean Williams†	174	26 June 2023 ‡
Oman	Sean Williams†	142	29 June 2023 ‡
Last updated: 14 February 2025

==== Highest career average ====
Rank	Average	Player	Innings	Runs	Not out	Period
1	37.53	Sean Williams†	159	5,217	20	2005–2024
2	36.50	Neil Johnson	48	1,679	2	1998–2000
3	36.04	Sikandar Raza†	142	4,325	22	2013–2025
4	35.55	Brednan Taylor	203	6,684	15	2004–2021
5	35.34	Andy Flower	208	6,786	16	1992–2003
Qualification: 20 innings. Last updated: 31 August 2025

==== Highest Average in each batting position ====
Batting position	Batsman	Innings	Runs	Average	Career Span	Ref
Opener	Neil Johnson	42	1516	37.90	1998–2000	
Number 3	Brendan Taylor	33	1258	43.37	2004–2021	
Number 4	Brendan Taylor	82	2910	37.79	2004–2021	
Number 5	Sikandar Raza†	44	1682	50.96	2015–2023	
Number 6	Sikandar Raza†	40	1100	31.42	2015–2022	
Number 7	Heath Streak	40	864	30.85	1993–2005	
Number 8	Heath Streak	58	1147	29.41	1993–2005	
Number 9	Heath Streak	29	333	19.58	1993–2005	
Number 10	Gary Brent	20	120	12.00	1996–2008	
Number 11	Henry Olonga	21	51	6.37	1995–2003	
Last updated: 23 June 2023. Qualification: Min 20 innings batted at position

==== Most half-centuries ====
A half-century is a score of between 50 and 99 runs. Statistically, once a batsman's score reaches 100, it is no longer considered a half-century but a century.

Sachin Tendulkar of India has scored the most half-centuries in ODIs with 96. He is followed by the Sri Lanka's Kumar Sangakkara on 93, South Africa's Jacques Kallis on 86 and India's Rahul Dravid and Zimbabwe's Inzamam-ul-Haq on 83.

Rank	Half centuries	Player	Innings	Runs	Period
1	55	Andy Flower	208	6,786	1992–2003
2	40	Grant Flower	214	6,571	1992–2010
3	39	Brendan Taylor	203	6,684	2004–2021
4	37	Sean Williams†	159	5,217	2005–2025
5	34	Hamilton Masakadza	208	5,658	2001–2019
Last updated: 31 August 2025

==== Most centuries ====
A century is a score of 100 or more runs in a single innings.

Tendulkar has also scored the most centuries in ODIs with 49. Brendan Taylor has the most centuries for Zimbabwe.

Rank	Centuries	Player	Innings	Runs	Period
1	11	Brendan Taylor	203	6,684	2004–2021
2	8	Sean Williams†	159	5,217	2005–2025
3	7	Alistair Campbell	184	5,185	1992–2003
3	7	Sikandar Raza†	142	4,325	2013–2025
4	6	Grant Flower	214	6,571	1992–2010
5	5	Hamilton Masakadza	208	5,658	2001–2019
Last updated: 16 February 2025

==== Most Sixes ====
Rank	Sixes	Player	Innings	Runs	Period
1	106	Brendan Taylor	203	6,684	2004–2021
2	105	Elton Chigumbura	195	4,289	2004–2018
3	105	Sikandar Raza†	142	4,325	2013–2025
4	86	Hamilton Masakadza	208	5,658	2001–2019
5	48	Heath Streak	157	2,901	1993–2005
Last updated: 4 July 2023

==== Most Fours ====
Rank	Fours	Player	Innings	Runs	Period
1	599	Brendan Taylor	203	6,684	2004–2021
2	585	Hamilton Masakadza	208	5,658	2001–2019
3	557+	Grant Flower	214	6,571	1992–2010
4	532+	Andy Flower	208	6,786	1992–2003
5	470	Sean Williams†	159	5,217	2005–2025
Last updated: 31 August 2025

==== Highest strike rates ====
Andre Russell of West Indies holds the record for highest strike rate, with minimum 500 balls faced qualification, with 130.22. Andy Blignaut is the Zimbabwean with the highest strike rate.

Rank	Strike rate	Player	Runs	Balls Faced	Period
1	106.28	Andy Blignaut	626	589	1999–2010
2	88.68	Charles Coventry	831	937	2003–2015
3	86.95	Sean Williams†	5,217	6,000	2005–2025
4	85.74	SIkandar Raza†	4,325	5044	2013–2025
5	85.53	Sean Ervine	698	816	2001–2004
Qualification= 500 balls faced. Last updated: 31 August 2025

==== Highest strike rates in an inning ====
James Franklin of New Zealand's strike rate of 387.50 during his 31* off 8 balls against Canada during 2011 Cricket World Cup is the world record for highest strike rate in an innings. Elton Chigumbura holds the top position for a Zimbabwe player in this list with his innings of 27 off 11 balls against Pakistan during the 2007 Cricket World Cup.

Rank	Strike rate	Player	Runs	Balls Faced	Opposition	Venue	Date
1	245.45	Elton Chigumbura	27	11	Pakistan	Sabina Park, Kingston, Jamaica	21 March 2007 ‡
2	234.48	Elton Chigumbura	68	29	Kenya	Mombasa Sports Club Ground, Mombasa, Kenya	29 January 2009
3	233.33	Dougie Marillier	56*	24	India	Nahar Singh Stadium, Faridabad, India	7 March 2002
4	221.43	Sean Ervine	31*	14	New Zealand	Goodyear Park, Bloemfontein, South Africa	8 March 2003 ‡
5	207.89	Elton Chigumbura	79	38	Kenya	Mombasa Sports Club Ground, Mombasa, Kenya	27 January 2009
Last updated: 1 July 2020

==== Most runs in a calendar year ====
Tendulkar holds the record for most runs scored in a calendar year with 1894 runs scored in 1998. Grant Flower scored 1116 runs in 2001, the most for a Zimbabwe batsmen in a year.

Rank	Runs	Player	Matches	Innings	Year
1	1116	Grant Flower	33	33	2001
2	1087	Hamilton Masakadza	27	27	2009
3	1082	Stuart Carlisle	36	36	2001
4	1060	Andy Flower	33	33	2001
5	960	Alistair Campbell	28	28	2000
Last updated: 1 July 2020

==== Most runs in a series ====
The 1980-81 Benson & Hedges World Series Cup in Australia saw Greg Chappell set the record for the most runs scored in a single series scoring 685 runs. He is followed by Sachin Tendulkar with 673 runs scored in the 2003 Cricket World Cup. Hamilton Masakadza has scored the most runs in a series for a Zimbabwe batsmen, when he scored 467 runs in the Kenya in Zimbabwe in 2009-10.

Rank	Runs	Player	Matches	Innings	Series
1	600	Sean Williams†	7	7	2023 Cricket World Cup Qualifier
2	467	Hamilton Masakadza	5	5	Kenya in Zimbabwe in 2009-10
3	433	Brendan Taylor	6	6	2015 Cricket World Cup
4	375	Andy Flower	6	6	President's Cup 1997-98
5	367	Neil Johnson	8	8	1999 Cricket World Cup
Last updated: 11 July 2023

==== Most ducks ====
A duck refers to a batsman being dismissed without scoring a run. Sanath Jayasuriya has scored the equal highest number of ducks in ODIs with 34 such knocks. Grant Flower with 18 ducks has the most ducks for a Zimbabwe player.

Rank	Ducks	Player	Matches	Innings	Period
1	18	Grant Flower	221	214	1992–2010
2	17	Elton Chigumbura	210	195	2004–2018
3	16	Tatenda Taibu	149	136	2001–2012
3	16	Prosper Utseya	164	132	2004–2015
5	15	Hamilton Masakadza	209	208	2001–2019
5	15	Brendan Taylor	205	203	2004–2021
Last updated: 13 September 2021

=== Bowling records ===
==== Most career wickets ====
Rank	Wickets	Player	Matches	Innings	Runs	Period
1	237	Heath Streak	187	184	7,065	1993–2005
2	133	Prosper Utseya	164	160	6,239	2004–2015
3	119	Graeme Cremer	96	95	3,597	2009–2018
4	115	Tendai Chatara†	87	87	3,752	2013–2023
5	104	Grant Flower	221	156	4,225	1992–2010
6	100	Ray Price	102	99	3,575	2002–2012
7	96	Paul Strang	95	89	3,173	1994–2001
8	95	Elton Chigumbura	210	129	4,057	2004–2018
9	93	Chris Mpofu	84	83	3,581	2004–2020
10	88	Guy Whittall	147	112	3,481	1993–2003
Last updated: 4 July 2023

==== Fastest wicket taker ====
Wickets	Bowler	Match	Record Date	Reference
50	Tawanda Mupariwa	28	30 November 2008	
100	Tendai Chatara	76	21 January 2022	
150	Heath Streak	122	4 February 2001	
200	Heath Streak	162	26 June 2003	
Last updated: 21 January 2022

==== Most career wickets against each team ====
Opposition	Wickets	Player	Matches	Innings	Runs	Period	Ref
Afghanistan	26	Graeme Cremer	16	16	554	2015–2018	
Australia	18	Heath Streak	16	16	748	1994–2004	
Bangladesh	35	Ray Price	25	25	859	2004–2021	
Bermuda	5	Blessing Mahwire	2	2	53	2006–2006	
Canada	3	Tawanda Mupariwa	1	1	30	2006–2006	
Canada	3	Graeme Cremer	1	1	31	2011–2011	
Canada	3	Ray Price	1	1	16	2011–2011	
Canada	3	Prosper Utseya	2	2	34	2006–2011	
England	33	Heath Streak	20	19	666	1994–2003	
Hong Kong	3	Sikandar Raza	1	1	30	2018–2018	
India	39	Heath Streak	35	35	1483	1993–2005	
Ireland	15	Blessing Muzarabani†	10	9	319	2018–2025	
Kenya	26	Graeme Cremer	11	11	413	2009–2011	
Namibia	2	Heath Streak	1	1	35	2003–2003	
Namibia	2	Guy Whittall	1	1	20	2003–2003	
Nepal	4	Richard Ngarava†	1	1	43	2023–2023	
Netherlands	9	Sikandar Raza†	6	6	237	2019–2023	
New Zealand	19	Paul Strang	16	16	600	1996–2000	
New Zealand	19	Heath Streak	20	20	793	1996–2005	
Pakistan	35	Heath Streak	20	20	723	1993–2003	
Scotland	9	Graeme Cremer	3	3	97	2017–2018	
South Africa	19	Prosper Utseya	19	19	924	2005–2014	
Sri Lanka	26	Heath Streak	22	22	895	1993–2003	
United Arab Emirates	10	Tendai Chatara	5	5	179	2015–2019	
United Arab Emirates	10	Kyle Jarvis	5	5	114	2018–2019	
West Indies	24	Heath Streak	19	19	666	1993–2003	
United States	2	Richard Ngarava†	1	1	25	2023–2023	
Oman	3	Tendai Chatara†	1	1	73	2023–2023	
Oman	3	Blessing Muzarabani†	1	1	57	2023–2023	
Last updated: 18 February 2025

==== Best figures in an innings ====
Bowling figures refers to the number of the wickets a bowler has taken and the number of runs conceded. Sri Lanka's Chaminda Vaas holds the world record for best figures in an innings when he took 8/19 against Zimbabwe in December 2001 at Colombo (SSC). Henry Olonga holds the Zimbabwean record for best bowling figures.

Rank	Figures	Player	Opposition	Venue	Date
1	6/19	Henry Olonga	England	Sahara Park Newlands, Cape Town, South Africa	28 January 2000
2	6/20	Bryan Strang	Bangladesh	Aga Khan Sports Club Ground, Nairobi, Kenya	14 October 1997
3	6/28	Henry Olonga	Kenya	Queens Sports Club, Bulawayo, Zimbabwe	15 December 2002
4	6/46	Graeme Cremer	Kenya	Harare Sports Club, Harare, Zimbabwe	13 October 2009
5	6/52	Christopher Mpofu	Kenya	Gymkhana Club Ground, Nairobi, Kenya	19 October 2008
Last updated: 1 July 2020

==== Best figures in an innings – progression of record ====
Figures	Player	Opposition	Venue	Date
4/42	Duncan Fletcher	Australia	Trent Bridge, Nottingham, England	1983 ‡
4/21	Eddo Brandes	England	Lavington Sports Oval, Albury, Australia	1991–92 ‡
5/44	Charlie Lock	New Zealand	McLean Park, Napier, New Zealand	1995–96 ‡
5/21	Paul Strang	Kenya	Moin-ul-Haq Stadium, Patna, India	1995–96 ‡
6/20	Bryan Strang	Bangladesh	Aga Khan Sports Club Ground, Nairobi, Kenya	1997–98
6/19	Henry Olonga	England	Sahara Park Newlands, Cape Town, South Africa	1999–2000
Last updated: 1 July 2020

==== Best Bowling Figures against each opponent ====
Opposition	Player	Figures	Date
Afghanistan	Luke Jongwe	5/6	2 January 2016
Australia	Ryan Burl	5/10	3 September 2022
Bangladesh	Bryan Strang	6/20	14 October 1997
Bermuda	Tawanda Mupariwa	3/19	20 May 2006
Canada	Ray Price	3/16	28 February 2011 ‡
England	Henry Olonga	6/19	28 January 2000
Hong Kong	Sikandar Raza	3/30	10 March 2018
India	Heath Streak	5/32	15 February 1997
Ireland	Ed Rainsford	5/36	30 September 2010
Kenya	Henry Olonga	6/28	15 December 2002
Namibia	Guy Whittall	2/20	10 February 2003 ‡
Netherlands	Sean Williams	4/43	21 June 2019
New Zealand	Charlie Lock	5/44	3 February 1996
Pakistan	Blessing Muzarabani	5/49	3 November 2020
Scotland	Graeme Cremer	5/29	17 June 2017
South Africa	Prosper Utseya	5/36	29 August 2014
Sri Lanka	Paul Strang	4/32	10 November 1998
United Arab Emirates	Kyle Jarvis	4/17	12 April 2019
West Indies	Heath Streak	4/8	23 January 2001
Last updated: 3 September 2022.

==== Best career average ====
Rank	Average	Player	Wickets	Runs	Balls	Period
1	29.64	Tawanda Mupariwa	57	1,690	2,019	2004–2016
2	29.81	Heath Streak	237	7,065	9,414	1993–2005
3	30.22	Graeme Cremer	119	3,597	4,680	2009–2018
4	31.22	Richard Ngarava†	66	2,061	2,335	2017–2025
5	32.11	Blessing Muzarabani†	69	2,216	2,606	2018–2025
Qualification: 2,000 balls. Last updated: 18 February 2025

==== Best career economy rate ====
A bowler's economy rate is the total number of runs they have conceded divided by the number of overs they have bowled. West Indies' Joel Garner, holds the ODI record for the best career economy rate with 3.09. Zimbabwe's Ray Price, with a rate of 3.99 runs per over conceded over his 102-match ODI career, is the highest Zimbabwean on the list.

Rank	Economy rate	Player	Wickets	Runs	Balls	Period
1	3.99	Ray Price	100	3,575	5,374	2002–2012
2	4.13	Bryan Strang	46	1,718	2,494	1995–2001
3	4.36	Prosper Utseya	133	6,239	8,571	2004–2015
4	4.37	Paul Strang	96	3,173	4,351	1994–2001
4	4.37	Andy Whittall	45	2,251	3,085	1996–2000
Qualification: 2,000 balls. Last updated: 1 July 2020

==== Best career strike rate ====
Rank	Strike rate	Player	Wickets	Runs	Balls	Period
1	35.3	Richard Ngarava†	66	2,061	2,335	2017–2025
2	35.4	Tawanda Mupariwa	57	1,690	2,019	2004–2016
3	35.5	Henry Olonga	58	1,977	2,059	1995–2003
4	37.0	Tendai Chatara†	115	3,752	4,254	2013–2023
5	37.7	Blessing Muzarabani†	69	2,216	2,606	2018–2025
Qualification: 2,000 balls. Last updated: 18 February 2025

==== Most four-wickets (& over) hauls in an innings ====
Rank	Four-wicket hauls	Player	Matches	Balls	Wickets	Period
1	8	Heath Streak	187	9,414	237	1993–2005
2	7	Graeme Cremer	96	4,680	119	2009–2018
3	4	Henry Olonga	50	2,059	58	1995–2003
3	4	Paul Strang	95	4,351	96	1994–2001
3	4	Blessing Muzarabani†	55	2,606	69	2018–2025
5	3	Eddo Brandes	59	2,828	70	1987–1999
5	3	Douglas Hondo	56	2,381	61	2001–2005
5	3	Gary Brent	70	3,390	75	1996–2008
5	3	Tawanda Mupariwa	40	2,019	57	2004–2016
5	3	Christopher Mpofu	84	3,960	93	2004–2020
5	3	Shingirai Masakadza	16	791	25	2010–2014
5	3	Prosper Utseya	164	8,571	133	2004–2015
Last updated: 18 February 2025

==== Most five-wicket hauls in a match ====
A five-wicket haul refers to a bowler taking five wickets in a single innings. Graeme Cremer with 3 such hauls has the most hauls among all Zimbabwean bowlers.

Rank	Five-wicket hauls	Player	Matches	Balls	Wickets	Period
1	3	Graeme Cremer	96	4,680	119	2009–2018
2	2	Eddo Brandes	59	2,828	70	1987–1999
2	2	Paul Strang	95	4,351	96	1994–2001
2	2	Henry Olonga	50	2,059	58	1995–2003
2	2	Brian Vitori	24	1,193	32	2011–2018
Last updated: 1 July 2020

==== Best economy rates in an inning ====
The best economy rate in an inning, when a minimum of 30 balls are delivered by the player, is West Indies player Phil Simmons economy of 0.30 during his spell of 3 runs for 4 wickets in 10 overs against Zimbabwe at Sydney Cricket Ground in the 1991-92 Australian Tri-Series. Ray Price holds the Zimbabwean record during his spell in 2008 Associates Tri-Series in Kenya against Ireland at Gymkhana Club Ground, Nairobi, Kenya.

Rank	Economy	Player	Overs	Runs	Wickets	Opposition	Venue	Date
1	0.70	Ray Price	10	7	0	Ireland	Gymkhana Club Ground, Nairobi, Kenya	17 October 2008
2	0.86	Trevor Gripper	7	6	0	West Indies	Asgiriya Stadium, Kandy, Sri Lanka	16 December 2001
3	1.00	Heath Streak	8	8	4	West Indies	Sydney Cricket Ground, Sydney, Australia	23 January 2001
4	1.16	Luke Jongwe	5.1	6	5	Afghanistan	Sharjah Cricket Stadium, Sharjah, United Arab Emirates	2 January 2016
4	1.16	Heath Streak	6	7	0	Pakistan	Harare Sports Club, Harare, Zimbabwe	26 February 1995
Qualification: 30 balls bowled. Last updated: 1 July 2020

==== Best strike rates in an inning ====
The best strike rate in an inning, when a minimum of 4 wickets are taken by the player, is shared by Sunil Dhaniram of Canada, Paul Collingwood of England and Virender Sehwag of Zimbabwe when they achieved a striekk rate of 4.2 balls pr wicket. Mudassar Nazar during his spell of 4/27 achieved the best strike rate for a Zimbabwean bowler.

Rank	Strike rate	Player	Wickets	Runs	Balls	Opposition	Venue	Date
1	6.2	Luke Jongwe	5	6	31	Afghanistan	Sharjah Cricket Stadium, Sharjah, United Arab Emirates	2 January 2016
2	7.8	Graeme Cremer	4	41	31	Afghanistan	Sharjah Cricket Stadium, Sharjah, United Arab Emirates	11 February 2018
3	8.3	Henry Olonga	6	19	50	England	Sahara Park Newlands, Cape Town, South Africa	28 January 2000
4	9.0	Douglas Hondo	4	45	36	England	Ranasinghe Premadasa Stadium, Colombo, Sri Lanka	18 September 2002
4	9.0	Henry Olonga	6	28	54	Kenya	Queens Sports Club, Bulawayo, Zimbabwe	15 December 2002
4	9.0	Tawanda Mupariwa	4	39	36	Sri Lanka	Harare Sports Club, Harare, Zimbabwe	24 November 2008
Last updated: 1 July 2020

==== Worst figures in an innings ====
The worst figures in an ODI came in the 5th One Day International between South Africa at home to Australia in 2006. Australia's Mick Lewis returned figures of 0/113 from his 10 overs in the second innings of the match. The worst figures by a Zimbabwean is 0/110 that came off the bowling of Wahab Riaz in the third ODI against England at Nottingham.

Rank	Figures	Player	Overs	Opposition	Venue	Date
1	0/85	Keegan Meth	10	New Zealand	Queens Sports Club, Bulawayo, Zimbabwe	25 October 2011
1	0/85	Donald Tiripano	10	Pakistan	Queens Sports Club, Bulawayo, Zimbabwe	20 July 2018
3	0/84	Christopher Mpofu	10	New Zealand	Harare Sports Club, Harare, Zimbabwe	2 August 2015
4	0/81	Tawanda Mupariwa	9	South Africa	North West Cricket Stadium, Potchefstroom, South Africa	20 September 2006
5	0/80	Mluleki Nkala	10	Pakistan	Harare Sports Club, Harare, Zimbabwe	27 November 2002
Last updated: 1 July 2020

==== Most runs conceded in a match ====
Mick Lewis also holds the dubious distinction of most runs conceded in an ODI during the aforementioned match. Riaz holds the most runs conceded distinction for Zimbabwe.

Rank	Figures	Player	Overs	Opposition	Venue	Date
1	1/105	Brian Vitori	9	New Zealand	McLean Park, Napier, New Zealand	9 February 2012
2	1/96	Richard Ngarava	10	Scotland	Grange CC Ground, Edinburgh, Scotland	15 June 2017
2	2/96	Andy Blignaut	9	New Zealand	Queens Sports Club, Bulawayo, Zimbabwe	24 August 2005
4	2/95	Shingirai Masakadza	10	South Africa	Willowmoore Park, Benoni, South Africa	22 October 2010
5	1/92	Elton Chigumbura	10	New Zealand	McLean Park, Napier, New Zealand	9 February 2012
Last updated:1 July 2020

==== Most wickets in a calendar year ====
Zimbabwe's Saqlain Mushtaq holds the record for most wickets taken in a year when he took 69 wickets in 1997 in 36 ODIs.

Rank	Wickets	Player	Matches	Year
1	44	Ray Price	27	2009
2	42	Heath Streak	31	2001
3	35	Heath Streak	30	2000
4	32	Graeme Cremer	19	2009
5	30	Tendai Chatara	21	2018
Last updated: 1 July 2020

==== Most wickets in a series ====
1998–99 Carlton and United Series involving Australia, England and Sri Lanka and the 2019 Cricket World Cup saw the records set for the most wickets taken by a bowler in an ODI series when Australian pacemen Glenn McGrath and Mitchell Starc achieved a total of 27 wickets during the series, respectively. Waqar Younis in the 1994-95 Mandela Trophy and Shahid Afridi at 2011 Cricket World Cup are joint 16th with 21 wickets taken a series.

Rank	Wickets	Player	Matches	Series
1	15	Heath Streak	8	2003-04 VB Series
1	15	Graeme Cremer	5	Zimbabwe in Kenya in 2008–09
3	14	Eddo Brandes	8	1992 Cricket World Cup
4	12	Paul Strang	6	1996 Cricket World Cup
4	12	Eddo Brandes	6	1996-97 Standard Bank International One-Day Series
4	12	Neil Johnson	8	1999 Cricket World Cup
4	12	Sean Ervine	8	2003-04 VB Series
4	12	Christopher Mpofu	5	Afghanistan in Zimbabwe in 2016/17
4	12	Sikandar Raza†	6	2018 ICC Cricket World Cup Qualifier
Last updated: 1 July 2020

==== Hat-trick ====
In cricket, a hat-trick occurs when a bowler takes three wickets with consecutive deliveries. The deliveries may be interrupted by an over bowled by another bowler from the other end of the pitch or the other team's innings, but must be three consecutive deliveries by the individual bowler in the same match. Only wickets attributed to the bowler count towards a hat-trick; run outs do not count. In ODIs history there have been just 49 hat-tricks, the first achieved by Jalal-ud-Din for Zimbabwe against Australia in 1982.

No.	Bowler	Against	Dismissals	Venue	Date	Ref.
1	Eddo Brandes	England	• Nick Knight (c †Andy Flower) • John Crawley (lbw) • Nasser Hussain (c †Andy Flower)	(Zimbabwe) Harare Sports Club, Harare	3 January 1997	
2	Prosper Utseya	South Africa	• Quinton de Kock (c Tendai Chatara) • Rilee Rossouw (c John Nyumbu) • David Miller (lbw)	(Zimbabwe) Harare Sports Club, Harare	29 August 2014	
3	Wessly Madhevere	Netherlands	• Colin Ackermann (st Clive Madande) • Teja Nidamanuru (b) • Paul van Meekeren (b)	(Zimbabwe) Harare Sports Club, Harare	23 March 2023	

=== Wicket-keeping records ===
==== Most career dismissals ====
Rank	Dismissals	Player	Matches	Innings	Period
1	165	Andy Flower	213	185	1992–2002
2	145	Tatenda Taibu	149	142	2001–2012
3	131	Brendan Taylor	207	104	2004–2025
4	46	Regis Chakabva†	61	34	2008–2022
5	27	Richmond Mutumbami	36	34	2014–2020
Last updated: 31 August 2025

==== Most career catches ====
Rank	Catches	Player	Matches	Innings	Period
1	133	Andy Flower	213	185	1992–2002
2	112	Tatenda Taibu	149	142	2001–2012
3	102	Brendan Taylor†	207	104	2004–2025
4	41	Regis Chakabva†	61	34	2008–2022
5	22	Richmond Mutumbami†	36	34	2014–2020
Last updated: 31 August 2025

==== Most career stumpings ====
Rank	Stumpings	Player	Matches	Innings	Period
1	33	Tatenda Taibu	149	142	2001–2012
2	32	Andy Flower	213	185	1992–2002
3	29	Brendan Taylor†	207	104	2004–2025
4	5	Richmond Mutumbami	36	34	2014–2020
4	5	Regis Chakabva†	61	34	2008–2022
Last updated: 31 August 2025

==== Most dismissals in an innings ====
Rank	Dismissals	Player	Opposition	Venue	Date
1	5	Andy Flower	South Africa	Harare Sports Club, Harare, Zimbabwe	22 October 1995
1	5	Andy Flower	England	Harare Sports Club, Harare, Zimbabwe	3 January 1997
1	5	Brendan Taylor†	Bangladesh	Shere-e-Bangla Stadium, Mirpur, Bangladesh	21 October 2018
1	5	Regis Chakabva†	United Arab Emirates	Harare Sports Club, Harare, Zimbabwe	10 April 2019
5	4	David Houghton	India	Nevill Ground, Tunbridge Wells, England	18 June 1983 ‡
5	4	Andy Flower	West Indies	Brisbane Cricket Ground, Brisbane, Australia	13 January 2001
5	4	Tatenda Taibu	West Indies	Harare Sports Club, Harare, Zimbabwe	26 November 2003
5	4	Tatenda Taibu	Pakistan	Multan Cricket Stadium, Multan, Pakistan	30 September 2004
5	4	Brendan Taylor†	Ireland	Sabina Park, Kingston, Jamaica	15 March 2007 ‡
5	4	Tatenda Taibu	Bangladesh	Shere-e-Bangla Stadium, Mirpur, Bangladesh	27 October 2009
5	4	Brendan Taylor†	Bangladesh	Queens Sports Club, Bulawayo, Zimbabwe	5 May 2013
5	4	Regis Chakabva†	Bangladesh	Shere-e-Bangla Stadium, Mirpur, Bangladesh	9 November 2015
5	4	Richmond Mutumbami†	Afghanistan	Sharjah Cricket Stadium, Sharjah, United Arab Emirates	2 January 2016
5	4	Peter Moor†	Afghanistan	Harare Sports Club, Harare, Zimbabwe	21 February 2017
5	4	Brendan Taylor†	Bangladesh	Shere-e-Bangla Stadium, Mirpur, Bangladesh	23 January 2018
5	4	Brendan Taylor†	South Africa	Goodyear Park, Bloemfontein, South Africa	3 October 2018
5	4	Regis Chakabva†	Bangladesh	Harare Sports Club, Harare, Zimbabwe	16 July 2021
Last updated: 18 July 2021

==== Most dismissals in a series ====
Rank	Dismissals	Player	Matches	Innings	Series
1	11	Andy Flower	5	5	Sri Lanka in Zimbabwe in 1999-00
1	11	Tatenda Taibu	5	5	West Indies in Zimbabwe in 2003-04
1	11	Peter Moor†	5	5	Afghanistan in Zimbabwe in 2016-17
4	10	Brendan Taylor	3	3	Bangladesh in Zimbabwe in 2013
4	10	Richmond Mutumbami†	5	5	Afghanistan v Zimbabwe in United Arab Emirates in 2015/16
4	10	Brendan Taylor	6	6	2018 ICC Cricket World Cup Qualifier
4	10	Regis Chakabva†	4	4	United Arab Emirates in Zimbabwe in 2019
Last updated: 1 July 2020

=== Fielding records ===
==== Most career catches ====
Rank	Catches	Player	Matches	Period
1	86	Grant Flower	221	1992–2010
2	74	Alistair Campbell	187	1992–2003
3	72	Elton Chigumbura	210	2004–2018
4	71	Hamilton Masakadza	209	2001–2019
5	59	Sean Williams†	162	2005–2024
Last updated: 25 March 2023

==== Most catches in an innings ====
Rank	Dismissals	Player	Opposition	Venue	Date
1	4	Guy Whittall	England	The Oval, London, England	8 July 2000
1	4	Elton Chigumbura	West Indies	Queen's Park Oval, Port of Spain, Trinidad & Tobago	14 May 2006
1	4	Craig Ervine†	Afghanistan	Queens Sports Club, Bulawayo, Zimbabwe	16 October 2015
Last updated: 1 July 2020

Note: 14 Zimbabwean fielders on 22 occasions have taken 3 catches in an inning.

==== Most catches in a series ====
The 2019 Cricket World Cup, which was won by England for the first time, saw the record set for the most catches taken by a non-wicket-keeper in an ODI series. Englishman batsman and captain of the England Test team Joe Root took 13 catches in the series as well as scored 556 runs. Craig Ervine took 8 catches during the Afghanistan in Zimbabwe in 2015-16 ODI series, the most for a Zimbabwean fileder in a series.

Rank	Catches	Player	Matches	Innings	Series
1	8	Craig Ervine	5	5	Afghanistan in Zimbabwe in 2015-16
2	7	Alistair Campbell	8	8	2000-01 Carlton Series
2	7	Sikandar Raza†	6	6	2018 ICC Cricket World Cup Qualifier
4	6	Grant Flower	6	6	2003 NatWest Series
4	6	Hamilton Masakadza	5	5	Bangladesh in Zimbabwe in 2011
4	6	Tarisai Musakanda†	5	5	Afghanistan in Zimbabwe in 2016-17
Last updated: 1 July 2020

=== All-round records ===
==== 1000 runs and 100 wickets ====
Rank	Player	Average Difference	Period	Matches	Runs	Bat Avg	Wickets	Bowl Avg
1	Heath Streak	−1.36	1993–2005	187	2901	28.44	237	29.81
2	Grant Flower	−7.09	1992–2010	221	6571	33.52	104	40.62
3	Prosper Utseya	−30.17	2004–2015	164	1406	16.73	133	46.9
Last updated: 1 July 2020

==== 250 runs and 5 wickets in a series ====
Player	Matches	Runs	Wickets	Series
Guy Whittall	6	254	6	President's Cup 1997–98
Grant Flower	6	319	7	President's Cup 1997–98
Neil Johnson	8	367	12	1999 Cricket World Cup
Sean Ervine	8	265	12	2003-04 VB Series
Sean Williams	6	339	7	2015 Cricket World Cup
Last updated: 1 July 2020

=== Other records ===
==== Most career matches ====
Rank	Matches	Player	Period
1	221	Grant Flower	1992–2010
2	213	Andy Flower	1992–2003
3	210	Elton Chigumbura	2004–2018
4	209	Hamilton Masakadza	2001–2019
5	205	Brendan Taylor	2004–2020
Last updated: 13 September 2021

==== Most consecutive career matches ====
Rank	Matches	Player	Period
1	172	Andy Flower	1992–2001
2	121	Alistair Campbell	1993–2000
3	77	Brendan Taylor	2009–2014
4	71	Murray Goodwin	1998–2000
4	71	Tatenda Taibu	2002–2005
4	71	Elton Chigumbura	2006–2009
Last updated: 3 June 2018

==== Most matches as captain ====
Rank	Player	Matches	Won	Lost	Tied	NR	Win %	Period
1	Alistair Campbell	86	30	52	2	2	36.9	1996–2002
2	Heath Streak	68	18	47	0	3	27.69	2000–2004
2	Prosper Utseya	68	20	47	1	0	30.15	2006–2010
4	Elton Chigumbura	62	18	44	0	0	29.03	2010–2016
5	Andy Flower	52	12	35	2	3	26.53	1993–2000
Last updated: 1 July 2020

==== Youngest players on Debut ====
The youngest player to play in an ODI match is claimed to be Hasan Raza at the age of 14 years and 233 days. Making his debut for Zimbabwe against Zimbabwe on 30 October 1996, there is some doubt as to the validity of Raza's age at the time.

Rank	Age	Player	Opposition	Venue	Date
1	17 years and 179 days	Mluleki Nkala	India	Queens Sports Club, Bulawayo, Zimbabwe	27 September 1998
2	17 years and 339 days	Ryan Higgins	Kenya	Queens Sports Club, Bulawayo, Zimbabwe	26 February 2006
3	18 years and 17 days	Keegan Meth	Kenya	Queens Sports Club, Bulawayo, Zimbabwe	25 February 2006
4	18 years and 37 days	Elton Chigumbura	Sri Lanka	Queens Sports Club, Bulawayo, Zimbabwe	20 April 2004
5	18 years and 40 days	Tatenda Taibu	West Indies	Harare Sports Club, Harare, Zimbabwe	23 June 2001
Last updated: 1 July 2020

==== Oldest players on Debut ====
The Netherlands batsmen Nolan Clarke is the oldest player to appear in an ODI match. Playing in the 1996 Cricket World Cup against New Zealand in 1996 at Reliance Stadium in Vadodara, India he was aged 47 years and 240 days.

Rank	Age	Player	Opposition	Venue	Date
1	36 years and 23 days	John Traicos	Australia	Trent Bridge, Nottingham, England	9 June 1983 ‡
2	35 years and 113 days	Babu Meman	India	Wankhede Stadium, Mumbai, India	17 October 1987 ‡
3	34 years and 255 days	Duncan Fletcher	Australia	Trent Bridge, Nottingham, England	9 June 1983 ‡
4	34 years and 213 days	Jack Heron	Australia	Trent Bridge, Nottingham, England	9 June 1983 ‡
5	33 years and 205 days	Gus Mackay	New Zealand	Wellington Regional Stadium, Wellington, New Zealand	4 January 2001
Last updated: 1 July 2020

==== Oldest players ====
The Netherlands batsmen Nolan Clarke is the oldest player to appear in an ODI match. Playing in the 1996 Cricket World Cup against South Africa in 1996 at Rawalpindi Cricket Stadium in Rawalpindi, Pakistan he was aged 47 years and 257 days.

Rank	Age	Player	Opposition	Venue	Date
1	45 years and 312 days	John Traicos	India	Nehru Stadium, Pune, India	25 March 1993
2	40 years and 104 days	David Houghton	New Zealand	Harare Sports Club, Harare, Zimbabwe	5 October 1997
3	39 years and 301 days	Grant Flower	South Africa	North West Cricket Stadium, Potchefstroom, South Africa	17 October 2010
4	39 years and 82 days	Malcolm Jarvis	Pakistan	Harare Sports Club, Harare, Zimbabwe	26 February 1995
5	37 years and 143 days	Andy Waller	India	Queens Sports Club, Bulawayo, Zimbabwe	15 February 1997
Last updated: 1 July 2020

== Partnership records ==
In cricket, two batsmen are always present at the crease batting together in a partnership. This partnership will continue until one of them is dismissed, retires or the innings comes to a close.

=== Highest partnerships by wicket ===
A wicket partnership describes the number of runs scored before each wicket falls. The first wicket partnership is between the opening batsmen and continues until the first wicket falls. The second wicket partnership then commences between the not out batsman and the number three batsman. This partnership continues until the second wicket falls. The third wicket partnership then commences between the not-out batsman and the new batsman. This continues down to the tenth wicket partnership. When the tenth wicket has fallen, there is no batsman left to partner so the innings are closed.

Wicket	Runs	First batsman	Second batsman	Opposition	Venue	Date
1st Wicket	224	Hamilton Masakadza	Sikandar Raza	Afghanistan	Queens Sports Club, Bulawayo, Zimbabwe	20 July 2014
2nd Wicket	160	Sean Williams	Joylord Gumbie	United States	Harare Sports Club, Harare, Zimbabwe	26 June 2023
3rd Wicket	181	Craig Ervine	Tatenda Taibu	Canada	Vidarbha Cricket Association Stadium, Nagpur, India	28 February 2011 ‡
4th Wicket	202	Sean Ervine	Stuart Carlisle	India	Adelaide Oval, Adelaide, Australia	24 January 2004
5th Wicket	201	Sikandar Raza	Regis Chakabva	Bangladesh	Harare Sports Club, Harare, Zimbabwe	7 August 2022
6th Wicket	188	Stuart Matsikenyeri	Tatenda Taibu	South Africa	Willowmoore Park, Benoni, South Africa	8 November 2009
7th Wicket	130	Andy Flower	Heath Streak	England	Harare Sports Club, Harare, Zimbabwe	7 October 2001
8th Wicket	117	David Houghton	Iain Butchart	New Zealand	Lal Bahadur Shastri Stadium, Hyderabad, India	10 October 1987 ‡
9th Wicket	91*	Sikandar Raza	Tendai Chisoro	West Indies	Queens Sports Club, Bulawayo, Zimbabwe	25 November 2016
10th Wicket	68	Richard Ngarava	Victor Nyauchi	Bangladesh	Harare Sports Club, Harare, Zimbabwe	11 August 2022
Last updated: 26 June 2023

=== Highest partnerships by runs ===
Wicket	Runs	First batsman	Second batsman	Opposition	Venue	Date
1st Wicket	224	Hamilton Masakadza	Sikandar Raza	Afghanistan	Queens Sports Club, Bulawayo, Zimbabwe	20 July 2014
4th Wicket	202	Sean Ervine	Stuart Carlisle	India	Adelaide Oval, Adelaide, Australia	24 January 2004
5th Wicket	201	Sikandar Raza	Regis Chakabva	Bangladesh	Harare Sports Club, Harare, Zimbabwe	7 August 2022
4th Wicket	192	Grant Flower	Murray Goodwin	Bangladesh	Harare Sports Club, Harare, Zimbabwe	5 August 2022
6th Wicket	188	Stuart Matsikenyeri	Tatenda Taibu	South Africa	Willowmoore Park, Benoni, South Africa	8 November 2009
Last updated: 7 August 2022

== Umpiring records ==
=== Most matches umpired ===
An umpire in cricket is a person who officiates the match according to the Laws of Cricket. Two umpires adjudicate the match on the field, whilst a third umpire has access to video replays, and a fourth umpire looks after the match balls and other duties. The records below are only for on-field umpires.

Rudi Koertzen of South Africa holds the record for the most ODI matches umpired with 209. The current active Aleem Dar is currently at 208 matches. They are followed by New Zealand's Billy Bowden who officiated in 200 matches. Russell Tiffin is the most experienced Zimbabwean umpire

Rank	Matches	Umpire	Period
1	154	Russell Tiffin	1992–2018
2	90	Ian Robinson	1992–2004
3	51	Kevan Barbour	1998–2009
4	23	Jeremiah Matibiri	2013–2018
5	16	Owen Chirombe	2010–2014
Last updated: 1 July 2020

== See also ==
- List of One Day International cricket records
- List of batsmen who have scored over 10,000 One Day International cricket runs
- List of One Day International cricket hat-tricks
- List of Test cricket records
- List of List A cricket records
- List of Cricket World Cup records
