= Australian cricket team in Zimbabwe in 2004 =

	Zimbabwe	Australia
- Dates: 25 May – 4 June 2004
Captains	Tatenda Taibu	Ricky Ponting

One Day International series
- Results: Australia won the 5-match series 5–0
Most runs	Brendan Taylor (195)	Michael Clarke (318)
Most wickets	Tawanda Mupariwa (8)	Jason Gillespie (14)
- Player of the series: Jason Gillespie (AUS)

The Australia national cricket team toured Zimbabwe in May 2004 to play a series of five One Day International (ODI) matches against Zimbabwe in Harare and Bulawayo.

Originally scheduled as a two-Test series to be held in April 2002. It was canceled by the Australian Cricket Board due to security reports received by them. Later, it was converted into an ODI series when ICC shutdown Test series due to Zimbabwe Board governance issues.

== ODI series ==
=== 1st ODI ===
25 May
Scorecard

Zimbabwe; 205/9 (50 overs)	v	Australia; 207/3 (39.4 overs)
Brendan Taylor 59 (101); Jason Gillespie 2/21 (10 overs)		Ricky Ponting 91 (93); Tinashe Panyangara 2/48 (9.4 overs)

Australia won by 7 wickets
Harare Sports Club, Harare
Umpires: Kevan Barbour (Zim) and Steve Bucknor (WI)
Player of the match: Ricky Ponting (Aus)

- Zimbabwe won the toss and elected to bat.

=== 2nd ODI ===
27 May
Scorecard

Australia; 323/8 (50 overs)	v	Zimbabwe; 184 (44.3 overs)
Matthew Hayden 87 (101); Stuart Matsikenyeri 2/43 (10 overs)		Brendan Taylor 65 (93); Darren Lehmann 4/7 (4.3 overs)

Australia won by 139 runs
Harare Sports Club, Harare
Umpires: Steve Bucknor (WI) and Ian Robinson (Zim)
Player of the match: Darren Lehmann (Aus)

- Zimbabwe won the toss and elected to field.

=== 3rd ODI ===
29 May
Scorecard

Zimbabwe; 196 (48.5 overs)	v	Australia; 199/2 (30.4 overs)
Elton Chigumbura 77 (90); Jason Gillespie 5/32 (10 overs)		Michael Clarke 105* (102); Tawanda Mupariwa 2/48 (8 overs)

Australia won by 8 wickets
Harare Sports Club, Harare
Umpires: Steve Bucknor (WI) and Ian Robinson (Zim)
Player of the match: Jason Gillespie (Aus)

- Australia won the toss and elected to field.
- Michael Clarke (Aus) scored his first century in ODIs.

=== 4th ODI ===
1 June
Scorecard

Zimbabwe; 246 (48.5 overs)	v	Australia; 249/2 (39.4 overs)
Elton Chigumbura 77 (90); Jason Gillespie 5/32 (10 overs)		Michael Clarke 125* (102); Tawanda Mupariwa 2/48 (8 overs)

Australia won by 8 wickets
Harare Sports Club, Harare
Umpires: Steve Bucknor (WI) and Ian Robinson (Zim)
Player of the match: Jason Gillespie (Aus)

- Australia won the toss and elected to field.
- Michael Clarke (Aus) scored his first century in ODIs.

=== 5th ODI ===
4 June
Scorecard

Zimbabwe; 126 (38.5 overs)	v	Australia; 129/2 (20.4 overs)
Elton Chigumbura 37 (60); Jason Gillespie 5/22 (10 overs)		Michael Clarke 75* (92); Tawanda Mupariwa 2/28 (5 overs)

Australia won by 8 wickets
Queens Sports Club, Bulawayo
Umpires: Steve Bucknor (WI) and Ian Robinson (Zim)
Player of the match: Jason Gillespie (Aus)

- Australia won the toss and elected to field.
- Michael Clarke (Aus) scored his first century in ODIs.
