= Sri Lankan cricket team in Zimbabwe in 2004 =

International cricket tour

Sri Lankans in Zimbabwe 2004
	Zimbabwe	Sri Lanka
- Dates: 20 April 2004 – 17 May 2004
Captains	Tatenda Taibu	Marvan Atapattu; Mahela Jayawardene (4th ODI)

Test series
- Result: Sri Lanka won the 2-match series 2–0
Most runs	Dion Ebrahim (115)	Marvan Atapattu (419)
Most wickets	Tinashe Panyangara (4)	Muttiah Muralitharan (14)
- Player of the series: Marvan Atapattu (Sri Lanka)

One Day International series
- Results: Sri Lanka won the 5-match series 5–0
Most runs	Tatenda Taibu (169)	Kumar Sangakkara (136)
Most wickets	Tawanda Mupariwa (4)	Muttiah Muralitharan (10)
- Player of the series: Tatenda Taibu (Zimbabwe)

The Sri Lanka national cricket team toured Zimbabwe in April and May 2004 to play 2 Test matches and 5 Limited Overs Internationals. The next time Zimbabwe played Sri Lanka in a Test match was in October 2016.

The series was preceded by a massive crisis rocking Zimbabwe cricket, with captain Heath Streak sacked and dropped from the team for criticising the Zimbabwe Cricket Union (ZCU) and several of its policies, including the quota system for non-white cricketers and politicisation of the sport among others. Subsequently, thirteen leading Zimbabwean cricketers, all of them white, rebelled and made themselves unavailable for selection in protest against the treatment meted out to Streak by the ZCU. As a result, a second-string side led by wicketkeeper Tatenda Taibu and comprising mostly black cricketers was selected to face Sri Lanka. The side proved to be clearly uncompetitive as the Lankans whitewashed them in both the ODIs and Tests by margins of 5-0 and 2-0 respectively, winning all matches by heavy margins and winning both Tests by an innings.

Due to the shambolic performance by the Zimbabweans, the ZCU scrapped all Test matches involving Zimbabwe for the rest of the year. The series marked the start of the downfall for Zimbabwe cricket which continues to this day.

== Squads ==
Zimbabwe	Sri Lanka
Tatenda Taibu (c; wk)	Marvan Atapattu (c)
Dion Ebrahim	Prasanna Jayawardene (wk)
Elton Chigumbura	Mahela Jayawardene
Douglas Hondo	Kumar Sangakkara
Blessing Mahwire	Sanath Jayasuriya
Alester Maregwede	Tillakaratne Dilshan
Stuart Matsikenyeri	Thilan Samaraweera
Tawanda Mupariwa	Dinusha Fernando
Mluleki Nkala	Chaminda Vaas
Tinashe Panyangara	Muttiah Muralitharan
Brendan Taylor	Upul Chandana
Prosper Utseya	Ian Daniel
Mark Vermeulen	Rangana Herath
	Thilina Kandamby
	Farveez Maharoof
	Nuwan Zoysa
	Russel Arnold

== ODI series ==
=== 1st ODI ===
20 April 2004
Scorecard

Zimbabwe; 211/6 (50 overs)	v	Sri Lanka; 144/4 (27 overs)
T Taibu 96* (151); DNT Zoysa 3/21 (7 overs)		KC Sangakkara 73* (72); DT Hondo 2/34 (7 overs)

Sri Lanka won by 12 runs (D/L method)
Queens Sports Club, Bulawayo
Umpires: KC Barbour (ZIM) and DJ Harper (AUS)
Player of the match: T Taibu (ZIM)

- Sri Lanka won the toss and elected to field.
- Sri Lankan innings reduced to 33 overs. Target 173.
- Sri Lankan innings further reduced to 27 overs. When play was halted Sri Lanka needed to have scored 133 runs to win.
- E Chigumbura, T Panyangara, BRM Taylor and P Utseya (all ZIM) made their ODI debuts.

=== 2nd ODI ===
22 April 2004
Scorecard

Zimbabwe; 136 (36.4 overs)	v	Sri Lanka; 139/1 (20.5 overs)
T Taibu 35 (57); M Muralitharan 4/32 (8.4 overs)		WS Jayantha 74* (64); T Panyangara 1/40 (6 overs)

Sri Lanka won by 9 wickets
Queens Sports Club, Bulawayo
Umpires: KC Barbour (ZIM) and IL Howell (SA)
Player of the match: WPUJC Vaas (Sri Lanka)

- Sri Lanka won the toss and elected to field.

=== 3rd ODI ===
25 April 2004
Scorecard

Zimbabwe; 35 (18 overs)	v	Sri Lanka; 40/1 (9.2 overs)
DD Ebrahim 7 (10); Extras 7 WPUJC Vaas 4/11 (9 overs)		WS Jayantha 28* (26); DT Hondo 1/11 (5 overs)

Sri Lanka won by 9 wickets
Harare Sports Club, Harare
Umpires: DJ Harper (AUS) and ID Robinson (ZIM)
Player of the match: WPUJC Vaas (Sri Lanka)

- Sri Lanka won the toss and elected to field.
- HMRKB Herath and MF Maharoof (both SL) made their ODI debuts.
- Chaminda Vaas took 300 wickets in ODIs.
- Zimbabwe's score of 35 was the lowest ever score in ODIs till 12 February 2020. USA scored 35 against Nepal in 12 overs and hence tied the record with Zimbabwe.

=== 4th ODI ===
27 April 2004
Scorecard

Sri Lanka; 223/9 (50 overs)	v	Zimbabwe; 151 (43.4 overs)
KC Sangakkara 63 (100); ML Nkala 3/50 (10 overs)		DD Ebrahim 50* (92); MF Maharoof 2/19 (8.4 overs)

Sri Lanka won by 72 runs
Harare Sports Club, Harare
Umpires: KC Barbour (ZIM) and IL Howell (SA)
Player of the match: UDU Chandana (SL)

- Zimbabwe won the toss and elected to field.
- SHT Kandamby (SL) and T Mupariwa (ZIM) made their ODI debuts.

=== 5th ODI ===
29 April 2004
Scorecard

Sri Lanka; 246/7 (50 overs)	v	Zimbabwe; 221/9 (50 overs)
RP Arnold 51* (51); T Taibu 2/42 (10 overs)		BRM Taylor 74 (120); M Muralitharan 5/23 (10 overs)

Sri Lanka won by 25 runs
Harare Sports Club, Harare
Umpires: DJ Harper (AUS) and ID Robinson (ZIM)
Player of the match: RP Arnold (SL)

- Sri Lanka won the toss and elected to bat.

== Test series ==
=== 1st Test ===
6–8 May
Scorecard

Zimbabwe	v	Sri Lanka
199 (71.2 overs); Tatenda Taibu 40 (108); Muttiah Muralitharan 6/45 (24.2 overs)		541 (125.1 overs); Marvan Atapattu 170 (253); Blessing Mahwire 3/97 (18 overs)
102 (32 overs); Mluleki Nkala 24 (50); Nuwan Zoysa 5/20 (9.5 overs)

Sri Lanka won by an innings and 240 runs
Harare Sports Club, Harare
Umpires: Billy Bowden (NZ) and Rudi Koertzen (SA)
Player of the match: Muttiah Muralitharan

- Sri Lanka won the toss and elected to field.
- Test debuts: Brendan Taylor, Elton Chigumbura, Prosper Utseya, Alester Maregwede, Tinashe Panyangara (all Zimbabwe), Farveez Maharoof (Sri Lanka)

=== 2nd Test ===
14–17 May
Scorecard

Zimbabwe	v	Sri Lanka
228 (75 overs); Dion Ebrahim 70 (112); Chaminda Vaas 3/41 (19 overs)		713/3d (165.3 overs); Kumar Sangakkara 270 (365); Mluleki Nkala 1/111 (32 overs)
231 (75.1 overs); Dion Ebrahim 42 (103); Muttiah Muralitharan 4/79 (28.1 overs)

Sri Lanka won by an innings and 254 runs
Queens Sports Club, Bulawayo
Umpires: Billy Bowden (NZ) and Rudi Koertzen (SA)
Player of the match: Kumar Sangakkara (Sri Lanka)

- Sri Lanka won the toss and elected to field
- Tawanda Mupariwa (Zimbabwe) made his Test debut.
