= Zimbabwean cricket team in Kenya in 2008–09 =

Zimbabwean cricket team in Kenya in 2008-09
	Kenya	Zimbabwe
- Dates: 27 January 2009 – 4 February 2009
Captains	Steve Tikolo	Prosper Utseya

One Day International series
- Results: Zimbabwe won the 5-match series 5–0
Most runs	Collins Obuya 165	Hamilton Masakadza 260
Most wickets	Steve Tikolo 5/199	Graeme Cremer 15/172

The Zimbabwean cricket team toured Kenya from 27 January to 4 February 2009. They played five One Day Internationals during the tour.

== ODI series ==
=== 1st ODI ===
27 January
Scorecard

Zimbabwe; 306/7 (50 overs)	v	Kenya; 197/10 (46.2 overs)
Elton Chigumbura 79 (38 balls); Ed Rainsford 2/19 (6 overs)		Jimmy Kamande 74 (86 balls); Steve Tikolo 2/32 (10 overs)

Zimbabwe won by 109 runs
Mombasa, Kenya
Umpires: Subhash Modi (Ken) and Tyron Wijewardene (SL)
Player of the match: Elton Chigumbura

- Graeme Cremer, Forster Mutizwa (both Zimbabwe) made their ODI debuts

=== 2nd ODI ===
29 January
Scorecard

Zimbabwe; 351/7 (50 overs)	v	Kenya; 200 (45.1 overs)
Stuart Matsikenyeri 90 (95 balls); Collins Obuya 2/57 (9 overs)		Steve Tikolo 56 (48 balls); Keith Dabengwa 2/21 (5.1 overs)

Zimbabwe won by 151 runs
Mombasa, Kenya
Umpires: Subhash Modi (Ken) and Tyron Wijewardene (SL)
Player of the match: Elton Chigumbura

=== 3rd ODI ===
31 January
Scorecard

Kenya; 234 (49.3 overs)	v	Zimbabwe; 236/6 (48.2 overs)
Collins Obuya 55 (63 balls); Graeme Cremer 4/39 (10 overs)		Prosper Utseya 68* (65 balls); Peter Ongondo 2/42 (9 overs)

Zimbabwe won by 4 wickets (with 10 balls remaining)
Nairobi, Kenya
Umpires: Subhash Modi (Ken) and Tyron Wijewardene (SL)
Player of the match: Prosper Utseya

=== 4th ODI ===
1 February
Scorecard

Zimbabwe; 285/8 (50 overs)	v	Kenya; 219 (49 overs)
Forster Mutizwa 61 (45 balls); Nehemiah Odhiambo 3/56 (8 overs)		Alex Obanda 96 (93 balls); Elton Chigumbura 4/28 (7 overs)

Zimbabwe won by 66 runs
Nairobi, Kenya
Umpires: Subhash Modi (Ken) and Tyron Wijewardene (SL)
Player of the match: Elton Chigumbura

=== 5th ODI ===
4 February
scorecard

Kenya; 199 (48.5 ov)	v	Zimbabwe; 203/3 (35 ov)
Collins Obuya 75 (108 balls); Graeme Cremer 4/31 (8.5 overs)		Hamilton Masakadza 84* (84 balls); Lameck Onyango 1/39 (5 overs)

Zimbabwe won by 7 wickets
Nairobi, Kenya
Umpires: Subhash Modi (Ken) and Tyron Wijewardene (SL)
Player of the match: Graeme Cremer
