= Zimbabwean cricket team in Pakistan in 2015 =

International cricket tour

	Pakistan	Zimbabwe
- Dates: 19 May 2015 – 31 May 2015
Captains	Shahid Afridi (T20Is); Azhar Ali (ODIs)	Elton Chigumbura (T20Is and 1st ODI); Hamilton Masakadza (2nd & 3rd ODIs)

One Day International series
- Results: Pakistan won the 3-match series 2–0
Most runs	Azhar Ali (227)	Chamu Chibhabha (138)
Most wickets	Wahab Riaz (5)	Sikandar Raza & Graeme Cremer (3)
- Player of the series: Azhar Ali (Pak)

Twenty20 International series
- Results: Pakistan won the 2-match series 2–0
Most runs	Mukhtar Ahmed (145)	Hamilton Masakadza (82)
Most wickets	Mohammad Sami (4)	Sean Williams (3)
- Player of the series: Mukhtar Ahmed (Pak)

The Zimbabwe cricket team toured Pakistan from 19 to 31 May 2015. The tour consisted of three One Day International (ODI) and two Twenty20 International (T20I) matches, all played at Gaddafi Stadium in Lahore. It was the first tour of Pakistan by a Test-playing nation since the attack on the Sri Lankan cricket team in Lahore in 2009. Pakistan won the T20I series 2–0 and won the ODI series 2–0 after the third match finished as a no result. It was Pakistan's first ODI series win in two years. Pakistan ODI captain Azhar Ali said "it's been an exciting and emotional series for many reasons. It became important for us, as many of us never played in Pakistan, and winning makes it more significant because it gives you confidence".

== Summary ==
Before the tour, several Zimbabwean cricketers expressed their concerns about travelling to Pakistan, but were committed to the trip. Pakistan captain Misbah-ul-Haq had described the tour as "a big joy for all of Pakistan cricket fans, players and for the PCB officials". Tony Irish, the executive chairman of the Federation of International Cricketers' Associations (FICA), said that "we are very concerned about the safety of players and any match officials who may be sent to Pakistan, should this tour go ahead". The International Cricket Council (ICC) announced that it was awaiting the outcome of a security report before deciding if it were to send officials, with the possibility that the Pakistan Cricket Board (PCB) would use its own officials if the ICC was unable to supply them.

Zimbabwe Cricket (ZC) were in talks with its own government regarding concerns over security. ZC caused confusion after issuing a press release on 14 May stating the tour had been suspended, but they retracted it just 15 minutes later. On 17 May ZC confirmed that the tour would go ahead. The ICC did not appoint any of its match officials, but made provision for the PCB to use their own umpires. The Zimbabwe team received state guest importance, including more than 4,000 police officers for their security when they arrived in Pakistan at Allama Iqbal International Airport on 19 May to start the tour.

Only five players in the Pakistan T20 squad had played a home international match before this tour. Batsman Umar Akmal said that "it will be an amazing feeling, it would mean so much to me. Cricketers around the world take playing at home in front of their own crowds for granted". Tickets for both of the T20 matches sold out within two days, with 60,000 people attending the first game.

In the ODI series, Zimbabwe captain Elton Chigumbura was suspended for the last two matches, due to a bowling a slow over-rate in the first match. Hamilton Masakadza became the Zimbabwean captain for the final two matches in Chigumbura's absence.

During the second ODI match, there was a loud explosion outside the stadium that was thought to have been caused by an electricity transformer. It was later revealed to be a suicide attack that killed a civilian and a Punjab Police officer, while he was trying to stop the suicide bomber. The initial report of the transformer explosion was used to avoid a panic. Despite the attack, the third and final match of the series went ahead as scheduled.

After the matches had concluded, it was revealed that the PCB had paid the players in the Zimbabwe squad US$12,500 each for the tour. This was paid in two amounts, the first when Zimbabwe arrived in Pakistan, and the second after the tour dates had been fulfilled.

== Squads ==
ODIs		T20Is	
Pakistan	Zimbabwe	Pakistan	Zimbabwe
Azhar Ali (c); Mohammad Hafeez; Ahmed Shehzad; Asad Shafiq; Haris Sohail; Shoaib Malik; Babar Azam; Mohammad Rizwan; Sarfaraz Ahmed; Anwar Ali; Hammad Azam; Imad Wasim; Yasir Shah; Wahab Riaz; Mohammad Sami; Junaid Khan	Elton Chigumbura (c); Sikandar Raza; Chamu Chibhabha; Charles Coventry; Graeme Cremer; Craig Ervine; Roy Kaia; Hamilton Masakadza; Christopher Mpofu; Tawanda Mupariwa; Richmond Mutumbami; Tinashe Panyangara; Vusi Sibanda; Prosper Utseya; Brian Vitori; Sean Williams	Shahid Afridi (c); Sarfaraz Ahmed; Ahmed Shehzad; Mohammad Hafeez; Mukhtar Ahmed; Nauman Anwar; Shoaib Malik; Umar Akmal; Mohammad Rizwan; Anwar Ali; Hammad Azam; Imad Wasim; Bilawal Bhatti; Wahab Riaz; Mohammad Sami	Elton Chigumbura (c); Sikandar Raza; Chamu Chibhabha; Charles Coventry; Graeme Cremer; Craig Ervine; Roy Kaia; Hamilton Masakadza; Christopher Mpofu; Tawanda Mupariwa; Richmond Mutumbami; Tinashe Panyangara; Vusi Sibanda; Prosper Utseya; Brian Vitori; Sean Williams

== T20I series ==
=== 1st T20I ===
22 May 2015
19:00 (D/N)
Scorecard

Zimbabwe; 172/6 (20 overs)	v	Pakistan; 173/5 (19.3 overs)
Elton Chigumbura 54 (35); Mohammed Sami 3/36 (4 overs)		Mukhtar Ahmed 83 (45); Graeme Cremer 2/28 (4 overs)

Pakistan won by 5 wickets
Gaddafi Stadium, Lahore
Umpires: Ahsan Raza (Pak) and Shozab Raza (Pak)
Player of the match: Mukhtar Ahmed (Pak)

- Zimbabwe won the toss and elected to bat.
- Richmond Mutumbami (Zim) made his T20I debut.

=== 2nd T20I ===
24 May 2015
19:00 (D/N)
Scorecard

Zimbabwe; 175/3 (20 overs)	v	Pakistan; 176/8 (19.4 overs)
Sean Williams 58* (32); Shoaib Malik 1/23 (4 overs)		Mukhtar Ahmed 62 (40); Christopher Mpofu 2/25 (4 overs)

Pakistan won by 2 wickets
Gaddafi Stadium, Lahore
Umpires: Ahsan Raza (Pak) and Ahmed Shahab (Pak)
Player of the match: Mukhtar Ahmed (Pak)

- Zimbabwe won the toss and elected to bat.
- Imad Wasim and Nauman Anwar (both Pak) made their T20I debuts.

== ODI series ==
=== 1st ODI ===
26 May 2015
16:00 (D/N)
Scorecard

Pakistan; 375/3 (50 overs)	v	Zimbabwe; 334/5 (50 overs)
Shoaib Malik 112 (76); Prosper Utseya 2/63 (10 overs)		Elton Chigumbura 117 (95); Wahab Riaz 3/47 (10 overs)

Pakistan won by 41 runs
Gaddafi Stadium, Lahore
Umpires: Aleem Dar (Pak) and Russell Tiffin (Zim)
Player of the match: Shoaib Malik (Pak)

- Pakistan won the toss and elected to bat.
- Elton Chigumbura (Zim) scored his maiden ODI century.

=== 2nd ODI ===
29 May 2015
16:00 (D/N)
Scorecard

Zimbabwe; 268/7 (50 overs)	v	Pakistan; 269/4 (47.2 overs)
Sikandar Raza 100* (84); Yasir Shah 2/40 (10 overs)		Azhar Ali 102 (104); Graeme Cremer 2/52 (10 overs)

Pakistan won by 6 wickets
Gaddafi Stadium, Lahore
Umpires: Shozab Raza (Pak) and Russell Tiffin (Zim)
Player of the match: Azhar Ali (Pak)

- Pakistan won the toss and elected to field.

=== 3rd ODI ===
31 May 2015
16:00 (D/N)
Scorecard

Pakistan; 296/9 (50 overs)	v	Zimbabwe; 68/0 (9 overs)
Mohammad Hafeez 80 (80); Sikandar Raza 3/59 (10 overs)		Chamu Chibhabha 39* (27)

No result
Gaddafi Stadium, Lahore
Umpires: Ahsan Raza (Pak) and Russell Tiffin (Zim)

- Pakistan won the toss and elected to bat.
- After the 8th over of the Zimbabwean innings there was a floodlight failure, followed by a dust storm. Four overs of play were lost before the innings were restarted. One over later, rain stopped play and the match was abandoned as a no result.
- Babar Azam (Pak) and Roy Kaia (Zim) made their ODI debuts.
