= Bangladeshi cricket team in Zimbabwe in 2009 =

International cricket tour

	Bangladesh	Zimbabwe
- Dates: August 9 – August 18, 2009
Captains	Shakib Al Hasan	Prosper Utseya

One Day International series
- Results: Bangladesh won the 5-match series 4–1
Most runs	Tamim Iqbal 300	Charles Coventry 296
Most wickets	Syed Rasel 7	Ray Price 8
- Player of the series: Tamim Iqbal

The Bangladesh cricket team toured Zimbabwe in 2009. They played five One Day Internationals against Zimbabwe. Due to Zimbabwe's self-imposed suspension from Test cricket, no Test matches were scheduled; instead, Zimbabwe have entered a team in the ICC Intercontinental Cup. At the same time as the ODI series against Bangladesh, a Zimbabwe XI will play a four-day Intercontinental Cup match against Afghanistan.

== ODI series ==
=== 1st ODI ===
9 August
(scorecard)

Zimbabwe; 207 (47.5 overs)	v	Bangladesh; 211/2 (34.3 overs)
Mark Vermeulen 92 (128); Nazmul Hossain 3/29 (6.5 overs)		Mohammad Ashraful 103* (103); Elton Chigumbura 1/33 (7 overs)

Bangladesh won by 8 wickets
Queens Sports Club, Bulawayo, Zimbabwe
Umpires: Amiesh Saheba (IND) & Russell Tiffin (ZIM)
Player of the match: Mohammad Ashraful

Bangladeshi captain Shakib Al Hasan won the toss and elected to field on an easy-paced track at the Queens Sports Club, Bulawayo. Bangladesh's opening bowler Syed Rasel got the tourists off to a good start dismissing Zimbabwean opener Hamilton Masakadza for a duck in the opening over. After five years out of the International game, Mark Vermeulen and number three Chamu Chibhabha, stabilised the innings with a second-wicket partnership of 25 from 37 balls, before Chibhabha was dismissed by Nazmul Hossain for seven. Joining Vermuelan at the crease was Wicket-keeper Brendan Taylor, and with the score on 2-25, looked to be giving Vermuelan support with 20 from 39 balls. Starting with a flicked boundary, Taylor was unlucky to be given out leg before wicket (lbw) to Shakib—after an inside edge—breaking the innings highest partnership (49). Joined at the crease by Charles Coventry, Vermuelan who was lucky to survive a lbw appeal off Shakib Al Hasan in the 13th over, went on to register his fifth ODI half century from 73 deliveries. Looking to be aggressive, Coventry was caught on the boundary with Mohammad Ashraful's first ball, after scoring 19.

=== 2nd ODI ===
11 August
(scorecard)

Bangladesh; 320/8 (50 overs)	v	Zimbabwe; 271 (46.1 overs)
Shakib Al Hasan 104 (64); Elton Chigumbura 3/59 (10 overs)		Sean Williams 75 (71); Shakib Al Hasan 2/39 (9 overs)

Bangladesh won by 49 runs
Queens Sports Club, Bulawayo, Zimbabwe
Umpires: Amiesh Saheba (IND) & Russell Tiffin (ZIM)
Player of the match: Shakib Al Hasan

=== 3rd ODI ===
14 August
(scorecard)

Zimbabwe; 323/7 (50 overs)	v	Bangladesh; 254 (44.2 overs)
Hamilton Masakadza 102 (112); Shakib Al Hasan 2/65 (10 overs)		Raqibul Hasan 78 (83); Tawanda Mupariwa 3/32 (7.2 overs)

Zimbabwe won by 69 runs
Queens Sports Club, Bulawayo, Zimbabwe
Umpires: Amiesh Saheba (IND) & Russell Tiffin (ZIM)
Player of the match: Elton Chigumbura

=== 4th ODI ===
16 August
(scorecard)

Zimbabwe; 312/8 (50 overs)	v	Bangladesh; 313/6 (47.5 overs)
Charles Coventry 194* (156); Ray Price 3/60 (10 overs)		Tamim Iqbal 154 (138); Enamul Haque Jr 2/51 (9 overs)

Bangladesh won by 4 wickets
Queens Sports Club, Bulawayo, Zimbabwe
Umpires: Kevan Barbour (ZIM) & Amiesh Saheba (IND)
Player of the match: Charles Coventry (Zim) & Tamim Iqbal (Ban)

- Charles Coventry's 194* was the joint highest individual score in a One Day International until Feb 24 2010, when Sachin Tendulkar of India broke the record and became the first man to reach 200 run mark in an ODI

=== 5th ODI ===
18 August
(scorecard)

Zimbabwe; 209 all out (46.4 overs)	v	Bangladesh; 212/5 (47.5 overs)
Brendan Taylor 61 (86); Ray Price 2/21 (10 overs)		Mushfiqur Rahim 98 (121); Dolar Mahmud 4/28 (8 overs)

Bangladesh won by 5 wickets
Queens Sports Club, Bulawayo, Zimbabwe
Umpires: Kevan Barbour (IND) & Amiesh Saheba (IND)
Player of the match: Dolar Mahmud

== Media coverage ==
Television

- Ten Sports (live) – Bangladesh, India, Pakistan, Sri Lanka and Middle East
