= Irish cricket team in Zimbabwe in 2010–11 =

Ireland cricket team in Zimbabwe in 2010
	Ireland	Zimbabwe
- Dates: 23 September 2010 – 30 September 2010
Captains	William Porterfield	Elton Chigumbura

One Day International series
- Results: Zimbabwe won the 3-match series 2–1
Most runs	Kevin O'Brien (109)	Tatenda Taibu (125)
Most wickets	George Dockrell (7)	Ed Rainsford (10)

The Ireland cricket team toured Zimbabwe from 26 September to 30 September 2010 for a three-match One Day International (ODI) series. Zimbabwe won the first two matches to win the series, before Ireland won the final match.

== ODI series ==
=== 1st ODI ===
26 September 2010
09:30
Scorecard

Ireland; 200 (47.3 overs)	v	Zimbabwe; 206/8 (50 overs)
Gary Wilson 69 (87); Ed Rainsford 4/23 (9 overs)		Tatenda Taibu 62 (106); George Dockrell 3/27 (10 overs)

Zimbabwe won by 2 wickets
Harare Sports Club, Harare
Umpires: Owen Chirombe (Zim) and Amiesh Saheba (Ind)
Player of the match: Ed Rainsford (Zim)

- Zimbabwe won the toss and elected to field.
- This was Zimbabwe's 100th victory in the ODI's

=== 2nd ODI ===
28 September 2010
09:30
Scorecard

Ireland; 238/9 (50 overs)	v	Zimbabwe; 239/7 (48.5 overs)
Kevin O'Brien 73* (102); Prosper Utseya 2/37 (10 overs)		Brendan Taylor 71 (99); Kevin O'Brien 2/33 (7 overs)

Zimbabwe won by 3 wickets
Harare Sports Club, Harare
Umpires: Amiesh Saheba (Ind) and Russell Tiffin (Zim)
Player of the match: Brendan Taylor (Zim)

- Zimbabwe won the toss and elected to field.

=== 3rd ODI ===
30 September 2010
09:30
Scorecard

Ireland; 244 (49.4 overs)	v	Zimbabwe; 224 (47.4 overs)
John Mooney 55 (61); Ed Rainsford 5/36 (9 overs)		Sean Williams 74 (86); Kevin O'Brien 3/27 (6.4 overs)

Ireland won by 20 runs
Harare Sports Club, Harare
Umpires: Amiesh Saheba (Ind) and Russell Tiffin (Zim)
Player of the match: John Mooney (Ire)

- Zimbabwe won the toss and elected to field.
- Ian Nicolson (Zim) made his ODI debut.
