= Indian cricket team in Zimbabwe in 1996–97 =

International cricket tour

The Indian national cricket team visited Zimbabwe in February 1997 and played two Limited Overs Internationals (LOIs) on 15 and 17 February 1997 at Queens Sports Club, Bulawayo, against the Zimbabwean national cricket team. Zimbabwe won by 8 wickets and were captained by Alistair Campbell; India by Sachin Tendulkar.

== ODI series summary ==
=== First ODI ===
15 February 1997
Scorecard

India; 168 (43.5 overs)	v	Zimbabwe; 139/2 (25.5 overs)
RR Singh 45 (62); HH Streak 5/32 (8.5 overs)		GW Flower 61* (71); A Kumble 1/18 (6 overs)

Zimbabwe won by 8 wickets (Duckworth/Lewis method)
Queens Sports Club, Bulawayo
Umpires: QJ Goosen (ZIM) and ID Robinson (ZIM)
Player of the match: HH Streak (ZIM)

- Zimbabwe won the toss and elected to field.
- The match was reduced before play started to 44 overs per side.
- Zimbabwe's target was further reduced to 136 runs in 38 overs.
- DN Ganesh (IND) made his ODI debut.

=== Second ODI ===
17 February 1997
Scorecard

Zimbabwe	v	India

Match abandoned
Harare Sports Club, Harare

- No toss
- Match abandoned due to a wet outfield.
