= Kenyan cricket team in Zimbabwe in 2002–03 =

The Kenya national cricket team visited Zimbabwe in December 2002 and played a three-match series of Limited Overs Internationals (LOI) against the Zimbabwean national cricket team. Zimbabwe won the series 2–0. Kenya were captained by Thomas Odoyo and Zimbabwe by Alistair Campbell.

== One Day Internationals (ODIs) ==
=== 1st ODI ===
8 December 2002
Scorecard

Kenya; 211 (50 overs)	v	Zimbabwe; 17/1 (5.1 overs)
HS Modi 55 (85); DA Marillier 3/39 (10 overs)		A Flower 8* (9)

No result
Harare Sports Club, Harare
Umpires: Aleem Dar (PAK) and MA Esat (ZIM)

- Kenya won the toss and elected to bat.
- Zimbabwe's target was 204 runs in 46 overs.

=== 2nd ODI ===
11 December 2002
Scorecard

Zimbabwe; 273/4 (50 overs)	v	Kenya; 181/6 (44 overs)
TJ Friend 91 (91); MA Suji 1/17 (10 overs)		KO Otieno 54 (73); GW Flower 1/27 (10 overs)

Zimbabwe won by 47 runs (D/L method)
Kwekwe Sports Club, Kwekwe
Umpires: Aleem Dar (PAK) and MA Esat (ZIM)
Player of the match: TJ Friend (ZIM)

- Kenya won the toss and elected to field.
- Kenya's target was 229 runs in 44 overs.

=== 3rd ODI ===
15 December 2002
Scorecard

Kenya; 133 (29 overs)	v	Zimbabwe; 136/1 (16 overs)
MO Odumbe 48 (51); HK Olonga 6/28 (9 overs)		AM Blignaut 63* (43); MA Suji 1/50 (7 overs)

Zimbabwe won by 9 wickets
Queens Sports Club, Bulawayo
Umpires: Aleem Dar (PAK) and KC Barbour (ZIM)
Player of the match: HK Olonga (ZIM)

- Kenya won the toss and elected to bat.
