= Afghan cricket team in Zimbabwe in 2009 =

	Afghanistan	Zimbabwe XI
- Dates: 16 August – 19 August 2009
Captains	Nowroz Mangal	Tatenda Taibu

The Afghanistan national cricket team visited Zimbabwe in August 2009 to play a first-class designated Inter-Continental Cup match against a Zimbabwe XI. Zimbabwe's participation in the Inter-Continental Cup has been considered a route back to playing Test Cricket. The full national team still participated in One Day Internationals and played a five match ODI series against Bangladesh during the same period.

== Inter-Continental Cup Match ==
16 August - 19 August
(scorecard)

Zimbabwe XI	v	Afghanistan
350 all out (81.5 overs); T Taibu 172 (211); Mohammad Nabi 3/90 (28.5 overs)		437 all out (130.1 overs); Noor Ali 130 (200); T Maruma 3/84 (26 overs)
446/9d (113.5 overs); T Taibu 120 (196); Dawlat Ahmadzai 2/40 (6 overs)		211/4 (44.5 overs); Noor Ali 100* (134); F Mutizwa 2/18 (3.5 overs)

Match Drawn
Mutare Sports Club, Mutare, Zimbabwe
Umpires: JJ Luck (NAM) and TJ Tapfumaneyi (ZIM)

- Afghanistan won the toss and chose to field
