= Bulawayo Athletic Club =

Sports club in Bulawayo, Zimbabwe

- Interactive map of Bulawayo Athletic Club

Ground information
- Location: Bulawayo, Matabeleland, Zimbabwe
- Country: Zimbabwe
- Coordinates: 20°09′53″S 28°35′37″E
- Establishment: 1894
- Capacity: 12,000
- Owner: Bulawayo Athletic Club
- Tenants: Zimbabwe Cricket
- End names
- n/a n/a

International information
- Only men's Test: 1–5 November 1992: Zimbabwe v New Zealand
- First men's ODI: 31 October 1992: Zimbabwe v New Zealand
- Last men's ODI: 27 June 2023: Ireland v United Arab Emirates
- First men's T20I: 11 July 2022: Jersey v United States
- Last men's T20I: 17 July 2022: Papua New Guinea v United States

Team information
Rhodesia	(1951)
Matabeleland	(1994-2009)
- As of 27 June 2023; Source: ESPNcricinfo

Bulawayo Athletic Club is a sports club in Bulawayo, Zimbabwe. The Bulawayo Athletic Club Ground is a 12,000-capacity stadium.

== History ==
The club was founded in 1894 and has been a significant venue for many international sporting events. Cricket is the main sport played at the club, but tennis, bowls, squash and billiards are also played.

On 12 August 2007, a fire broke out at the club, destroying the members' bar area and billiards rooms and causing damages of up to US$400,000. The Walkden Hall, the squash courts and the changing rooms were saved from the blaze. The fire was believed to have been started by an electrical fault.

At the Hockey Africa Cup of Champions held in Bulawayo in 2014, the Bulawayo Athletic Club ladies team reached the competition's final. Two Bulawayo Athletic Club players were in the gold medal winning Zimbabwe ladies hockey team at the 1980 Summer Olympics in Moscow, Patricia McKillop and Helen Volk.

== As a cricket venue ==
In the summer of 1992, the Zimbabwe national cricket team was granted Test status. Shortly afterwards, Bulawayo Athletic Club hosted one Test match (becoming the country's second Test venue, after Harare Sports Club) and one One Day International, with New Zealand the visitors in both.

New Zealand won the ODI, on 31 October, by 22 runs. The Test began the following day, but was badly hit by rain and a lack of adequate covering, with ten hours of play lost. In addition, the wicket was poor, as were the attendances (1,000 on the first day and a few hundred each day thereafter). Thus, when international cricket returned to Bulawayo, it was played at the nearby Queens Sports Club.

Bulawayo Athletic Club continued to host domestic matches, and along with Queens Sports Club served as a home ground for the Matabeleland team.

== International Centuries ==
=== Test Centuries ===
Only two Test centuries have been scored at the venue.

No.	Score	Player	Team	Balls	Opposing team	Date	Result
1	119	Rod Latham	New Zealand	214	Zimbabwe	1 November 1992	Drawn
2	101*	Kevin Arnott	Zimbabwe	200	New Zealand	1 November 1992	Drawn

=== One Day International Centuries ===
Four One Day International centuries have been scored at the venue.

No.	Score	Player	Team	Balls	Opposing team	Date	Result
1	157*	Calum MacLeod	Scotland	146	Afghanistan	4 March 2018	Won
2	127	Richie Berrington	Scotland	136	United Arab Emirates	23 June 2023	Won
3	136	Brandon McMullen	Scotland	121	Oman	25 June 2023	Won
4	162	Paul Stirling	Ireland	134	United Arab Emirates	27 June 2023	Won

== List of Five Wicket Hauls ==
=== Tests ===
Only one Test five wicket haul has been taken at the venue.

No.	Bowler	Date	Team	Opposing team	Inn	Overs	Runs	Wkts	Econ	Result
1	Dipak Patel	1 November 1992	New Zealand	Zimbabwe	2	40.4	113	6	2.77	Drawn

=== One Day Internationals ===
Two ODI five-wicket hauls have been taken at the venue.

No.	Bowler	Date	Team	Opposing team	Inn	Overs	Runs	Wkts	Result
1	Bilal Khan	25 June 2023	Oman	Scotland	1	10	55	5	Lost
2	Chris Greaves	25 June 2023	Scotland	Oman	2	10	53	5	Won

== See also ==
- List of Test cricket grounds
- One-Test wonder
