= Zimbabwean cricket team in New Zealand in 2000–01 =

The Zimbabwe national cricket team toured New Zealand in December 2000 and January 2001 and played one Test match against the New Zealand national cricket team followed by three Limited Overs Internationals (LOI). The single test was drawn. New Zealand were captained by Stephen Fleming and Zimbabwe by Heath Streak. Zimbabwe won the LOI series 2–1.

== Test series summary ==
26–30 December 2000
(5-day match)
Scorecard

New Zealand	v	Zimbabwe
487/7d (181 overs); CD McMillan 142 (209); BC Strang 3/116 (46 overs)		340/6d (138.5 overs); GJ Rennie 93 (323); CS Martin 5/71 (32.5 overs)
153/4d (40 overs); SP Fleming 55 (73); HH Streak 1/18 (5 overs)		60/2 (30 overs); GJ Rennie 37 (82); SB O'Connor 1/8 (8 overs)

Match drawn
Basin Reserve, Wellington
Umpires: BC Cooray (SL) and RS Dunne (NZ)
Player of the match: CD McMillan (NZ)

- New Zealand won the toss and elected to bat.
- DA Marillier (ZIM) made his Test debut.

== One Day Internationals (ODIs) ==
Zimbabwe won the series 2–1.

=== 1st ODI ===
2 January 2001 (D/N)
Scorecard

Zimbabwe; 300/7 (50 overs)	v	New Zealand; 210 (40 overs)
A Flower 80 (88); JEC Franklin 2/28 (5 overs)		SP Fleming 64 (79); DA Marillier 3/23 (4 overs)

Zimbabwe won by 70 runs (D/L method)
Owen Delany Park, Taupō
Umpires: DM Quested and EA Watkin
Player of the match: A Flower (ZIM)

- New Zealand won the toss and elected to field.
- New Zealand target was 281 runs in 43 overs.
- JEC Franklin and CS Martin (both NZ) made their ODI debuts.

=== 2nd ODI ===
4 January 2001 (D/N)
Scorecard

Zimbabwe; 236/7 (50 overs)	v	New Zealand; 237/2 (45.2 overs)
ADR Campbell 111 (133); CD McMillan 2/30 (8 overs)		NJ Astle 89* (115); BA Murphy 1/38 (10 overs)

New Zealand won by 8 wickets
Westpac Trust Stadium, Wellington
Umpires: RS Dunne and AL Hill
Player of the match: MS Sinclair (NZ)

- Zimbabwe won the toss and elected to bat.
- JDP Oram (NZ) and AJ Mackay (ZIM) made their ODI debuts.

=== 3rd ODI ===
7 January 2001
Scorecard

New Zealand; 273/9 (50 overs)	v	Zimbabwe; 274/9 (48.4 overs)
CD McMillan 75* (53); BA Murphy 3/43 (10 overs)		A Flower 81 (86); SB Styris 3/36 (9 overs)

Zimbabwe won by 1 wicket
Eden Park, Auckland
Umpires: BF Bowden and DB Cowie
Player of the match: HH Streak (ZIM)

- Zimbabwe won the toss and elected to field.
