= Douglas Hondo =

Zimbabwean cricketer (born 1979)

Personal information
- Full name: Douglas Tafadzwa Hondo
- Born: 7 July 1979 (age 47); Bulawayo, Zimbabwe Rhodesia
- Batting: Right-handed
- Bowling: Right-arm fast-medium
- Role: Bowler

International information
- National side: Zimbabwe (2001–2005)
- Test debut (cap 54): 7 September 2001 v South Africa
- Last Test: 14 January 2005 v Bangladesh
- ODI debut (cap 66): 3 October 2001 v England
- Last ODI: 29 January 2005 v Bangladesh

Domestic team information
- Years: Team
- 1999/2000: CFX Academy
- 2000/01: Midlands cricket team
- 2001/02–2004/05: Mashonaland

Career statistics
Competition	Test	ODI	FC	LA
Matches	9	56	50	102
Runs scored	83	127	651	286
Batting average	9.22	7.47	13.28	11.44
100s/50s	0/0	0/0	0/3	0/0
Top score	19	17	85*	39*
Balls bowled	1486	2381	7,344	4,381
Wickets	21	61	133	124
Bowling average	36.85	35.59	27.27	30.29
5 wickets in innings	1	0	3	0
10 wickets in match	0	0	0	0
Best bowling	6/59	4/37	6/59	4/32
Catches/stumpings	5/–	15/–	28/–	29/-
- Source: ESPNcricinfo, 10 September 2017

Douglas Tafadzwa Hondo (born 7 July 1979) is a former Zimbabwean cricketer, who played nine Test matches and 56 One Day Internationals as a right-arm medium-fast swing bowler, and is distinctive for his dreadlocks.

== Early career ==
Hondo was first introduced to cricket at the primary school, his elder brother being the first in the family to take up the game. Hondo and his brother were under the guidance of Peter Sharples, a pioneer of taking cricket into the townships, or "high-density suburbs" as they are known in Zimbabwe. He coached the Queensdale Primary School team which consisted mainly of players who had no family background in the game due to the Rhodesian racist policies.

Hondo was captain of the team in grades 6 and 7, opening the batting and the bowling. Like Tatenda Taibu and his mates, he attended Churchill School. He excelled, first as the under-15 captain and then in the full team, including taking 7–10 versus Gateway High School and scoring 121 versus Hillcrest.

== Domestic career ==
Hondo made the Mashonaland U-13 team and then the national U-15 team. A back injury put Hondo out of U-19 contention for a year but he made it to the CFX academy in 2000.

When he had finished at the academy, he was placed with the Midlands team in Kwekwe. Hondo was plagued by bad form, taking only 11 wickets at more than 50 runs apiece.

Not wanted for the tours after being dropped from the Zimbabwean squad, Hondo started playing club cricket in Adelaide with Stuart Matsikenyeri.

== International career ==
Despite this he was, surprisingly, called up for the first Test versus South Africa. Hondo assumed he was to be a net bowler but he was bowling well in the nets and then the first choice, Brighton Watambwa, was injured and Hondo made his debut. He did not bowl well, in a poor team performance, and South Africa scored 600–3 declared, Hondo taking the wicket of Gary Kirsten for 212. Hondo acquitted himself well with the bat, playing supportive innings to Andy Flower's pair of centuries, but was dismissed in the second innings with Flower stranded on 199*.

Dropped for the second Test, Hondo did play two ODIs against England but he was very inaccurate. Here in Australian season, he worked on his accuracy and was rewarded by being called up to the squad in India for the five-match ODI series. He did not play in the first two games but in the third he took three wickets,(Dinesh Mongia, Saurav Ganguly and VVS Laxman) and, along with Pommie Mbangwa, reduced India to 4 wickets for 51 runs. Hondo took the last wicket and Zimbabwe went on to win, with Hondo named as man of the match.

In the 2002 ICC Champions Trophy, he had another excellent performance against India at R. Premadasa Stadium, where he rattled the Indian top order by taking the wickets of Saurav Ganguly, Dinesh Mongia, Sachin Tendulkar and Yuvraj Singh and reduced them to 5/87. However, India recovered well thanks to the century from Kaif (111 not out) and 71 from Dravid and won the match by 14 runs. Four days later, in his next match he had the bowling figure of 4/45 against England in the same tournament.

Hondo toured England in 2003 but did not do well.

A series of back and hamstring injuries mean he has not played international cricket since January 2005.

== Coaching career ==
Following a difference of opinion with Zimbabwe Cricket, (who insisted that four players sporting dreadlocks either had their hair cut or were dropped) Hondo made his way to England.

He became Head Coach for Shepherd Neame league side Upminster CC and played in the Devon Cricket League, for Premier Side Sandford – in his first game he took 2 wickets for 10runs off 6 overs.

In 2011 Hondo become Player/Coach for Two Counties Cricket Division 1 side Ipswich Cricket Club. After a successful campaign in 2011 Hondo will return in 2012 to resume his duties as both Player and Coach.

In 2012 Hondo played for the Hawera United Cricket Club, in New Zealand over 2 seasons.

He was appointed as fast-bowling coach at Essex County Cricket Club in December 2025, having had a temporary role at the club during that year's county season.
