= Graeme Cremer =

Zimbabwean cricketer

Personal information
- Full name: Alexander Graeme Cremer
- Born: 19 September 1986 (age 40); Harare, Zimbabwe
- Batting: Right-handed
- Bowling: Right-arm leg break
- Role: Bowler

International information
- National side: Zimbabwe (2005–present)
- Test debut (cap 67): 6 January 2005 v Bangladesh
- Last Test: 26 December 2017 v South Africa
- ODI debut (cap 103): 27 January 2009 v Kenya
- Last ODI: 20 September 2026 v Australia
- ODI shirt no.: 30
- T20I debut (cap 20): 13 October 2008 v Canada
- Last T20I: 29 August 2026 v South Africa

Domestic team information
- Years: Team
- 2004/05: Mashonaland
- 2006/07–2008/09: Northerns
- 2009/10–2018/19: Mid West Rhinos
- 2017: Comilla Victorians

Career statistics
Competition	Test	ODI	T20I	FC
Matches	19	97	36	89
Runs scored	540	745	71	2,887
Batting average	16.36	14.32	5.07	23.47
100s/50s	1/0	0/1	0/0	3/10
Top score	102*	58	17	171*
Balls bowled	4,214	4,734	708	19,426
Wickets	57	121	40	374
Bowling average	45.68	30.16	21.52	27.86
5 wickets in innings	1	3	0	20
10 wickets in match	0	0	0	4
Best bowling	5/125	6/46	3/11	9/114
Catches/stumpings	12/–	37/–	12/–	63/–
- Source: ESPNcricinfo, 20 September 2026

Alexander Graeme Cremer (born 19 September 1986) is a Zimbabwean cricketer who captained the national cricket team between May 2016 and March 2018. He is a leg-spinner who got into the Zimbabwe team at the age of eighteen, following the exit of Paul Strang, Andy Whittall and Ray Price.

== Early career ==
Educated at the prestigious Prince Edward School, Cremer was quite prolific in school cricket, taking many wickets. He made his Test debut against Bangladesh in Dhaka on 6 January 2005, a match that Zimbabwe went on to lose handing the Bangladeshi Tigers their first ever Test match victory.

== International career ==
Cremer then played Tests against South Africa and New Zealand. Unfortunately Cremer, seen by many as a Test specialist, had his opportunities limited thereafter due to Zimbabwe's self-imposed exile from Test cricket. After several years on the fringes of the national team Cremer finally broke into the limited overs squad against the West Indies in late 2007. However, Zimbabwe's strong spin attack of Ray Price and Prosper Utseya meant he did not get any game time. It wasn't until the Al Barakah Cup Twenty20 tournament in Canada that Cremer was finally given a chance in the shorter format, and he made the most of it by taking 2/10 from his 3 overs.

He continued to be part of the squad in the subsequent series against Sri Lanka and Bangladesh, often named 12th man. His ODI debut came in January 2009 against Kenya, and his first ODI series was outstanding. He finished the tournament as the leading wicket taker, with 15 wickets from 5 matches at an average of 11.46.

Cremer has also developed into a bowling all-rounder. His highest First Class score is an unbeaten 171 in the 2006–07 Logan Cup, while his First Class and List A averages are in the 20s.

When Zimbabwe returned to Test cricket in 2011, Cremer missed the one-off Tests against Bangladesh, Pakistan and New Zealand due to injury. He was called up for his return to Test cricket, over six years since his last Test, for the one-off Test against New Zealand in January 2012. Cremer announced his retirement from Zimbabwe Cricket after disputes over payments in 2013, focusing instead on becoming a professional golfer. However, in 2015 he made a surprise U-turn to play for Zimbabwe again and was selected for the Pakistan tour.

=== Captaincy ===
Cremer was appointed as the interim captain of Zimbabwe team and they played first match under Cremer against India in June 2016. Despite loss all 3 ODIs against India, Zimbabwe won first T20I by 2 wickets, which was first victory under Cremer.

Next, Zimbabwe played another home series against New Zealand, which was also whitewashed by New Zealand 2–0. However, prior to Sri Lanka test tour, former Zimbabwean cricketer Heath Streak was appointed as the coach and Cremer stood as the captain for the series.

During the first Test at Harare, Cremer took four crucial wickets in Sri Lankan first innings and while bat, also scored his maiden Test century, guiding his team to avoid follow-on. With this, He became the first Zimbabwe player and only the seventh captain to make a hundred and take four wickets in an innings of a Test. His efforts in both innings of the Test ended in vain, where they lost the match by 225 runs. During the first test, Cremer set a record for facing the most number of balls as a number 8 batsman in a test match facing 351 balls just after Wasim Akram who faced 363 balls as number 8 batsman in a single test. However, Cremer was awarded man of the match for his all-round performance in the match. Zimbabwe lost this series 0–2.

The test series was followed by a tri-series also featuring West Indies. Under Cremer, Zimbabwe advanced to the finals of a tri-series for the first time in six years with four different results – a loss, a tie, a no-result and a win. Zimbabwe lost the finals to Sri Lanka, however.

However, under his captaincy, Zimbabwe recorded their first ODI series win against Sri Lanka, which is recorded as their only fourth series win in all time. In the series, Zimbabwe recorded the first 300+ successful chase in Sri Lanka soil for the first time in 296 ODIs in Sri Lanka as well.

His captaincy improved better and better with every game in all formats. On 16 July 2017, in the one-off test against Sri Lanka at R Premadasa Stadium, Cremer took his maiden test five-wicket haul. With that, Cremer became the first Zimbabwe captain to take a five-wicket haul as well. However, Zimbabwe lost the match by 4 wickets, where Sri Lanka successfully chased 388 runs to post highest ever run-chase in Asia in tests. Cremer took 9 wickets in the match for 275 runs, which was recorded as best by a Zimbabwe captain in Tests.

In March 2018, after Zimbabwe failed to progress from the 2018 Cricket World Cup Qualifier tournament in Zimbabwe, Cremer was sacked by Zimbabwe Cricket.

=== Post-captaincy ===
In January 2019, Cremer relocated to Dubai with his wife, Merna Moore and their two children after Moore accepted a position as pilot for Emirates. In April 2019, he acted as a coaching consultant for the United Arab Emirates cricket team for their tour to Zimbabwe. He was also the academy director of Rajasthan Royals Cricket Academy.

Cremer returned to Zimbabwe in 2025 and resumed his playing career. He was included in the Zimbabwe squad for the three-match T20I series against Afghanistan in October 2025 but did not play in any of the matches. In November 2025, in his first first-class match since December 2017, he took his best innings figures of 9 for 144 for Mid West Rhinos in the Logan Cup. He was included in Zimbabwe's squad for the 2026 Men's T20 World Cup.

After a nine-year break, Cremer returned to the Zimbabwe Test team for the match against Afghanistan in Sharjah in November 2026.
