= Tinashe Panyangara =

Zimbabwean cricketer (born 1985)

Personal information
- Full name: Tinashe Panyangara
- Born: 21 October 1985 (age 41); Marondera, Zimbabwe
- Batting: Right-handed
- Bowling: Right-arm fast-medium
- Role: Bowler

International information
- National side: Zimbabwe
- Test debut: 6 May 2004 v Sri Lanka
- Last Test: 12 November 2014 v Bangladesh
- ODI debut: 20 April 2004 v Sri Lanka
- Last ODI: 14 March 2015 v India
- ODI shirt no.: 48

Career statistics
Competition	Tests	ODIs	FC	LA
Matches	9	44	46	86
Runs scored	201	158	945	480
Batting average	16.75	5.64	16.29	9.23
100s/50s	0/0	0/0	0/2	0/0
Top score	40*	16*	89	40
Balls bowled	1,889	2,185	7,210	3,984
Wickets	31	46	120	87
Bowling average	26.22	46.56	27.20	39.52
5 wickets in innings	1	0	2	0
10 wickets in match	0	0	0	0
Best bowling	5/59	3/28	5/59	4/26
Catches/stumpings	3/–	8/–	17/–	14/–
- Source: ESPNcricinfo, 22 May 2015

Tinashe Panyangara (born 21 October 1985 in Marondera) is a Zimbabwean cricketer. He is a right-arm fast-medium bowler.

Panyangara first came to prominence during the under-19s World Cup in Bangladesh in 2003–04 in which he bowled 6 for 31 in a surprising victory for the Zimbabweans. Panyangara was rated as one of the fastest Zimbabwean bowlers in their history. Following the sacking of fifteen rebel players in 2004, he found himself launched into the Zimbabwean squad instead of being able to complete his A-levels as he had previously wished to do.

He lasted less than a year in the national side, before developing a stress fracture in his back in early 2005 that kept him away from competitive cricket for a year.

Panyangara plays cricket in England during the summer months at Barkisland Cricket Club. He has since moved to Nottingham where he plays for the West Indies Cavaliers. Recently he has started playing for the CATS Cricket Club in Australia.
