= Elton Chigumbura =

Zimbabwean cricketer

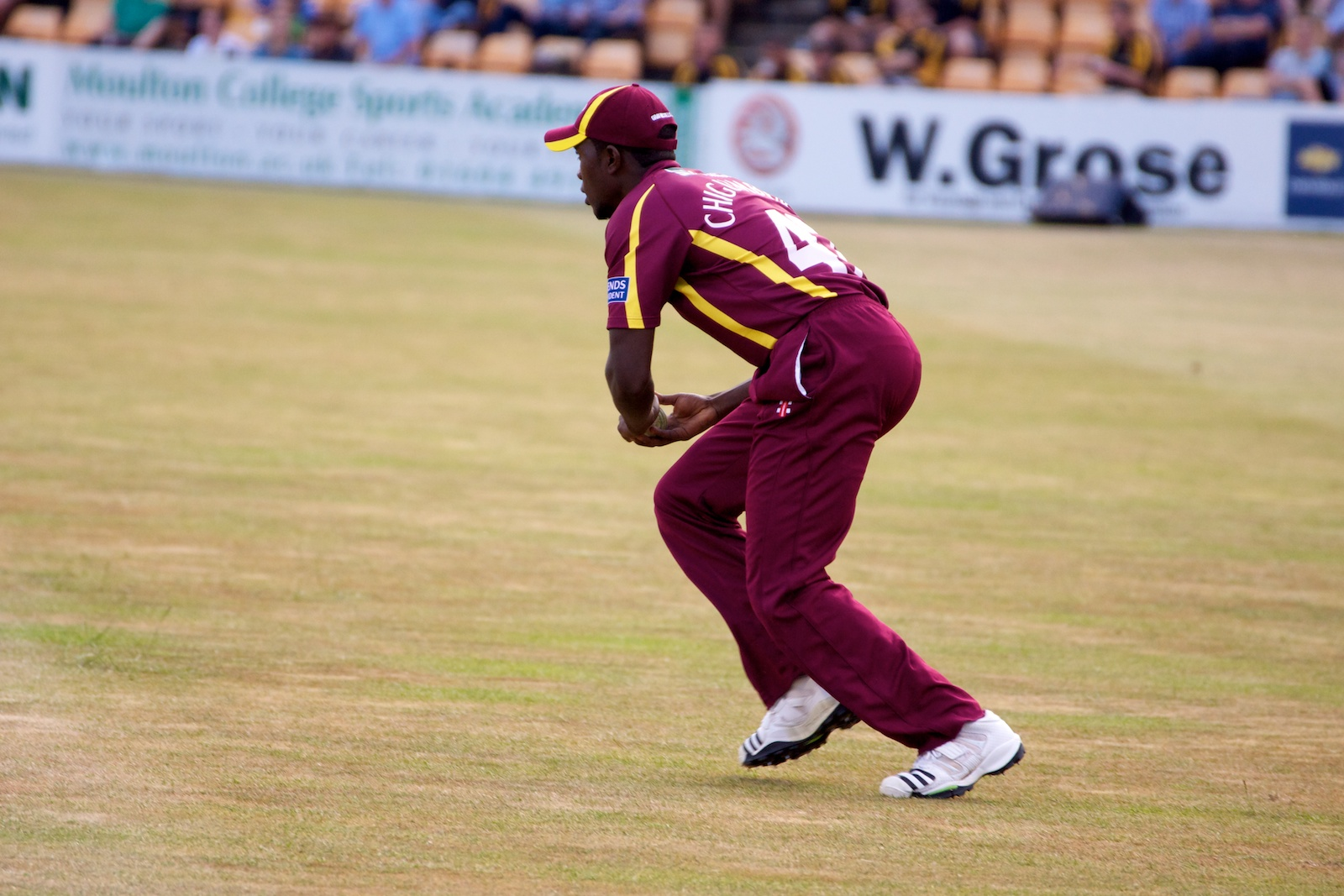

Personal information
- Born: 14 March 1986 (age 40); Kwekwe, Zimbabwe
- Batting: Right-handed
- Bowling: Right-arm medium-fast
- Role: All-rounder

International information
- National side: Zimbabwe (2004–2020)
- Test debut (cap 61): 6 May 2004 v Sri Lanka
- Last Test: 12 November 2014 v Bangladesh
- ODI debut (cap 78): 20 April 2004 v Sri Lanka
- Last ODI: 26 October 2018 v Bangladesh
- ODI shirt no.: 47
- T20I debut (cap 3): 28 November 2006 v Bangladesh
- Last T20I: 10 November 2020 v Pakistan
- T20I shirt no.: 47

Domestic team information
- Years: Team
- 2002/03–2004/05: Mashonaland
- 2005/2006: Manicaland
- 2006/07–2008/09: Northerns
- 2009/10–2020/21: Mashonaland Eagles
- 2010: Northamptonshire
- 2010/11: Southern Rocks
- 2013: Sylhet Royals
- 2013/14: Sheikh Jamal Dhanmondi Club
- 2014: Barbados Tridents
- 2014/15: Kala Bagan Krira Chakra
- 2015: Chittagong Vikings
- 2016: Quetta Gladiators
- 2017: Speenghar Tigers

Career statistics
Competition	Test	ODI	T20I	FC
Matches	14	213	57	107
Runs scored	569	4,340	893	5,600
Batting average	21.07	25.23	19.00	32.18
100s/50s	0/3	2/19	0/3	6/37
Top score	88	117	54*	186
Balls bowled	1,806	4,339	276	11,048
Wickets	21	101	16	209
Bowling average	46.00	42.31	26.68	28.88
5 wickets in innings	1	0	0	4
10 wickets in match	0	0	0	0
Best bowling	5/54	4/28	4/31	5/54
Catches/stumpings	6/–	72/–	22/–	51/–
- Source: ESPNcricinfo, 11 February 2024

Elton Chigumbura (born 14 March 1986) is a Zimbabwean former cricketer, who played for the national cricket team between 2004 and 2020.

He was educated at Churchill School (Harare) and made his debut at the age of 18, amidst the rebel crisis and played 14 Test matches. Chigumbura was the most capped player in the Zimbabwean ODI squad at the time, with more than 200 caps.

In May 2015, Chigumbura made his maiden ODI century, against Pakistan in Lahore, in his 174th ODI match. With more than 4,000 runs and 100 wickets in ODIs, he is widely regarded as one of Zimbabwe's greatest all-rounders. In June 2016, during India's tour to Zimbabwe, he played in his 200th ODI match, with 197 of these for Zimbabwe and three for Africa XI.

In November 2020, Chigumbura retired from international cricket following the conclusion of the T20I series against Pakistan.

== Domestic career ==
Chigumbura made his first-class debut for Mashonaland aged just fifteen and went on to represent Zimbabwe in two consecutive Under-19 World Cups. He took four wickets in their upset win over Australia in the Under-19 World Cup in Bangladesh.

In March 2010, Chigumbura signed for Northamptonshire County Cricket Club as an overseas player, giving him the chance to return to England after having a short spell at Eppleton Cricket Club.

He was the leading run-scorer for Mashonaland Eagles in the 2017–18 Pro50 Championship tournament, with 243 runs in seven matches.

== International career ==
=== Before captaincy ===
He made his international debut sooner than expected due to the absence of the 'rebel' players, playing his first Test aged just 18 during a tour of Sri Lanka. It was a demoralising tour for Zimbabwe and Chigumbura looked out of his depth. He missed the majority of 2005 due to a stress fracture in his back which he picked up during a series against South Africa in March.

Prior to Zimbabwe being barred from Test cricket in 2005, he went on to play 6 Tests for his country. He struggled with the bat, making five ducks in his twelve innings. He made one half century, an innings of 71 against Bangladesh in Chittagong. It turned out to be a good game for Chigumbura as he followed up his batting performance with a career best bowling return of 5/54

He has had more success in ODI cricket, playing some memorable innings. In May 2004 he scored 77 against Australia at Harare but arguably his greatest performance came later in the year against Sri Lanka in the Champions Trophy. In a man of the match winning effort he made 57 with the bat and took 3/37 with the ball.

The next year in a game against Bangladesh in Harare he put on 165 runs for 6th wicket with Stuart Matsikenyeri as they successfully chased down 246 to win with 5 balls in hand. Chigumbura contributed 70 off 68 deliveries. At the same ground against the same opponent in February 2007 he equalled his highest ODI score of 77 in an innings that included 7 sixes. At the conclusion of the game only 3 other Zimbabwean cricketers had hit more sixes than Chigumbura in their one-day careers.

Chigumbura was part of the Zimbabwean squad for the 2007 World Cup in the West Indies. He registered new career-best ODI bowling figures of 3/25 and scored 38 runs from 34 balls in Zimbabwe's shock win against the West Indies on 30 November 2007.

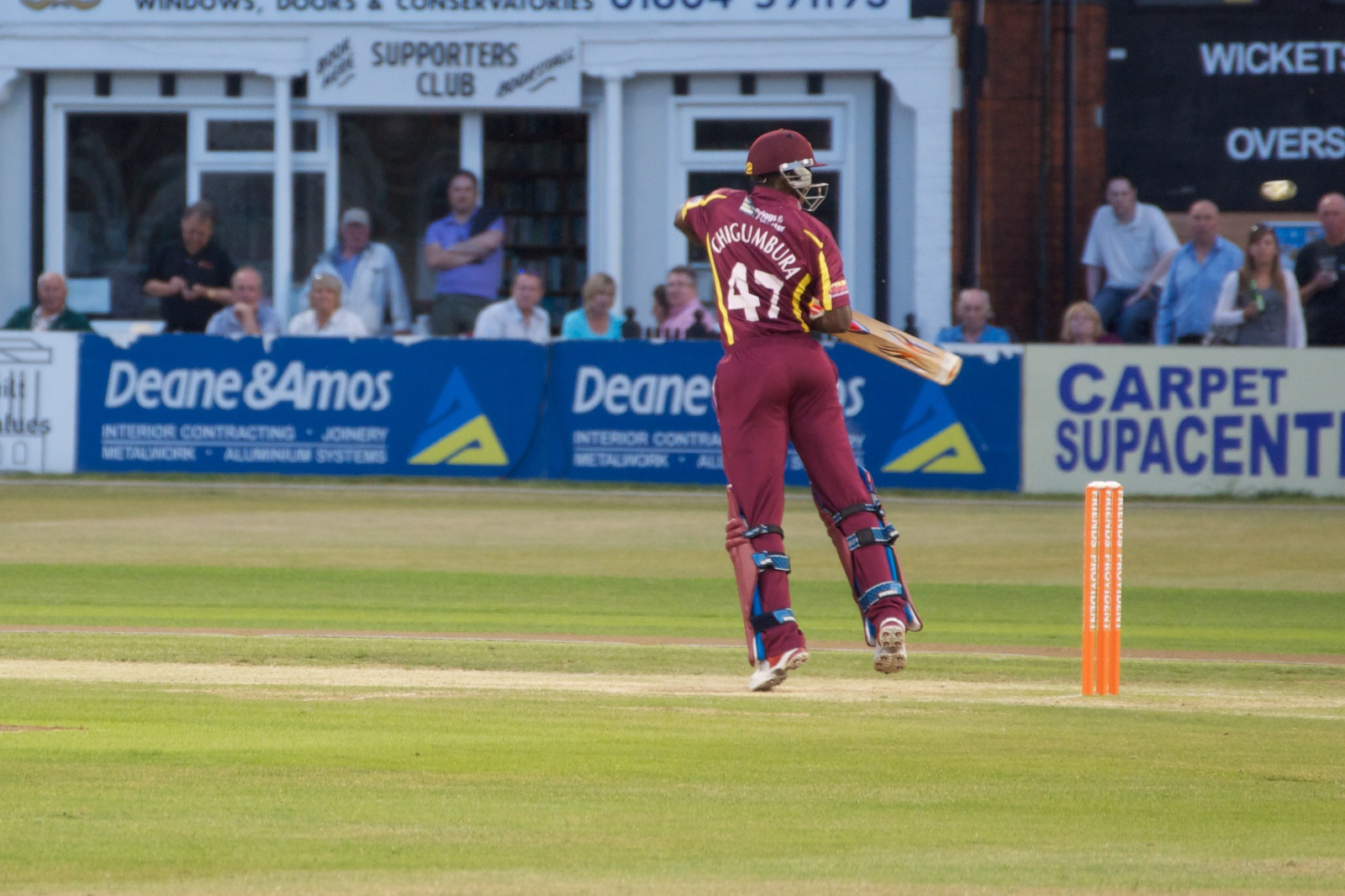
Chigumbura batting for Northamptonshire

=== Captaincy ===
In May 2010, Chigumbura replaced Prosper Utseya as Zimbabwe's captain. He led Zimbabwe to the 2011 World Cup, but resigned within months of the tournament in which Zimbabwe defeated only Canada and Kenya and failed to qualify for the quarter-finals.

He was replaced in the captaincy by Brendan Taylor.

In August 2014, Chigumbura was named Zimbabwean captain for second time. He was appointed ODI and T20 captain as Brendan Taylor retained the leadership in the Tests as part of Zimbabwe Cricket's decision to split the captaincy across formats.

He scored 90 runs off 122 balls with 10 fours and two sixes in defeat against South Africe at Queens Sports Club in Bulawayo. Out of 165 runs Chigumbura scored 54.5 percentage of team runs.

Chigumbura's unbeaten 52 engineered the chase that led Zimbabwe to their first victory over Australia in 31 years.

In January 2016 Chigumbura stepped down as captain of Zimbabwe following the conclusion of the Twenty20 International series against Bangladesh.

=== Post captaincy ===
He was retained in the team for Zimbabwe's victorious return to Test cricket in a one-off match against Bangladesh in August 2011, taking three wickets, before a knee injury ruled him out of the following Test against Pakistan. Chigumbura had earlier led Zimbabwe in 24 limited-overs games from May 2010 to March 2011 in which his form was fell away.

In March 2014, Chigumbura scored a quickfire 53 from No. 6 to complete the chase in 13.4 overs against UAE at 2014 ICC World Twenty20 in Bangladesh. He started with a six and a four in his first two balls, and maintained the same intensity throughout his innings. His last shot was a straight six not only took Zimbabwe over the line it also brought him his half-century off 21 balls.

== Playing style ==
He is an aggressive batsman, who generally bats in the middle order for his team. He is strong on the lofted drive and he consistently clears the fence in ODI with his big hitting in the final overs. He is also a useful seam bowler, regarded as being his country's fastest in the current squad, clocking at more than 140 km/h when at his peak. In the field he is an athletic outfielder, once taking 4 catches in an ODI against the West Indies at Queen's Park Oval.

Preceded by Prosper Utseya	ODI & T20I Captains; 2010–2011	Succeeded by Brendan Taylor
Preceded by Brendan Taylor	ODI & T20I Captains; 2014–2016	Succeeded by Hamilton Masakadza
