= Tawanda Mupariwa =

Zimbabwean cricketer (born 1985)

Personal information
- Full name: Tawanda Mupariwa
- Born: 16 April 1985 (age 41); Bulawayo, Zimbabwe
- Batting: Right-handed
- Bowling: Right-arm fast-medium
- Role: Bowler

International information
- National side: Zimbabwe
- Only Test (cap 66): 14 May 2004 v Sri Lanka
- ODI debut (cap 82): 27 April 2004 v Sri Lanka
- Last ODI: 16 August 2009 v Bangladesh

Domestic team information
- Years: Team
- 2001–present: Matabeleland Tuskers

Career statistics
Competition	Test	ODI	FC	LA
Matches	1	35	49	80
Runs scored	15	165	1,171	465
Batting average	15.00	8.68	16.97	11.34
100s/50s	0/0	0/0	0/3	0/0
Top score	14	33	64*	49
Balls bowled	204	1,773	8,181	3,655
Wickets	0	55	142	102
Bowling average	–	26.29	28.67	30.75
5 wickets in innings	–	0	2	0
10 wickets in match	–	0	0	0
Best bowling	–	4/39	5/48	4/22
Catches/stumpings	0/–	8/–	19/–	16/–
- Source: CricketArchive, 12 December 2009

Tawanda Mupariwa (born 16 April 1985) is a Zimbabwean cricketer. He is a right arm fast-medium seam bowler who was brought into the international side after the record low 35 all out in the third One Day International (ODI) against Sri Lanka. He became the fastest player for Zimbabwe to take 50 wickets in ODIs, achieving it in 28 games. He also played in one Test match in 2004.
