= Stuart Matsikenyeri =

Zimbabwean cricketer

Personal information
- Full name: Stuart Matsikenyeri
- Born: 3 May 1983 (age 43); Harare, Zimbabwe
- Batting: Right-handed
- Bowling: Right-arm off break

International information
- National side: Zimbabwe (2002–2015)
- Test debut (cap 59): 4 November 2003 v West Indies
- Last Test: 11 March 2005 v South Africa
- ODI debut (cap 70): 23 November 2002 v Pakistan
- Last ODI: 24 February 2015 v West Indies
- T20I debut (cap 7): 28 November 2006 v Bangladesh
- Last T20I: 20 September 2012 v South Africa

Career statistics
| Competition | Test | ODI | T20I | FC |
|---|---|---|---|---|
| Matches | 8 | 113 | 10 | 125 |
| Runs scored | 351 | 2,224 | 76 | 6,334 |
| Batting average | 23.40 | 22.01 | 7.60 | 30.59 |
| 100s/50s | 0/2 | 0/13 | 0/0 | 9/35 |
| Top score | 57 | 90 | 32 | 201 |
| Balls bowled | 483 | 920 | 16 | 4,191 |
| Wickets | 2 | 16 | 0 | 67 |
| Bowling average | 172.50 | 48.62 | – | 42.62 |
| 5 wickets in innings | 0 | 0 | 0 | 1 |
| 10 wickets in match | 0 | 0 | 0 | 0 |
| Best bowling | 1/58 | 2/25 | – | 5/41 |
| Catches/stumpings | 7/– | 37/– | 82/– | 82/– |
- Source: ESPNcricinfo, 26 October 2017

Stuart Matsikenyeri (born 3 May 1983) is a former Zimbabwean cricketer, who played all formats of the game. He was a right-handed batsman and usually opened the batting for Zimbabwe. Matsikenyeri also bowled part-time right-arm off-break and was a sharp gully fielder.

== International career ==
Matsikenyeri was a promising junior player and represented Zimbabwe at U-16 and U-19 levels. It was thus no surprise when he made his international debut against Pakistan in November 2002, opening the batting. He participated in the 2003 Cricket World Cup, although he only played in one game. Later in the year, he played in the NatWest Series in England and scored a crucial 44 at Trent Bridge as Zimbabwe pulled off an upset win.

His strengths are on the cut and pull but he has at times struggled against high quality pace bowling in international cricket, often getting out to loose shots. In 2006 he spent time out of the side after refusing to sign a new contract with the board. He returned however and went on to bring up his 1,000th ODI run for Zimbabwe in early 2007, becoming one of only four players in the 2007 World Cup squad to have done so.

Included in the 2007 World Cup squad, he was the only remaining member of the 2003 World Cup Zimbabwe squad. Matsikenyeri won man of the match award for his knock of 89, which is his highest ODI score, where he guided his team in to victory against Bangladesh.

In 2009, he along with Tatenda Taibu set the record for the highest 6th wicket partnership for Zimbabwe in ODIs (188)
