= Queens Sports Club =

Stadium in Zimbabwe

- QSC
- Interactive map of Queens Sports Club

Ground information
- Location: Parkview, Bulawayo, Zimbabwe
- Country: Zimbabwe
- Coordinates: 20°08′42″S 28°35′20″E
- Establishment: 1890
- Capacity: 9,000
- Owner: Bulawayo City Council
- Tenants: Zimbabwe Cricket; Matabeleland Tuskers
- End names
- City End; Airport End

International information
- First men's Test: 20–24 October 1994: Zimbabwe v Sri Lanka
- Last men's Test: 7–9 August 2025: Zimbabwe v New Zealand
- First men's ODI: 15 December 1996: Zimbabwe v England
- Last men's ODI: 28 November 2024: Zimbabwe v Pakistan
- First men's T20I: 11 May 2013: Zimbabwe v Bangladesh
- Last men's T20I: 18 September 2025: Zimbabwe v Namibia
- First women's ODI: 10 November 2021: Zimbabwe v Bangladesh
- Last women's ODI: 2 October 2025: Zimbabwe v United Arab Emirates
- First women's T20I: 5 October 2025: Zimbabwe v United Arab Emirates
- Last women's T20I: 6 October 2025: Zimbabwe v United Arab Emirates

Team information
Matabeleland Tuskers	(2009–present)
- As of 21 December 2024; Source: ESPNcricinfo

Queens Sports Club Ground is a stadium in Bulawayo, Zimbabwe. It is used primarily used for cricket matches. The stadium has a capacity of up to 13,000. The stadium is the home ground for the Matabeleland Tuskers, who are the current Logan Cup champions. The other cricket ground in Bulawayo is the Bulawayo Athletic Club.

Queen's Sports Club is Zimbabwe's second ground, the first being the Harare Sports Club. It is situated close to the city center is one of international cricket's most picturesque venues, with an old pavilion surrounded by trees which give shade to spectators. Much of the ground consists of grass banking and its capacity of 13,000 is more than enough to cope with demand. Queens Sports Club became Zimbabwe's third Test venue in October 1994. The Zimbabwe national cricket team has had much success at this venue, beating teams like England, West Indies, Australia, Pakistan and the once weak Bangladesh. In recent times however it has been a stadium of horror for the locals, as it was at this venue where Zimbabwe lost to lower ranked Afghanistan.

During a Currie Cup match between Eastern Province and Rhodesia in 1954/55, the scorers' box became a mass of smoke and sparks after electrical equipment was struck by lightning.

Queens Sports Club serves as the primary venue for the 2026 Under-19 Men’s Cricket World Cup, which is scheduled to host a total of eleven tournament fixtures, including the one knockout 1st Semi-final. Despite hosting the most matches of the event, Harare Sports Club will host the final of the tournament.

== See also ==
- List of international cricket five-wicket hauls at the Queens Sports Club
- List of Test cricket grounds
