= 2024 Zim Afro T10 =

Second edition of the Zim Afro T10 League

- Dates: 21 – 29 September 2024
- Administrator: Zimbabwe Cricket
- Cricket format: T10
- Tournament format(s): Round-robin and playoffs
- Champions: Joburg Bangla Tigers (1st title)
- Runners-up: Cape Town Samp Army
- Participants: 6
- Matches: 25
- Player of the series: Sikandar Raza (Joburg Bangla Tigers)
- Most runs: Rassie van der Dussen (NYS Lagos) (256)
- Most wickets: Richard Gleeson (Harare Bolts) (12)

The 2024 Zim Afro T10 was the second season of the Zim Afro T10. The tournament was held from 21 to 29 September at the Harare Sports Club. Durban Wolves, formerly known as Durban Qalandars, were the defending champions.

In the final, Joburg Bangla Tigers defeated Cape Town Samp Army by five runs to win their inaugural title.

== Background ==
On 7 September 2024, it was announced that the Zim Afro T10 would return for a second season, being held from 21 September to 29 September at Harare Sports Club in Harare.

The six franchises chose their direct signings before the draft, adding a 16th player as a "global icon". On 8 September, the players draft was held, with 600 players entering the draft. Former Zimbabwean captain and batsman Sikandar Raza was the first pick.

=== Teams ===
Team	Debut	Captain	Head coach
Bulawayo Brave Jaguars	2023	David Warner	Owais Shah
Harare Bolts	2023	Dasun Shanaka	Pubudu Dassanayake
Cape Town Samp Army	2023	Rohan Mustafa	James Foster
Durban Wolves	2023	Yasir Shah	Moin Khan
Joburg Bangla Tigers	2023	Chris Lynn	Julian Wood
NYS Lagos	2024	Thisara Perera	Chaminda Vaas

=== Squads ===
Bulawayo Brave Jaguars	Cape Town Samp Army	Durban Wolves	Harare Bolts	Joburg Bangla Tigers	NYS Lagos
David Warner (c); Sabir Ali; Carlos Brathwaite; Victor Chirwa; Akila Dananjaya; Brad Evans; Laurie Evans; Anamul Haque; Kobe Herft; Nick Hobson; Wesley Madhevere; Wellington Masakadza; Kirk McKenzie; Richard Ngarava; Panashe Taruvinga; Vihas Thewmika	Rohan Mustafa (c); Qais Ahmad; Haider Ali; Brian Bennett; Brian Chari; Ben Curran; Shahnawaz Dahani; Michael Frost; Salman Irshad; Sineth Jayawardena; Leonardo Julien; Dawid Malan; Tawanda Maposa; Tadiwanashe Marumani; Gulbadin Naib; Adam Rossington; David Willey	Yasir Shah (c); Gary Ballance; Emmanuel Bawa; Regis Chakabva; Mark Chapman; Raveen de Silva; Mohammad Irfan; Mbeki Joseph; Innocent Kaia; Mohammad Rohid Khan; Sharjeel Khan; Tinotenda Maposa; Colin Munro; Will Smeed; Donald Tiripano; Muhammad Waseem; Dawlat Zadran	Dasun Shanaka (c); Faraz Akram; Alex Falao; Richard Gleeson; Rishad Hossain; Shehan Jayasuriya; Luke Jongwe; Kennar Lewis; Brandon Mavuta; Lahiru Milantha; George Munsey; James Neesham; Michael Palmer; Janishka Perera; Junaid Siddiqui; Arinesto Vezha; Sean Williams	Sikandar Raza (c); Chris Lynn; Charith Asalanka; Tendai Chatara; Johnathan Campbell; Karim Janat; Adam Milne; Kusal Perera; Hazratullah Zazai; Mohammad Shahzad; George Linde; Luke Wood; Tinashe Muchawaya; Tashinga Musekiwa; Kevin Koththigoda; Antum Naqvi; Kimani Melius	Thisara Perera (c); Asif Ali; Joshua Bishop; Akhilesh Bodugum; Ryan Burl; Avishka Fernando; Binura Fernando; Matiullah Khan; Clive Madande; Nyasha Mayavo; Blessing Muzarabani; Dion Myers; Newman Nyamhuri; Romario Roach; Kaveesh Sathsara; Oshane Thomas; Najibullah Zadran

== Points table ==
Pos	Team	Pld	W	L	NR	Pts	NRR	Qualification
1	Harare Bolts	7	5	2	0	10	1.950	Advanced to Qualifier 1
2	Joburg Bangla Tigers	7	5	2	0	10	0.965	Advanced to Qualifier 1
3	NYS Lagos	7	5	2	0	10	0.858	Advanced to Eliminator
4	Cape Town Samp Army	7	4	3	0	8	0.300	Advanced to Eliminator
5	Bulawayo Brave Jaguars	7	1	6	0	2	−1.539	
6	Durban Wolves	7	1	6	0	2	−2.579	

Source: Cricbuzz

== League stage ==
The full fixtures were confirmed on 13 September 2024.

Match 1
21 September 2024
15:00
Scorecard

Durban Wolves; 106/5 (10 overs)	v	Joburg Bangla Tigers; 109/2 (7.4 overs)
Mark Chapman 38 (16); Antum Naqvi 1/8 (1 over)		Hazratullah Zazai 44 (18); Donald Tiripano 1/23 (1 over)

Joburg Bangla Tigers won by 8 wickets
Harare Sports Club, Harare
Player of the match: Hazratullah Zazai (Joburg Bangla Tigers)

- Joburg Bangla Tigers won the toss and elected to field.

Match 2
21 September 2024
17:15 (D/N)
Scorecard

Cape Town Samp Army; 103/5 (10 overs)	v	Harare Bolts; 105/5 (9.3 overs)
Leonardo Julien 34* (16); Richard Gleeson 3/8 (2 overs)		James Neesham 30* (16); Tawanda Maposa 1/11 (1.3 overs)

Harare Bolts won by 5 wickets
Harare Sports Club, Harare
Player of the match: Richard Gleeson (Harare Bolts)

- Harare Bolts won the toss and elected to field.

Match 3
21 September 2024
19:30 (N)
Scorecard

Bulawayo Brave Jaguars; 101/4 (10 overs)	v	NYS Lagos; 102/3 (9.4 overs)
Carlos Brathwaite 34 (19); Matiullah Khan 2/27 (2 overs)		Rassie van der Dussen 51 (26); Wellington Masakadza 1/11 (2 overs)

NYS Lagos won by 7 wickets
Harare Sports Club, Harare
Player of the match: Rassie van der Dussen (NYS Lagos)

- NYS Lagos won the toss and elected to field.

Match 4
22 September 2024
15:00
Scorecard

Harare Bolts; 99/3 (10 overs)	v	Durban Wolves; 101/3 (9.2 overs)
George Munsey 37 (18); Dawlat Zadran 2/12 (2 overs)		Colin Munro 58* (29); Aftab Alam 1/7 (1.2 overs)

Durban Wolves won by 7 wickets
Harare Sports Club, Harare
Player of the match: Colin Munro (Durban Wolves)

- Durban Wolves won the toss and elected to field.

Match 5
22 September 2024
17:15 (D/N)
Scorecard

NYS Lagos; 133/2 (10 overs)	v	Joburg Bangla Tigers; 117/7 (10 overs)
Rassie van der Dussen 81* (32); Karim Janat 2/14 (2 overs)		Tashinga Musekiwa 21* (8); Akhilesh Bodugum 3/19 (2 overs)

NYS Lagos won by 16 runs
Harare Sports Club, Harare
Player of the match: Rassie van der Dussen (NYS Lagos)

- Joburg Bangla Tigers won the toss and elected to field.

Match 6
22 September 2024
19:30 (N)
Scorecard

Bulawayo Brave Jaguars; 83/6 (10 overs)	v	Cape Town Samp Army; 87/7 (8.4 overs)
Kobe Herft 38 (27); David Willey 3/13 (2 overs)		Brian Bennett 20 (12); Wesley Madhevere 3/17 (2 overs)

Cape Town Samp Army won by 3 wickets
Harare Sports Club, Harare
Player of the match: David Willey (Cape Town Samp Army)

- Cape Town Samp Army won the toss and elected to field.

Match 7
23 September 2024
15:00
Scorecard

Joburg Bangla Tigers; 90 (9.4 overs)	v	Harare Bolts; 92/6 (9.4 overs)
Sikandar Raza 20 (8); James Neesham 3/14 (2 overs)		Dasun Shanaka 50* (21); Karim Janat 2/15 (2 overs)

Harare Bolts won by 4 wickets
Harare Sports Club, Harare
Player of the match: Dasun Shanaka (Harare Bolts)

- Harare Bolts won the toss and elected to field.

Match 8
23 September 2024
17:15 (D/N)
Scorecard

Durban Wolves; 112/2 (10 overs)	v	Bulawayo Brave Jaguars; 116/6 (9.3 overs)
Will Smeed 55* (25); Richard Ngarava 1/15 (2 overs)		Nick Hobson 38* (13); Muhammad Rohid Khan 2/17 (2 overs)

Bulawayo Brave Jaguars won by 4 wickets
Harare Sports Club, Harare
Player of the match: Nick Hobson (Bulawayo Brave Jaguars)

- Durban Wolves won the toss and elected to bat.

Match 9
23 September 2024
19:30 (N)
Scorecard

Cape Town Samp Army; 151/4 (10 overs)	v	NYS Lagos; 129/5 (10 overs)
Dawid Malan 63 (25); Binura Fernando 1/29 (2 overs)		Thisara Perera 48 (17); Amir Hamza 2/27 (2 overs)

Cape Town Samp Army won by 22 runs
Harare Sports Club, Harare
Player of the match: Dawid Malan (Cape Town Samp Army)

- NYS Lagos won the toss and elected to field.

Match 10
24 September 2024
15:00
Scorecard

NYS Lagos; 134/5 (10 overs)	v	Durban Wolves; 124/5 (10 overs)
Najibullah Zadran 43 (17); Muhammad Rohid Khan 2/13 (2 overs)		Sharjeel Khan 59 (30); Thisara Perera 2/17 (2 overs)

NYS Lagos won by 10 runs
Harare Sports Club, Harare
Player of the match: Najibullah Zadran (NYS Lagos)

- Durban Wolves won the toss and elected to field.

Match 11
24 September 2024
17:15 (D/N)
Scorecard

Bulawayo Brave Jaguars; 96/8 (10 overs)	v	Harare Bolts; 102/3 (7.4 overs)
Nick Hobson 35 (17); Shehan Jayasuriya 2/6 (1 over)		Dasun Shanaka 47* (18); Daryn Dupavillon 2/7 (1 over)

Harare Bolts won by 7 wickets
Harare Sports Club, Harare
Player of the match: Shehan Jayasuriya (Harare Bolts)

- Harare Bolts won the toss and elected to field.

Match 12
24 September 2024
19:30 (N)
Scorecard

Cape Town Samp Army; 82/7 (10 overs)	v	Joburg Bangla Tigers; 84/5 (8.4 overs)
Rohan Mustafa 28 (20); Sikandar Raza 3/9 (2 overs)		Sikandar Raza 62* (30); David Willey 2/9 (2 overs)

Joburg Bangla Tigers won by 5 wickets
Harare Sports Club, Harare
Player of the match: Sikandar Raza (Joburg Bangla Tigers)

- Cape Town Samp Army won the toss and elected to bat.

Match 13
25 September 2024
15:00
Scorecard

Harare Bolts; 117/7 (10 overs)	v	NYS Lagos; 73 (10 overs)
Dasun Shanaka 31 (10); Oshane Thomas 2/16 (2 overs)		Rassie van der Dussen 25 (16); Richard Gleeson 2/1 (1 over)

Harare Bolts won by 44 runs
Harare Sports Club, Harare
Player of the match: Brandon Mavuta (Harare Bolts)

- NYS Lagos won the toss and elected to field.

Match 14
25 September 2024
17:15 (D/N)
Scorecard

Cape Town Samp Army; 138/5 (10 overs)	v	Durban Wolves; 110/8 (10 overs)
Brian Bennett 47 (20); Yasir Shah 2/21 (2 overs)		Colin Munro 55 (24); Salman Irshad 4/13 (2 overs)

Cape Town Samp Army won by 28 runs
Harare Sports Club, Harare
Player of the match: Salman Irshad (Cape Town Samp Army)

- Durban Wolves won the toss and elected to field.

Match 15
25 September 2024
19:30 (N)
Scorecard

Bulawayo Brave Jaguars; 110/5 (10 overs)	v	Joburg Bangla Tigers; 112/6 (9.5 overs)
Anamul Haque 24 (16); George Linde 2/12 (1 over)		George Linde 31 (16); Wellington Masakadza 2/25 (2 overs)

Joburg Bangla Tigers won by 4 wickets
Harare Sports Club, Harare
Player of the match: Karim Janat (Joburg Bangla Tigers)

- Joburg Bangla Tigers won the toss and elected to field.

Match 16
26 September 2024
15:00
Scorecard

Harare Bolts; 173/2 (10 overs)	v	Durban Wolves; 119/6 (10 overs)
George Munsey 100* (38); Dawlat Zadran 2/36 (2 overs)		Colin Munro 32 (13); Richard Gleeson 2/2 (1 over)

Harare Bolts won by 54 runs
Harare Sports Club, Harare
Player of the match: George Munsey (Harare Bolts)

- Durban Wolves won the toss and elected to field.

Match 17
26 September 2024
17:15 (D/N)
Scorecard

Joburg Bangla Tigers; 128/2 (10 overs)	v	Bulawayo Brave Jaguars; 91/9 (10 overs)
Sikandar Raza 51* (21); Wellington Masakadza 1/23 (2 overs)		Carlos Brathwaite 18 (10); George Linde 3/9 (2 overs)

Joburg Bangla Tigers won by 37 runs
Harare Sports Club, Harare
Player of the match: Sikandar Raza (Joburg Bangla Tigers)

- Joburg Bangla Tigers won the toss and elected to bat.

Match 18
26 September 2024
19:30 (N)
Scorecard

NYS Lagos; 148/2 (10 overs)	v	Cape Town Samp Army; 106/3 (10 overs)
Avishka Fernando 66 (27); Salman Irshad 2/21 (2 overs)		Brian Bennett 40* (28); Oshane Thomas 2/27 (2 overs)

NYS Lagos won by 42 runs
Harare Sports Club, Harare
Player of the match: Avishka Fernando (NYS Lagos)

- NYS Lagos won the toss and elected to bat.

Match 19
27 September 2024
15:00
Scorecard

Bulawayo Brave Jaguars; 103/7 (10 overs)	v	Cape Town Samp Army; 104/2 (8.3 overs)
David Warner 47 (26); Salman Irshad 2/15 (2 overs)		Dawid Malan 48* (23); Victor Chirwa 1/9 (1 over)

Cape Town Samp Army won by 8 wickets
Harare Sports Club, Harare
Player of the match: Dawid Malan (Cape Town Samp Army)

- Bulawayo Brave Jaguars won the toss and elected to bat.

Match 20
27 September 2024
17:15 (D/N)
Scorecard

NYS Lagos; 124/7 (10 overs)	v	Durban Wolves; 71/7 (10 overs)
Avishka Fernando 46 (19); Raveen de Silva 2/22 (2 overs)		Innocent Kaia 19* (14); Joshua Bishop 2/10 (2 overs); Akhilesh Bodugum 2/10 (2 overs)

NYS Lagos won by 53 runs
Harare Sports Club, Harare
Player of the match: Avishka Fernando (NYS Lagos)

Match 21
27 September 2024
19:30 (N)
Scorecard

Harare Bolts; 120/4 (10 overs)	v	Joburg Bangla Tigers; 121/6 (10 overs)
Sabbir Rahman 34* (12); Luke Wood 2/7 (2 overs)		Sikandar Raza 38 (10); Michael Palmer 1/5 (1 over)

Joburg Bangla Tigers won by 4 wickets
Harare Sports Club, Harare
Player of the match: Sikandar Raza (Joburg Bangla Tigers)

- Joburg Bangla Tigers won the toss and elected to field.

== Play-offs ==
Qualifier 1
28 September 2024 — Harare
1	Harare Bolts	124/2 (10 overs)
2	Joburg Bangla Tigers	125/3 (9 overs)
Eliminator
28 September 2024 — Harare
3	NYS Lagos	88/8 (10 overs)
4	Cape Town Samp Army	93/2 (6.3 overs)

Qualifier 2
28 September 2024 — Harare
Q1L	Harare Bolts	98/6 (10 overs)
EW	Cape Town Samp Army	99/1 (7.2 overs)

The Final
29 September 2024 — Harare
Q1W	Joburg Bangla Tigers	129/5 (10 overs)
Q2W	Cape Town Samp Army	124/2 (10 overs)

Qualifier 1
28 September 2024
15:00
Scorecard

Harare Bolts; 124/2 (10 overs)	v	Joburg Bangla Tigers; 125/3 (9 overs)
Dasun Shanaka 61* (24); George Linde 1/16 (1 over)		Mohammad Shahzad 64 (25); Arinesto Vezha 1/11 (1 over)

Joburg Bangla Tigers won by 7 wickets
Harare Sports Club, Harare
Umpires: Iknow Chabi and David Shawane
Player of the match: Mohammad Shahzad (Joburg Bangla Tigers)

- Joburg Bangla Tigers won the toss and elected to field.

Eliminator
28 September 2024
17:15 (D/N)
Scorecard

NYS Lagos; 88/8 (10 overs)	v	Cape Town Samp Army; 93/2 (6.3 overs)
Blessing Muzarabani 27 (15); Salman Irshad 3/11 (2 overs)		Rohan Mustafa 60* (23); Binura Fernando 2/23 (2 overs)

Cape Town Samp Army won by 8 wickets
Harare Sports Club, Harare
Umpires: Tafadzwa Musakwa and Forster Mutizwa
Player of the match: Salman Irshad (Cape Town Samp Army)

- Cape Town Samp Army won the toss and elected to field.

Qualifier 2
28 September 2024
19:30 (N)
Scorecard

Harare Bolts; 98/6 (10 overs)	v	Cape Town Samp Army; 99/1 (7.2 overs)
Shehan Jayasuriya 39 (19); Amir Hamza 3/9 (2 overs)		Brian Bennett 46 (18); Brandon Mavuta 1/23 (2 overs)

Cape Town Samp Army won by 9 wickets
Harare Sports Club, Harare
Player of the match: Amir Hamza (Cape Town Samp Army)

- Cape Town Samp Army won the toss and elected to field.

=== The Final ===
The Final
29 September 2024
17:30 (D/N)
Scorecard

Joburg Bangla Tigers; 129/5 (10 overs)	v	Cape Town Samp Army; 124/2 (10 overs)
Mohammad Shahzad 44 (25); Nicholson Gordon 2/10 (1 over)		Dawid Malan 62* (28); Adam Milne 2/18 (2 overs)

Joburg Bangla Tigers won by 5 runs
Harare Sports Club, Harare
Umpires: Iknow Chabi and Forster Mutizwa
Player of the match: Mohammad Shahzad (Joburg Bangla Tigers)

- Cape Town Samp Army won the toss and elected to field.

== Statistics ==
Most runs
Player	Team	Runs
Rassie van der Dussen	NYS Lagos	256
Dawid Malan	Cape Town Samp Army	252
George Munsey	Harare Bolts	246
Brian Bennett	Cape Town Samp Army	234
Sikandar Raza	Joburg Bangla Tigers	231

- Source: Cricbuzz

Most wickets
Player	Team	Wickets	Best bowling
Richard Gleeson	Harare Bolts	12	3/8
Amir Hamza	Cape Town Samp Army	12	3/9
Salman Irshad	Cape Town Samp Army	11	4/13
Rohan Mustafa	Cape Town Samp Army	9	2/11
Dawlat Zadran	Durban Wolves	9	2/12

- Source: Cricbuzz
