= South Africa A cricket team in Zimbabwe in 2021 =

International cricket tour

	Zimbabwe A	South Africa A
- Dates: 29 May – 16 June 2021
Captains	Tendai Chatara (List A) (Note: Chamu Chibhabha captained Zimbabwe A for the last List A match.); Richmond Mutumbami (First-class) (Note: Timycen Maruma captained Zimbabwe A for the second first-class match.)	Zubayr Hamza

FC series
- Result: South Africa A won the 2-match series 1–0
Most runs	Milton Shumba (74)	Zubayr Hamza (229)
Most wickets	Wesley Madhevere (4)	Daryn Dupavillon (8)

LA series
- Result: South Africa A won the 4-match series 3–1
Most runs	Dion Myers (170)	Ryan Rickelton (224)
Most wickets	Tapiwa Mufudza (5)	Senuran Muthusamy (9)

The South Africa A cricket team toured Zimbabwe in May and June 2021 to play four unofficial One Day International matches (with List A status) and two unofficial Test matches (with first-class status) against the Zimbabwe A cricket team. The fixtures for the tour were confirmed by Zimbabwe Cricket on 17 May 2021, with all of the matches having played in Harare. Zimbabwe Cricket's official YouTube channel streamed all the matches live.

== Background ==
On 18 May 2021, Zimbabwe Cricket announced 16-man squads for both the unofficial ODI and Test series, with Tendai Chatara named as the captain for the List A series, while Richmond Mutumbami as the captain for the first-class format. On the same day, Cricket South Africa also named 16 man-squads for the tour, with Zubayr Hamza named as the captain for both formats.

This tour was Zimbabwe A's first since 2017, while the tour was also the first bilateral series for South Africa A since the COVID-19 pandemic struck. The Zimbabwe Cricket's Director of Cricket Hamilton Masakadza stated, "The importance of the Zimbabwe A team cannot be overemphasised and, needless to say, we couldn’t be happier to have the boys finally back in action." He added, "Playing regularly at this level will help our players bridge the gap between domestic cricket and the international game. We are grateful to Cricket South Africa for accepting our invitation and we are looking forward to an exciting, competitive series between the two sides."

The unofficial ODI series were used by South Africa as the preparation for their away series against the West Indies in June 2021. Cricket South Africa's convenor of selectors Victor Mpitsang said, "We are pleased to have our ‘A’ team playing again. This is vital for the growth of our next tier of players who have been starved of international experience of late." Mpitsang added, "The one-day series in particular will act as match preparation for our Proteas who will be taking part in the white-ball leg of the tour to the West Indies."

The second unofficial Test match was suspended due to the COVID-19 restrictions set by the Zimbabwean government. Zimbabwe's Sports and Recreation Commission (SRC) instructed an end to all sporting activities from 14 June 2021. In response, Zimbabwe Cricket agreed to put a stop to all cricket activities but would appeal the government for the fixture to be completed in a bio-secure environment and to permit the national men's team to continue preparations for the home series against Bangladesh and the tour of Ireland in August.

== Squads ==
First-class		List A	
Zimbabwe A	South Africa A	Zimbabwe A	South Africa A
Tendai Chatara (c); Faraz Akram; Ryan Burl; Brighton Chipungu; Tanaka Chivanga; Brad Evans; Joylord Gumbie; Roy Kaia; Takudzwanashe Kaitano; Wesley Madhevere; Brian Mudzinganyama; Tapiwa Mufudza; Carl Mumba; Tarisai Musakanda; Richmond Mutumbami; Milton Shumba	Zubayr Hamza (c); Dominic Hendricks; Edward Moore; Raynard van Tonder; Theunis de Bruyn; Senuran Muthusamy; Sinethemba Qeshile; Migael Pretorius; Daryn Dupavillon; Glenton Stuurman; Lutho Sipamla; Dayyaan Galiem; Okuhle Cele; Tony de Zorzi; Ryan Rickelton; Tshepo Ntuli	Richmond Mutumbami (c); Faraz Akram; Ryan Burl; Tendai Chatara; Tanaka Chivanga; Brad Evans; Roy Kaia; Tapiwa Mufudza; Brian Chari; Chamu Chibhabha; Luke Jongwe; Timycen Maruma; Tadiwanashe Marumani; Dion Myers; Ainsley Ndlovu; Victor Nyauchi	Zubayr Hamza (c); Ryan Rickelton; Janneman Malan; Reeza Hendricks; Tony de Zorzi; Dwaine Pretorius; Andile Phehlukwayo; Sisanda Magala; Junior Dala; Lutho Sipamla; Senuran Muthusamy; Daryn Dupavillon; Glenton Stuurman; Theunis de Bruyn; Wiaan Lubbe; Sinethemba Qeshile

== Series summary ==
South Africa A won the inaugural match of the bilateral List A series by 6 wickets while chasing the target of 320. An unbeaten century by Theunis de Bruyn helped South Africa A make a strong start to their tour of Zimbabwe as they comfortably beat their hosts by six wickets. Bruyn smashed 113 runs off just 64 balls which led the visitors to conquer the match despite being punished from Tadiwanashe Marumani's 82 off 73 and Dion Myers's 96 off 91 balls. While in the second match, despite another fighting innings from Dion Myers, who scored 70 in excellent style, Zimbabwe A went down to another heavy defeat, by 184 runs, at the hands of South Africa A at Harare Sports Club. Ryan Rickelton starred in South Africa's massive victory as he scored his career-best knock of 169 runs. Captain Zubayr Hamza, batting way down at eight, provided handy contributions in the tail end from South Africa when he struck an unbeaten 37 off 17 balls to lift them to a 366 target.

In the third rain-affected List A match, Chamu Chibhabha and Milton Shumba's magnificent unbroken fifth-wicket partnership of 124 earned Zimbabwe A a fine victory over South Africa A by 22 runs according to the Duckworth–Lewis–Stern method. This victory kept Zimbabwe A alive in the series despite losing early four wickets within 46 runs. Chamu Chibhabha's 85 runs off 103 balls, Milton Shumba's 50 runs off 98 balls, and consistent bowling figures of all Zimbabwean bowlers starred in this victory, as South Africa A were losing wickets regularly in the batting innings. In the final List A match, the batting unit of Zimbabwe A again suffered as the visitors seal the one-day series winning the match by 116 runs. Reeza Hendricks slammed 89 runs off 105 balls and Theunis de Bruyn handily contributed in the late overs, which led South Africa A to secure 281 runs in 50 overs. The economic bowling figures of all South African bowlers, with Senuran Muthusamy as the best bower, who bagged 4 wickets for 36 runs as Zimbabwe A were restricted to 165 runs, with more than 11 overs to spare.

== List A series ==
=== 1st Unofficial ODI ===
29 May 2021
09:30
Scorecard

Zimbabwe A 319/9 (50 overs)	v	South Africa A 320/4 (42.5 overs)
Dion Myers 96 (91); Dwaine Pretorius 3/39 (8 overs)		Theunis de Bruyn 113* (64); Luke Jongwe 2/58 (7 overs)

South Africa A won by 6 wickets
Harare Sports Club, Harare
Umpires: Iknow Chabi (Zim) and Langton Rusere (Zim)

- South Africa A won the toss and elected to field.
- Tanaka Chivanga (ZIM A) made his List A debut.

=== 2nd Unofficial ODI ===
31 May 2021
09:30
Scorecard

South Africa A 365/6 (50 overs)	v	Zimbabwe A 181 (35.3 overs)
Ryan Rickelton 169 (150); Luke Jongwe 2/65 (7 overs)		Dion Myers 70 (63); Senuran Muthusamy 4/37 (8.3 overs)

South Africa A won by 184 runs
Harare Sports Club, Harare
Umpires: Christopher Phiri (Zim) and Iknow Chabi (Zim)

- Zimbabwe A won the toss and elected to field.

=== 3rd Unofficial ODI ===
2 June 2021
09:30
Scorecard

South Africa A 226/9 (50 overs)	v	Zimbabwe A 170/4 (37 overs)
Tony de Zorzi 60 (82); Dion Myers 3/18 (6 overs)		Chamu Chibhabha 85 (103); Lutho Sipamla 2/31 (7 overs)

Zimbabwe A won by 22 runs (DLS method)
Harare Sports Club, Harare
Umpires: Christopher Phiri (Zim) and Forster Mutizwa

- South Africa A won the toss and elected to bat.
- Zimbabwe A were set a revised target of 149 runs from 37 overs due to rain.

=== 4th Unofficial ODI ===
4 June 2021
09:30
Scorecard

South Africa A 281/6 (50 overs)	v	Zimbabwe A 165 (38.2 overs)
Reeza Hendricks 89 (105); Luke Jongwe 3/47 (10 overs)		Milton Shumba 35 (55); Senuran Muthusamy 4/36 (8.2 overs)

South Africa A won by 116 runs
Harare Sports Club, Harare
Umpires: Forster Mutizwa (Zim) and Langton Rusere (Zim)

- Zimbabwe A won the toss and elected to field.

== First-class series ==
=== 1st Unofficial Test ===
07–10 June 2021
Scorecard

Zimbabwe A	v	South Africa A
344 (105.4 overs); Milton Shumba 74 (247); Daryn Dupavillon 5/69 (21.4 overs)		603/4d (135 overs); Zubayr Hamza 222* (239); Roy Kaia 3/98 (27 overs)
93 (45.3 overs); Timycen Maruma 33 (99); Glenton Stuurman 3/18 (10.3 overs)

South Africa A won by an innings and 166 runs
Harare Sports Club, Harare
Umpires: Forster Mutizwa and Iknow Chabi

- Zimbabwe A won the toss and elected to bat.
- Tanaka Chivanga replaced Dion Myers (Zim) as concussion substitute during South Africa A first innings.
- Timycen Maruma replaced Milton Shumba (Zim) as concussion substitute during Zimbabwe A second innings.

=== 2nd Unofficial Test ===
13–16 June 2021
Scorecard

South Africa A	v	Zimbabwe A
282 (88.5 overs); Ryan Rickelton 92 (157); Wesley Madhevere 5/49 (23 overs)

Match drawn
Harare Sports Club, Harare
Umpires: Christopher Phiri and Langton Rusere

- Zimbabwe A won the toss and elected to field.
- No play was possible on Day 2 and the match was suspended due to the COVID-19 restrictions.
