= Pakistan A cricket team in Zimbabwe in 2023 =

International cricket tour

Pakistani A cricket team in Zimbabwe in 2023
	Zimbabwe A	Pakistan A
- Dates: 3 – 27 May 2023
Captains	Faraz Akram	Imran Butt

FC series
- Result: Pakistan A won the 2-match series 2–0
Most runs	Joylord Gumbie (165)	Omair Yousuf (348)
Most wickets	Victor Nyauchi (6)	Mehran Mumtaz (15)

LA series
- Result: Zimbabwe A won the 6-match series 4–2
Most runs	Craig Ervine (416)	Omair Yousuf (275)
Most wickets	Tendai Chatara (10)	Aamer Jamal (16)
- Player of the series: Craig Ervine (Zimbabwe Select)

The Pakistan A cricket team toured Zimbabwe in May 2023 to play two first-class matches against the Zimbabwe A cricket team and six List A matches against the Zimbabwe national cricket team. In April 2023, Zimbabwe Cricket (ZC) confirmed the fixtures for the tour, with the matches taking place at Kwekwe, Mutare and Harare. The limited overs matches were used by Zimbabwe as preparation ahead of the 2023 Cricket World Cup Qualifier. The first-class series was won by the Pakistan A side 2-0, while the unofficial one-day series was won by Zimbabwe Select 4-2.

In a historic milestone for Zimbabwe Cricket, this series marked the first instance where a non-international cricket series was televised. The rights to broadcast the games were successfully sold in Pakistan and India, providing viewers in those regions the opportunity to watch the matches. Meanwhile, the rest of the world had free live coverage of the games on Facebook.

== Squads ==
First-class		List A	
Zimbabwe A	Pakistan A	Zimbabwe A	Pakistan A
Faraz Akram (c); Roy Kaia; Victor Nyauchi; Nyasha Mayavo; Luke Jongwe; Joylord Gumbie (wk); Brad Evans; Brandon Mavuta; Wesley Madhevere; Tadiwanashe Marumani; Dion Myers; Milton Shumba; Tanaka Chivanga; Johnathan Campbell; Tanunurwa Makoni; Tony Munyonga	Imran Butt (c); Hussain Talat (vc); Saim Ayub; Aamer Jamal; Abdul Bangalzai; Haseebullah Khan; Kamran Ghulam; Mehran Mumtaz; Mir Hamza; Mohammad Huraira; Mubasir Khan; ~~Muhammad Umar~~; Omair Yousuf; Qasim Akram; Rohail Nazir (wk); ~~Sahibzada Farhan~~; Shahnawaz Dahani	Ryan Burl; Tendai Chatara; Craig Ervine (c); Brad Evans; Innocent Kaia; Clive Madande (wk); Wessly Madhevere; Tadiwanashe Marumani; Wellington Masakadza; Brandon Mavuta; Blessing Muzarabani; Richard Ngarava; Milton Shumba; Sean Williams; Sikandar Raza	Imran Butt (c); Hussain Talat (vc); Saim Ayub; Aamer Jamal; Abdul Bangalzai; Haseebullah Khan; Kamran Ghulam; Mehran Mumtaz; Mir Hamza; Mohammad Huraira; Mubasir Khan; ~~Muhammad Umar~~; Omair Yousuf; Qasim Akram; Rohail Nazir (wk); ~~Sahibzada Farhan~~; Shahnawaz Dahani

On 13 April 2023, Muhammad Umar was ruled out of Pakistan A's squad due to a knee injury and was replaced by Mohammad Ali. On 27 April 2023, Sahibzada Farhan was ruled out of the tour due to a right thumb injury and was replaced by Saim Ayub.

== First-class series ==
=== 1st Unofficial Test ===
3–6 May 2023
Scorecard

Pakistan Shaheens	v	Zimbabwe A
521/3d (115.3 overs); Omair Yousuf 250* (342); Tanaka Chivanga 1/67 (14.3 overs)		225 (76.3 overs); Dion Myers 56 (92); Mehran Mumtaz 5/47 (17.3 overs)
111/2 (18.2 overs); Imran Butt 62 (54); Brandon Mavuta 1/28 (5.2 overs)		410 (104.4 overs)(f/o); Joylord Gumbie 115 (202); Mehran Mumtaz 6/110 (33.4 overs)

Pakistan Shaheens won by 8 wickets.
Kwekwe Sports Club, Kwekwe
Umpires: Christopher Phiri (Zim) and Iknow Chabi (Zim)

- Zimbabwe A won the toss and elected to field.

=== 2nd Unofficial Test ===
10–13 May 2023
Scorecard

Zimbabwe A	v	Pakistan Shaheens
163 (56.4 Overs); Tadiwanashe Marumani 66 (100); Mohammad Ali 4/36 (14.4 Overs)		479 (116 Overs); Haseebullah Khan 117 (214); Victor Nyauchi 5/125 (26 Overs)
275 (85.3 overs); Nyasha Mayavo 55 (108); Mohammad Ali 3/49 (18 overs)

Pakistan Shaheens won by an innings and 41 runs.
Mutare Sports Club, Mutare
Umpires: Forster Mutizwa (Zim) and Iknow Chabi (Zim)

- Pakistan Shaheens won the toss and elected to field.

== List A series ==
=== 1st Unofficial ODI ===
17 May 2023
09:15
Scorecard

Zimbabwe Select; 234 (45.3 overs)	v	Pakistan Shaheens; 210 (47 overs)
Ryan Burl 69 (68); Aamer Jamal 4/35 (8 overs)		Mubasir Khan 49 (68); Tendai Chatara 5/37 (9 overs)

Zimbabwe Select won by 24 runs
Harare Sports Club, Harare
Umpires: Ashby Mutumbami (Zim) and Christopher Phiri (Zim)
Player of the match: Tendai Chatara (Zimbabwe Select)

- Pakistan Shaheens won the toss and elected to field.

In preparation for the 2023 Cricket World Cup Qualifier, the Zimbabwe Select deployed almost everyone from their full roster. However, a strong start by the Shaheens' bowlers led to the dismissal of half the top order, leaving Zimbabwe Select at 64-5. Aamer Jamal emerged as a standout performer in the bowling attack, making a significant impact by capturing three crucial wickets, effectively disrupting the hosts' innings. Ryan Burl, and Clive Madande then stepped in at number 6 and 7, forming a resilient partnership that added 90 runs to the scoreboard. As a result, the Zimbabwe Select team managed to set a more defendable target of 234 runs.

Despite the Shaheens' stronger position going into the second innings, their top order encountered a similar fate and succumbed to the bowling of Tendai Chatara during the powerplay. This restricted the Shaheens' score to 105-5. Haseebullah Khan and Mubasir Khan displayed stability as they batted at positions 6 and 7, bringing the Shaheens closer to victory. However, neither batsman was able to achieve a half-century milestone. Chatara, continuing his exceptional bowling spell, claimed two more wickets from the lower order, ultimately ending the Shaheens' innings at 210. His outstanding performance earned him a five-wicket haul and the well-deserved title of Player of the Match.

=== 2nd Unofficial ODI ===
19 May 2023
09:15
Scorecard

Zimbabwe Select; 236 (38.5 overs)	v	Pakistan Shaheens; 156 (37.3 overs)
Blessing Muzarabani 50 (24); Aamer Jamal 5/75 (10 overs)		Imran Butt 45 (81); Blessing Muzarabani 4/22 (6.3 overs)

Zimbabwe Select won by 80 runs.
Harare Sports Club, Harare
Umpires: David Shawane (Zim) and Forster Mutizwa
Player of the match: Blessing Muzarabani (Zimbabwe Select)

- Pakistan Shaheens won the toss and elected to field.

Both teams maintained the same roster as the first game, with one change for the Zimbabwe Select team, substituting Brad Evans with Victor Nyauchi. The Zimbabwe side batted first once again, and they encountered a similar start to their previous game as the top order crumbled within the first 13 overs, leaving the team at 57-5. Ryan Burl and Clive Madande once again formed a resilient partnership, contributing 47 and 43 runs respectively, elevating the team's total to 145. Notably, the highest-scoring batsman for the Zimbabwe Select team was Blessing Muzarabani, who remarkably achieved his first List-A half-century in just 24 deliveries while batting at number 11. The Zimbabwe innings concluded when Tendai Chatara was caught out, but the bowling duo managed to surpass their previous game's total by 2 runs. In a repeat of his stellar performance, Aamer Jamal once again shone for the Shaheens, claiming a five-wicket haul and solidifying his status as the star performer of the match.

Although the Shaheens had a stronger start, they too experienced a setback by losing five wickets consecutively, resulting in the team's score at 5-71. However, opening batsman and captain Imran Butt showcased resilience against the Zimbabwe Select bowling attack, contributing 45 runs before being dismissed through an lbw decision. Following the captain's departure, the Shaheens' lower order struggled, eventually being bowled out for 156. Undoubtedly, Blessing Muzarabani's outstanding performance, featuring a half-century with the bat and a four-wicket haul with the ball, played a pivotal role in guiding the team to victory. His exceptional contributions earned him the well-deserved title of Player of the Match.

=== 3rd Unofficial ODI ===
21 May 2023
09:15
Scorecard

Zimbabwe Select; 278 (50 overs)	v	Pakistan Shaheens; 263/8 (46.5)
Sean Williams 78 (59); Shahnawaz Dahani 4/43 (10 overs)		Qasim Akram 57 (40); Tendai Chatara 4/53 (9.5 overs)

Pakistan Shaheens won by 5 runs (DLS method)
Harare Sports Club, Harare
Umpires: Iknow Chabi (Zim) and Tafadzwa Musakwa (Zim)
Player of the match: Qasim Akram (Pakistan Shaheens)

- Pakistan Shaheens won the toss and elected to field.
- Tanaka Chivanga is substitute by Victor Nyauchi (Zimbabwe Select) in 2nd inning at 0.1 overs.
- Bad light stopped play at 46.5 overs in the Pakistan Shaheens innings, play was abandoned.

Both teams made changes to their squads for the match. Zimbabwe Select brought in Joylord Gumbie, Faraz Akram, and Chivanga Tanaka to replace Innocent Kaia, Blessing Muzarabani, and Victor Nyauchi. On the other hand, the Shaheens had Mir Hamza and Imran Butt sit out, while Omair Yousuf and Qasim Akram replaced them. Additionally, Hussain Talat assumed the captaincy from Imran Butt. Although Joylord Gumbie of Zimbabwe Select fell early, the top order performed well, particularly Sean Williams, who scored 78 runs off 59 balls, helping the team reach a total of 278. This was the highest score achieved by Zimbabwe Select in the series.

The Shaheens displayed consistent performance throughout the game, even as they lost wickets at regular intervals. Despite this, they managed to maintain the required run rate. Charata continued to impress with his bowling, and at 169-6, the Shaheens showed resilience. Qasim Akram, batting at number eight, provided much-needed stability and turned the tables on Zimbabwe's bowlers. He played a crucial role in leading the team to victory and also achieved the first half-century for their side. While the Shaheens seemed poised for a comfortable win within the required overs, the game was cut short due to bad light. The par score was 258, and the Shaheens were declared the winners based on the DLS (Duckworth-Lewis-Stern) method.

=== 4th Unofficial ODI ===
23 May 2023
09:15
Scorecard

Pakistan Shaheens; 295/9 (50 overs)	v	Zimbabwe Select; 299/3 (47.3 overs)
Omair Yousuf 153 (126); Brad Evans 5/62 (10 overs)		Craig Ervine 161 (144); Shahnawaz Dahani 2/60 (9.3 overs)

Zimbabwe Select won by 7 wickets
Harare Sports Club, Harare
Umpires: Langton Rusere (Zim) and Percival Sizara (Zim)
Player of the match: Craig Ervine (Zimbabwe Select)

- Zimbabwe Select won the toss and elected to field.

The Zimbabwe Select team continued their squad experimentation, ensuring that everyone got a chance to play. Notably, Milton Shumba substituted for Sean Williams, who potentially injured his finger in the previous game. On the Shaheens side, the only change from the last game was Abdul Bangalzai replacing Saim Ayub. During the toss, the Zimbabwe Select won and elected to bat second for the first time in the series. The Shaheens' batting lineup encountered difficulties, but Omair Yousuf's remarkable 159 and Kamran Ghulam's 55 helped them achieve their highest total so far, reaching 295. Despite missing Chatara in the bowling department, the Zimbabwe Select struggled to make progress due to several misfields and dropped catches by the fielding side. Despite this they bowling attack took 9 wickets and Brad Evans, who had been rested for the last two games, managed to claim a five-wicket haul.

The Shaheens began the match on a high note, quickly dismissing Tadiwanashe Marumani in the early overs. However, after the first wicket fell, they struggled to maintain their momentum. Joylord Gumbie and Craig Ervine, though starting slowly, managed to steady the innings and eventually surpassed the century mark. Their partnership was broken when the Zimbabwe side had reached 285 runs, but by then, the damage had been done. Craig Ervine's exceptional knock of 161 off 144 deliveries earned him the well-deserved player of the match award.

=== 5th Unofficial ODI ===
25 May 2023
09:15
Scorecard

Pakistan Shaheens; 314/6 (50 overs)	v	Zimbabwe Select; 137 (31.4 overs)
Omair Yousuf 89* (87); Brandon Mavuta 2/39 (8 overs)		Clive Madande 41 (46); Qasim Akram 3/9 (3.4 overs)

Pakistan Shaheens won by 177 runs.
Harare Sports Club, Harare
Umpires: Forster Mutizwa (Zim) and Stanley Gogwe (Zim)
Player of the match: Omair Yousuf (Pakistan Shaheens)

- Zimbabwe select won the toss and elected to field.

The Zimbabwe select side opted to rest several key players ahead of the game, while Sikander Raza made a return to the squad following a successful stint in the IPL. Sean Williams, who had recovered from a finger injury, assumed the captaincy of the new team. On the Shaheens side, Imran Butt returned to open the innings, while Hussein Talat retained his role as captain.In the match, the Select won the toss and elected to field first. The Shaheens top order displayed resilience and kept the scoreboard ticking. Imran Butt, Haseebullah Khan, and the in-form Pakistani batsman Omair Yousuf all contributed with scores surpassing 50 runs, propelling the team to a total of 314 runs at the end of their 50 overs.

On the other hand, the Zimbabwe batting lineup encountered difficulties right from the beginning. Apart from Clive Madande, all the other batsmen struggled to surpass 20 runs, resulting in their team being dismissed for a mere 137 runs in just 32 overs. Shahnawaz Dahani continued his impressive form and claimed early wickets, providing the Shaheens with a breakthrough in the opposition's batting order. With this victory, the Pakistan Shaheens triumphed over the Zimbabwe Select side in the fifth one-day match, keeping their hopes alive in the series.

=== 6th Unofficial ODI ===
27 May 2023
09:15
Scorecard

Zimbabwe Select; 385/7 (50 overs)	v	Pakistan Shaheens; 353 (49.2 overs)
Craig Ervine 195 (148); Mohammad Ali 2/32 (7 overs)		Mubasir Khan 115 (77); Sikandar Raza 3/66 (10 overs)

Zimbabwe Select won by 32 runs
Harare Sports Club, Harare
Umpires: Iknow Chabi (Zim) and Walter Musakwa (Zim)
Player of the match: Craig Ervine (Zimbabwe Select)

- Pakistan Shaheens won the toss and elected to field.
- Pakistan Shaheens were penalized for ball tampering, the Select side was awarded 5 runs.

In the final game of the series, Kamran Ghulam led the Shaheens and won the toss, electing to send the Zimbabwe Select team to bat first. The Shaheens got an early breakthrough when Joylord Gumbie, who had scored a century in the previous game, was dismissed for a duck. However, Innocent Kaia and Craig Ervine formed a strong partnership, accumulating 187 runs in just 27 overs. Craig Ervine showcased his brilliance with a score of 195, while Innocent Kaia contributed 92 runs off 79 deliveries, allowing the lower batting order some leeway. In the last over, Craig Ervine fell short of a double century as he was run out by a direct hit from Haseebullah Khan while attempting to regain strike. The innings ended with the Select side scoring 385, the highest total in series. During the innings, there was a controversy on the field as the Pakistan Shaheens were penalized for ball tampering by umpire Iknow Chaabi. As a result of the infraction, the Select side was awarded 5 runs.

Despite losing some early wickets from the top order, the Shaheens persisted in maintaining a steady run rate while chasing a massive target. Impressive performances by Rohail Nazir, who scored 87 off 91 deliveries, Kamran Ghulam with 56 off 47, and Mubasir Khan's blistering 115 off 77 propelled the Shaheens to a total of 256. However, as the game progressed, the Shaheens found themselves running out of time, and the mounting pressure of an increasing run rate led to errors and poor shot selections. Eventually, the team was bowled out for 353. The Select side emerged victorious by 32 runs, sealing the series with a 4-2 win.
