= 2023 Zim Afro T10 =

1st edition of the Zim Afro T10 League

- Dates: 21 – 29 July 2023
- Administrator: Zimbabwe Cricket
- Cricket format: T10
- Tournament format(s): Round-robin tournament and playoffs
- Champions: Durban Qalandars (1st title)
- Runners-up: Joburg Buffaloes
- Participants: 5
- Matches: 24
- Player of the series: Tim Seifert (Durban Qalandars)
- Most runs: Rahmanullah Gurbaz (Cape Town Samp Army) (282)
- Most wickets: Brad Evans (Durban Qalandars) (14)

The 2023 Zim Afro T10 was the inaugural season of the Zim Afro T10. The tournament was played from 21 to 29 July at the Harare Sports Club. In the final, Durban Qalandars defeated Joburg Buffaloes by eight wickets to win the inaugural title.

== Background ==
The league was founded by Shaji Ul Mulk, the chairman of the Abu Dhabi T10 league. The Zimbabwe edition was announced at the final of the 2022 Abu Dhabi T10 with the inaugural edition expected to take place in 2023.

After the tournament Zimbabwe Cricket and Pakistan Super League Lahore Qalandars signed a memorandum of understanding (MoU) to increase the exchange of talent between the two countries. The agreement includes eight young Zimbabwean cricketers going to Pakistan for a four-month player development program at the franchise's high-performance center in Lahore, starting on 1 September. The Qalandars will reciprocate by sending five Pakistani fast bowlers – with bowling speeds of 140-plus kilometers per hour – to play domestic cricket in Zimbabwe.

== Teams ==
Five teams competed in the first edition of the league:

- Bulawayo Braves
- Cape Town Samp Army
- Durban Qalandars
- Harare Hurricanes
- Joburg Buffaloes

== Squads ==
Players were chosen in a draft which took place on 3 July 2023. Each team had to select a minimum of 16 players for their squad, including a minimum of six Zimbabweans, including one classified as an "emerging player". As part of the pre-draft, each team selected four players for their squads as marquee players.

A total of 700 players from 23 cricket playing countries participated in the draft. Zimbabwean batsman Sean Williams was the first pick.

Bulawayo Braves	Cape Town Samp Army	Durban Qalandars	Harare Hurricanes	Joburg Buffaloes
Sikandar Raza (c); Ashton Turner; Tymal Mills; Ben McDermott; Taskin Ahmed; Thisara Perera; Beau Webster; Patrick Dooley; Kobe Herft; Ryan Burl; Timycen Maruma; Joylord Gumbie; Innocent Kaia; Faraz Akram; Ansh Tandon; Suresh Raina	Parthiv Patel (c); Bhanuka Rajapaksa; Karim Janat; Maheesh Theekshana; Rahmanullah Gurbaz; Sean Williams; Sheldon Cottrell; Chamika Karunaratne; Peter Hatzoglou; Matthew Breetzke; Richard Ngarava; Cephas Zhuwao; Hamilton Masakadza; Tadiwanashe Marumani; Tinashe Kamunhukamwe; Tom Curran; Mohamed Irfan; Stuart Binny; Mujeeb Ur Rahman	Craig Ervine (c); Sisanda Magala; George Linde; Asif Ali; Hazratullah Zazai; Mohammad Amir; Tim Seifert; Hilton Cartwright; Mirza Tahir Baig; Tayyab Abbas; Tendai Chatara; Brad Evans; Clive Madande; Nick Welch; Andre Fletcher; Muhammad Farooq; Daryn Dupavillon; Azmatullah Omarzai	Eoin Morgan (c); Robin Uthappa; Evin Lewis; Shahnawaz Dahani; Mohammad Nabi; Donovan Ferreira; Duan Jansen; Samit Patel; Kevin Koththigoda; Christopher Mpofu; Regis Chakabva; Luke Jongwe; Brandon Mavuta; Tashinga Musekiwa; Irfan Pathan; Khalid Shah; S. Sreesanth; Nanore Burger	Mohammad Hafeez (c); Tom Banton; Mushfiqur Rahim; Yusuf Pathan; Noor Ahmad; Odean Smith; Will Smeed; Ravi Bopara; Usman Shinwari; Delano Potigeter; Junior Dala; Blessing Muzarabani; Wellington Masakadza; Wesley Madhevere; Victor Nyauchi; Milton Shumba; Rahul Chopra

== Points table ==
Pos	Team	Pld	W	L	NR	Pts	NRR	Qualification
1	Durban Qalandars (C)	8	5	3	0	10	0.131	Advanced to Qualifier 1
2	Joburg Buffaloes	8	4	4	0	8	0.748	Advanced to Qualifier 1
3	Cape Town Samp Army	8	4	4	0	8	0.610	Advanced to Eliminator
4	Harare Hurricanes	8	4	4	0	8	−1.148	Advanced to Eliminator
5	Bulawayo Braves	8	3	5	0	6	−0.351	

Source: ESPNcricinfo
(C) Champions

== League stage ==
The full fixtures were confirmed on 10 July 2023.

Match 1
21 July 2023
3:00 PM
Scorecard

Bulawayo Braves; 128/9 (10 overs)	v	Harare Hurricanes; 79/9 (10 overs)
Sikandar Raza 61* (30); Brandon Mavuta 3/25 (2 overs)		Mohammad Nabi 22 (14); Sikandar Raza 3/12 (2 overs)

Bulawayo Braves won by 49 runs
Harare Sports Club, Harare
Umpires: Bismillah Jan Shinwari (Afg) and Ranmore Martinesz (SL)
Player of the match: Sikandar Raza (Bulawayo Braves)

- Harare Hurricanes won the toss and elected to field.
- Match 1 postponed to 21 July, due to delay in installation of floodlights.

Match 2
21 July 2023
5:00 PM (D/N)
Scorecard

Durban Qalandars; 126/3 (10 overs)	v	Cape Town Samp Army; 118/5 (10 overs)
Tim Seifert 49 (22); Tom Curran 1/11 (2 overs)		Parthiv Patel 37* (14); Azmatullah Omarzai 2/14 (2 overs)

Durban Qalandars won by 8 runs
Harare Sports Club, Harare
Umpires: Ruchira Palliyaguruge (SL) and Ranmore Martinesz (SL)
Player of the match: Tim Seifert (Durban Qalandars)

- Durban Qalandars won the toss and elected to bat.

Match 3
21 July 2023
7:00 PM (N)
Scorecard

Joburg Buffaloes; 105/7 (10 overs)	v	Bulawayo Braves; 95/9 (10 overs)
Mushfiqur Rahim 46* (23); Taskin Ahmed 3/11 (2 overs)		Beau Webster 39* (22); Mohammad Hafeez 6/4 (2 overs)

Joburg Buffaloes won by 10 runs
Harare Sports Club, Harare
Umpires: Bismillah Jan Shinwari (Afg) and Forster Mutizwa (Zim)
Player of the match: Mohammad Hafeez (Joburg Buffaloes)

- Bulawayo Braves won the toss and elected to field.

Match 4
22 July 2023
3:00 PM
Scorecard

Cape Town Samp Army; 112/7 (10 overs)	v	Harare Hurricanes; 97/6 (10 overs)
Rahmanullah Gurbaz 25 (15); Mohammad Nabi 2/11 (2 overs)		Robin Uthappa 31 (20); Tom Curran 2/16 (2 overs)

Cape Town Samp Army won by 15 runs
Harare Sports Club, Harare
Umpires: Ruchira Palliyaguruge (SL) and Forster Mutizwa (Zim)
Player of the match: Tom Curran (Cape Town Samp Army)

- Cape Town Samp Army won the toss and elected to bat.

Match 5
22 July 2023
5:00 PM (D/N)
Scorecard

Joburg Buffaloes; 94/4 (10 overs)	v	Durban Qalandars; 97/3 (9.1 overs)
Tom Banton 55* (31); Tendai Chatara 2/14 (2 overs)		Hazratullah Zazai 41* (25); Mohammad Hafeez 2/13 (2 overs)

Durban Qalandars won by 7 wickets
Harare Sports Club, Harare
Umpires: Iknow Chabi (ZIM) and Percival Sizara (ZIM)
Player of the match: Hazratullah Zazai (Durban Qalandars)

- Joburg Buffaloes won the toss and elected to bat

Match 6
22 July 2023
7:00 PM (N)
Scorecard

Bulawayo Braves; 86/6 (10 overs)	v	Cape Town Samp Army; 87/2 (6.5 overs)
Ben McDermott 27 (17); Tom Curran 2/12 (2 overs)		Tadiwanashe Marumani 43* (21); Taskin Ahmed 1/18 (2 overs)

Cape Town Samp Army won by 8 wickets
Harare Sports Club, Harare
Umpires: Collin Tlou (ZIM) and Ruchira Palliyaguruge (SL)
Player of the match: Tadiwanashe Marumani (Cape Town Samp Army)

- Bulawayo Braves won the toss and elected to bat.

Match 7
23 July 2023
3:00 PM
Scorecard

Durban Qalandars; 126/3 (10 overs)	v	Harare Hurricanes; 127/5 (9.4 overs)
Tim Seifert 71* (31); Mohammad Nabi 2/9 (2 overs)		Regis Chakabva 44* (22); Mohammad Amir 2/23 (2 overs)

Harare Hurricanes won by 5 wickets
Harare Sports Club, Harare
Umpires: Bismillah Jan Shinwari (Afg) and Forster Mutizwa (Zim)
Player of the match: Regis Chakabva (Harare Hurricanes)

- Durban Qalandars won the toss and elected to bat.

Match 8
23 July 2023
5:00 PM (D/N)
Scorecard

Joburg Buffaloes; 96/5 (10 overs)	v	Cape Town Samp Army; 97/3 (7.4 overs)
Mohammad Hafeez 23 (17); Karim Janat 2/25 (2 overs)		Tadiwanashe Marumani 54 (24); Noor Ahmad 2/26 (2 overs)

Cape Town Samp Army won by 7 wickets
Harare Sports Club, Harare
Umpires: Iknow Chabi (Zim) and Ranmore Martinesz (SL)
Player of the match: Tadiwanashe Marumani (Cape Town Samp Army)

- Cape Town Samp Army won the toss and elected to field.

Match 9
23 July 2023
7:00 PM (N)
Scorecard

Durban Qalandars; 122/6 (10 overs)	v	Bulawayo Braves; 97/7 (10 overs)
Tim Seifert 44 (14); Tymal Mills 2/24 (2 overs)		Ashton Turner 32 (23); Brad Evans 3/20 (2 overs)

Durban Qalandars won by 25 runs
Harare Sports Club, Harare
Umpires: Bismillah Jan Shinwari (Afg) and Forster Mutizwa (Zim)
Player of the match: Brad Evans (Durban Qalandars)

- Bulawayo Braves won the toss and elected to field

Match 10
24 July 2023
3:00 PM
Scorecard

Harare Hurricanes; 106/6 (10 overs)	v	Joburg Buffaloes; 104/7 (10 overs)
Robin Uthappa 31 (20); Noor Ahmad 2/20 (2 overs)		Ravi Bopara 39* (19); Nandre Burger 3/12 (2 overs)

Harare Hurricanes won by 2 runs
Harare Sports Club, Harare
Umpires: Percival Sizara (Zim) and Ruchira Palliyaguruge (SL)
Player of the match: Nandre Burger (Harare Hurricanes)

- Joburg Buffaloes won the toss and elected to field.

Match 11
24 July 2023
5:00 PM (D/N)
Scorecard

Durban Qalandars; 91/5 (10 overs)	v	Cape Town Samp Army; 95/6 (9 overs)
Hazratullah Zazai 43 (27); Karim Janat 2/17 (2 overs)		Karim Janat 48* (17); Daryn Dupavillon 2/16 (2 overs)

Cape Town Samp Army won by 4 wickets
Harare Sports Club, Harare
Umpires: Forster Mutizwa (Zim) and Percival Sizara (Zim)
Player of the match: Karim Janat (Cape Town Samp Army)

- Durban Qalandars won the toss and elected to bat

Match 12
24 July 2023
7:00 PM (N)
Scorecard

Harare Hurricanes; 134/4 (10 overs)	v	Bulawayo Braves; 137/3 (9.1 overs)
Evin Lewis 49 (19); Patrick Dooley 2/13 (1 over)		Sikandar Raza 70 (21); Mohammad Nabi 1/18 (2 overs)

Bulawayo Braves won by 7 wickets
Harare Sports Club, Harare
Umpires: Collin Tlou (Zim) and Ruchira Palliyaguruge (SL)
Player of the match: Sikandar Raza (Bulawayo Braves)

- Bulawayo Braves won the toss and elected to field.

Match 13
25 July 2023
3:00 PM
Scorecard

Durban Qalandars; 121/3 (10 overs)	v	Joburg Buffaloes; 119/5 (10 overs)
Tim Seifert 46 (20); Wellington Masakadza 2/22 (2 overs)		Yusuf Pathan 32 (15); Mohammad Amir 2/23 (2 overs)

Durban Qalandars won by 2 wickets
Harare Sports Club, Harare
Umpires: Iknow Chabi (Zim) and Ranmore Martinesz (SL)
Player of the match: Tim Seifert (Durban Qalandars)

- Joburg Buffaloes won the toss and elected to field.

Match 14
25 July 2023
5:00 PM (D/N)
Scorecard

Harare Hurricanes; 115/6 (10 overs	v	Cape Town Samp Army; 115/5 (10 overs)
Donovan Ferreira 87* (33); Sheldon Cottrell 3/2 (2 overs)		Rahmanullah Gurbaz 56 (26); Samit Patel 2/23 (2 overs)

Match tied (Harare Hurricanes won the Super Over)
Harare Sports Club, Harare
Umpires: Bismillah Jan Shinwari (Afg) and Forster Mutizwa (Zim)
Player of the match: Donovan Ferreira (Harare Hurricanes)

- Cape Town Samp Army won the toss and elected to field.
- Super Over: Cape Town Samp Army 7/1, Harare Hurricanes 8/0.

Match 15
25 July 2023
7:00 PM (N)
Scorecard

Joburg Buffaloes; 97/4 (10 overs	v	Bulawayo Braves; 83/8 (10 overs)
Yusuf Pathan 36* (21); Patrick Dooley 2/14 (2 overs)		Sikandar Raza 26 (13); Blessing Muzarabani 2/15 (2 overs)

Joburg Buffaloes won by 14 runs
Harare Sports Club, Harare
Umpires: Collin Tlou (Zim) and Ruchira Palliyaguruge (SL)
Player of the match: Blessing Muzarabani (Joburg Buffaloes)

- Bulawayo Braves won the toss and elected to field.

Match 16
26 July 2023
3:00 PM
Scorecard

Bulawayo Braves; 125/3 (10 overs)	v	Cape Town Samp Army; 122/4 (10 overs)
Innocent Kaia 52* (31); Sheldon Cottrell 1/15 (2 overs)		Rahmanullah Gurbaz 45 (18); Taskin Ahmed 2/25 (2 overs)

Bulawayo Braves won by 3 runs
Harare Sports Club, Harare
Umpires: Iknow Chabi (Zim) and Percival Sizara (Zim)
Player of the match: Innocent Kaia (Bulawayo Braves)

- Bulawayo Braves won the toss and elected to bat.

Match 17
26 July 2023
5:00 PM (D/N)
Scorecard

Harare Hurricanes; 134/2 (10 overs)	v	Durban Qalandars; 110/2 (10 overs)
Robin Uthappa 53 (23); Azmatullah Omarzai 1/17 (2 overs)		Andre Fletcher 50* (25); Luke Jongwe 2/19 (2 overs)

Harare Hurricanes won by 24 runs
Harare Sports Club, Harare
Umpires: Ruchira Palliyaguruge (SL) and Colin Tlou (Zim)
Player of the match: Robin Uthappa (Harare Hurricanes)

- Harare Hurricanes won the toss and elected to bat.

Match 18
26 July 2023
7:00 PM (N)
Scorecard

Cape Town Samp Army; 89/6 (10 overs)	v	Joburg Buffaloes; 90/1 (6.5 overs)
Rahmanullah Gurbaz 27 (12); Blessing Muzarabani 3/7 (2 overs)		Mohammad Hafeez 40* (23); Tom Curran 1/10 (1 over)

Joburg Buffaloes won by 9 wickets
Harare Sports Club, Harare
Umpires: Iknow Chabi (Zim) and Ranmore Martinesz (SL)
Player of the match: Blessing Muzarabani (Joburg Buffaloes)

- Joburg Buffaloes won the toss and elected to field.

Match 19
27 July 2023
17:00 (D/N)
Scorecard

Durban Qalandars; 103/8 (10 Overs)	v	Bulawayo Braves; 96/7 (10 Overs)
Asif Ali 32 (20); Taskin Ahmed 3/20 (2 overs)		Beau Webster 40 (21); Tendai Chatara 3/9 (2 overs)

Durban Qalandars won by 7 runs
Harare Sports Club, Harare
Umpires: Iknow Chabi (Zim) and Ranmore Martinesz (SL)
Player of the match: Tendai Chatara (Durban Qalandars)

- Durban Qalandars won the toss and elected to bat.

Match 20
27 July 2023
19:00 (N)
Scorecard

Harare Hurricanes; 81/7 (10 Overs)	v	Joburg Buffaloes; 82/1 (6.2 Overs)
Mohammad Nabi 19 (14); Noor Ahmad 2/7 (2 overs)		Will Smeed 44* (19); S Sreesanth 1/6 (1 over)

Joburg Buffaloes won by 9 wickets
Harare Sports Club, Harare
Umpires: Forster Mutizwa (Zim) and Bismillah Jan Shinwari (Afg)
Player of the match: Mohammad Hafeez (Joburg Buffaloes)

- Harare Hurricanes won the toss and elected to bat.

== Play-offs ==
The play-offs ran for two days and the top four teams from the league stage advanced.

Qualifier 1 / Eliminator
28 July 2023 - Harare Sports Club, Harare, 15:00
1	Durban Qalandars	140/4 (10 overs)
2	Joburg Buffaloes	142/4 (9.5 overs)
28 July 2023 - Harare Sports Club, Harare, 17:00
3	Cape Town Samp Army	145/3 (10 overs)
4	Harare Hurricanes	146/1 (9.2 overs)

Qualifier 2
28 July 2023 - Harare Sports Club, Harare, 19:00
Q1L	Durban Qalandars	84/6 (8.4 overs)
EW	Harare Hurricanes	82/8 (10 overs)

Final
29 July 2023 - Harare Sports Club, Harare, 17:00
Q1W	Joburg Buffaloes	127/4 (10 overs)
Q2W	Durban Qalandars	129/2 (9.2 overs)

Qualifier 1
28 July 2023
15:00
Scorecard

Durban Qalandars; 140/4 (10 overs)	v	Joburg Buffaloes; 142/4 (9.5 overs)
Andre Fletcher 39 (14); Noor Ahmad 2/9 (2 overs)		Yusuf Pathan 80* (26); Tayyab Abbas 2/19 (2 overs)

Joburg Buffaloes won by 6 wickets
Harare Sports Club, Harare
Umpires: Ruchira Palliyaguruge (SL) and Bismillah Jan Shinwari (Afg)
Player of the match: Yusuf Pathan (Joburg Buffaloes)

- Joburg Buffaloes won the toss and elected to field.

Eliminator
28 July 2023
17:00 (D/N)
Scorecard

Cape Town Samp Army; 145/3 (10 overs)	v	Harare Hurricanes; 146/1 (9.2 overs)
Rahmanullah Gurbaz 62* (26); Nandre Burger 2/18 (2 overs)		Robin Uthappa 88* (36); Richard Ngarava 1/21 (2 overs)

Harare Hurricanes won by 9 wickets
Harare Sports Club, Harare
Umpires: Ranmore Martinesz (SL) and Forster Mutizwa (Zim)
Player of the match: Robin Uthappa (Harare Hurricanes)

- Harare Hurricanes won the toss and elected to field.

Qualifier 2
28 July 2023
19:00 (N)
Scorecard

Harare Hurricanes; 82/8 (10 overs)	v	Durban Qalandars; 84/6 (8.4 overs)
Samit Patel 39* (23); Brad Evans 4/16 (2 overs)		Hazratullah Zazai 25 (16); Nandre Burger 2/13 (2 overs)

Durban Qalandars won by 4 wickets
Harare Sports Club, Harare
Umpires: Iknow Chabi (Zim) and Bismillah Jan Shinwari (Afg)
Player of the match: Brad Evans (Durban Qalandars)

- Durban Qalandars won the toss and elected to field.

Final
29 July 2023
17:00 (D/N)
Scorecard

Joburg Buffaloes; 127/4 (10 overs)	v	Durban Qalandars; 129/2 (9.2 overs)
Tom Banton 36 (17); Azmatullah Omarzai 1/8 (1 over)		Hazratullah Zazai 43* (22); Usman Shinwari 2/15 (2 overs)

Durban Qalandars won by 8 wickets
Harare Sports Club, Harare
Umpires: Ranmore Martinesz (SL) and Bismillah Jan Shinwari (Afg)
Player of the match: Hazratullah Zazai (Durban Qalandars)

- Durban Qalandars won the toss and elected to field.

== Statistics ==
Most runs
Player	Team	Runs	Highest score
Rahmanullah Gurbaz	Cape Town Swamp Army	282	62 not out
Tim Seifert	Durban Qalandars	271	71 not out
Hazratullah Zazai	Durban Qalandars	270	49
Robin Uthappa	Harare Hurricanes	259	88 not out
Donovan Ferreira	Harare Hurricanes	233	87 not out

- Source ESPNcricinfo

Most wickets
Player	Team	Wickets	Best bowling
Brad Evans	Durban Qalandars	14	4/16
Mohammad Hafeez	Joburg Buffaloes	12	6/4
Tendai Chatara	Durban Qalandars	12	3/9
Taskin Ahmed	Bulwayo Braves	11	3/11
Noor Ahmad	Joburg Buffaloes	10	2/7

- Source: ESPNcricinfo
