= South Africa 'A' cricket tour of England 2017 =

South Africa 'A' cricket team in England in 2017
	England Lions	South Africa A
- Dates: 01 June – 01 July 2017
Captains	James Vince (ODIs); Keaton Jennings (Tests)	Khaya Zondo (ODIs); Aiden Markram (Tests)

Test series
- Result: England Lions won the 1-match series 1–0

One Day International series
- Results: England Lions won the 3-match series 2–0

The South Africa A cricket team toured England to play one first-class matches and three limited-overs matches against the England Lions. The Matches were played at Nottingham, Northampton and Canterbury from 1 June to 1 July 2017.

== ODI Series ==
=== 1st Unofficial ODI ===
1 June
11:00 AM
scorecard

Africa A (South Africa); 268 (49 overs)	v	England Lions; 269/1 (40.3 overs)
Heino Kuhn 81*(62); Steven Finn 3/54 (7 overs)		Dawid Malan 125*(110); Tabraiz Shamsi 1/65 (10 overs)

England Lions won by 9 wickets
Trent Bridge, Nottingham
Umpires: Paul Baldwin and D. Millns

- England Lions won the toss and elected to bowl.

=== 2nd Unofficial ODI ===
3 June
11:00 AM

England Lions; 349/7 (50 overs)	v	South Africa A 205 (41.3 overs)
Liam Livingstone 129(83); Aiden Markram 4/45 (9 overs)		Aiden Markram 50(49); Liam Dawson 4/41 (10 overs)

England Lions won by 144 runs.
County Ground, Northampton
Umpires: T Robinson and M Saggers

- South Africa A won the toss and elected to bowl.

=== 3rd Unofficial ODI ===
5 June
14:00 PM

England Lions; 28/0 (5 overs)	v	(South Africa) Africa A
Ben Duckett 16*(15); Duanne Olivier 0/11 (2 overs)

No Result
County Ground, Northampton
Umpires: N Bainton and N Cook

- Africa A won the toss and elected to bat
- Rain reduced the England Lions innings to 5 overs
- No further play was possible due to rain
