= Kyle Verreynne =

South African cricketer (born 1997)

- Verreynne in 2026

Personal information
- Born: 12 May 1997 (age 29); Pretoria, Gauteng, South Africa
- Batting: Right-handed
- Role: Wicket-keeper

International information
- National side: South Africa
- Test debut (cap 348): 10 June 2021 v West Indies
- Last Test: 14 November 2025 v India
- ODI debut (cap 138): 29 February 2020 v Australia
- Last ODI: 12 February 2025 v Pakistan

Domestic team information
- Years: Team
- 2014/15–present: Western Province
- 2017/18–2020/21: Cape Cobras
- 2018: Cape Town Blitz
- 2019: Paarl Rocks
- 2023: Joburg Super Kings
- 2024–present: Nottinghamshire (squad no. 7)
- 2024–2025: Pretoria Capitals
- 2026: Paarl Royals

Career statistics
Competition	Test	ODI	FC	LA
Matches	32	19	126	85
Runs scored	1,280	533	7,465	2,750
Batting average	29.09	38.07	45.24	43.65
100s/50s	4/3	0/5	17/34	5/19
Top score	136*	95	216*	114*
Catches/stumpings	95/13	11/1	383/30	99/14
Medal record
Men's cricket
Representing South Africa
World Test Championship
Winner	2023–2025
- Source: Cricinfo, 13 October 2026

Kyle Verreynne (born 12 May 1997) is a South African professional cricket batter and wicket-keeper who represents the South Africa national team and Western Province. He also plays for Nottinghamshire in the County Championship. Making his senior international debut in 2020, he was a regular member of the South Africa team that won the 2023–2025 World Test Championship.

== Domestic career ==
He made his Twenty20 cricket debut for Western Province against Namibia on 2 September 2016 in the 2016 Africa T20 Cup.

In June 2018, he was named in the squad for the Cape Cobras team for the 2018–19 season. In October 2018, he was named in Cape Town Blitz's squad for the first edition of the Mzansi Super League T20 tournament. In September 2019, he was named in Western Province's squad for the 2019–20 CSA Provincial T20 Cup. In April 2021, he was named in Western Province's squad, ahead of the 2021–22 cricket season in South Africa.

During the SA20 competition played in 2023, Verreynne was part of the Joburg Super Kings squad.

In August 2024, Verreynne signed a deal with Nottinghamshire County Club to play three County Championship matches. In his third appearance for the club, he scored an unbeaten 148, including 19 fours and two sixes, against Warwickshire at Trent Bridge. In December 2024, Verreynne agreed a deal to rejoin Nottinghamshire for 12 of their 14 County Championship matches in the 2025 season. Having hit the six which clinched the bonus point that secured the 2025 County Championship title for Nottinghamshire, he signed a new contract with the club in November 2025 covering the entire 2026 season.

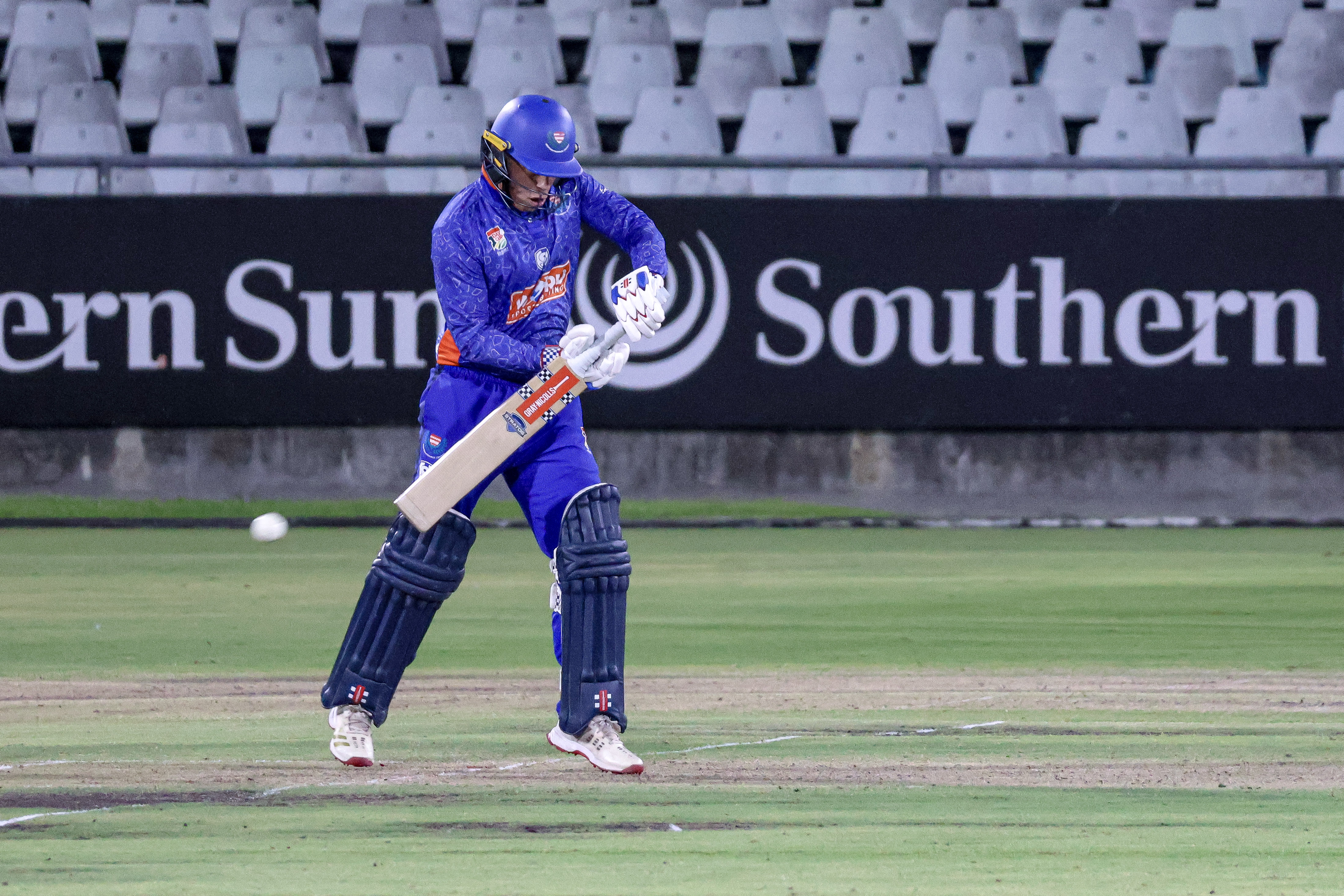
Kyle Verreynne batting for Western Province in 2026

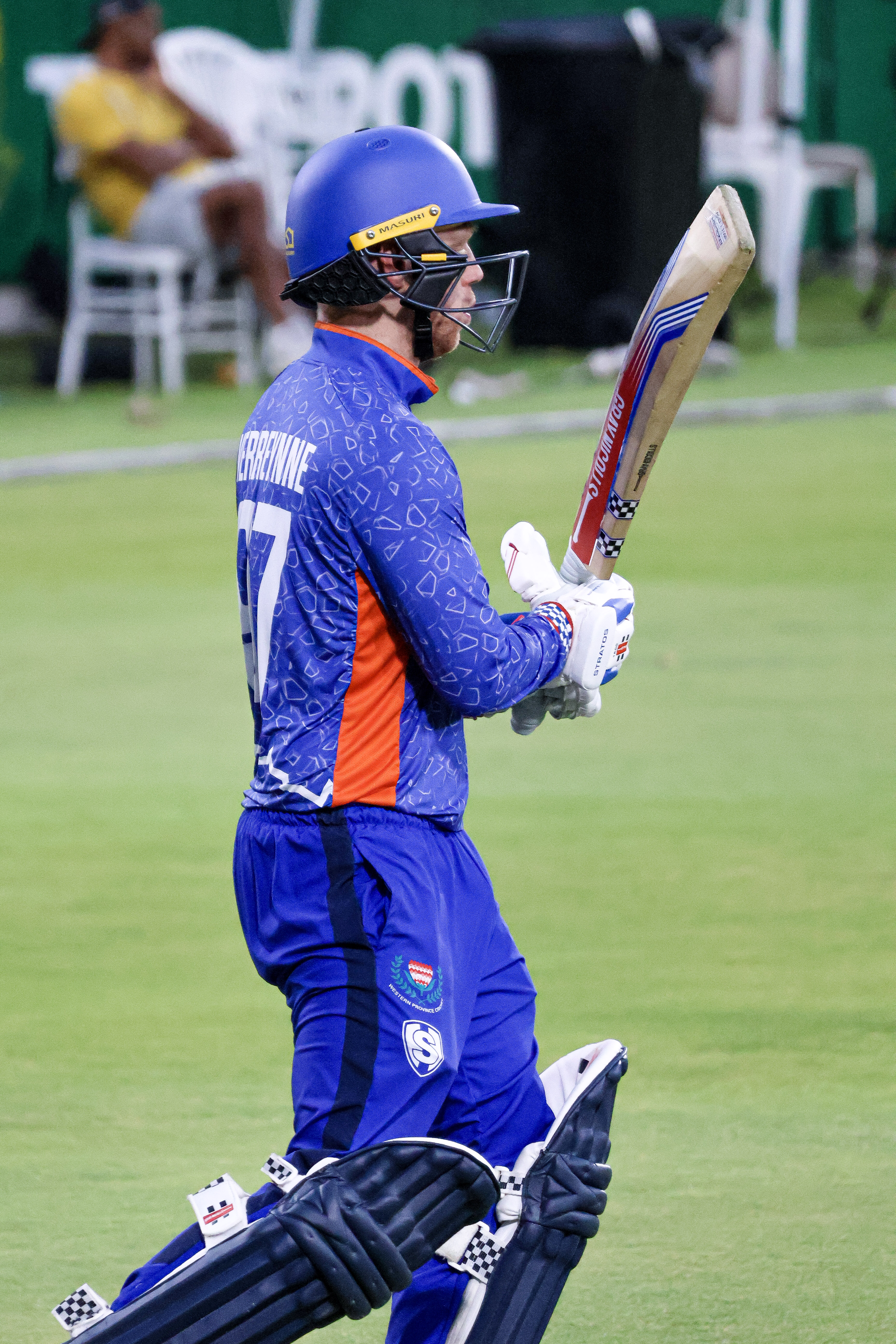
Kyle Verreynne playing for Western Province in 2026

== International career ==
In December 2015, he was named in South Africa's squad for the 2016 Under-19 Cricket World Cup.

In January 2020, he was named in South Africa's One Day International (ODI) squad for their series against England. The following month, he was also named in South Africa's ODI squad for their series against Australia. He made his ODI debut for South Africa, against Australia, on 29 February 2020.

In November 2020, Verreynne was named in South Africa's squad for their limited overs series against England. In December 2020, Verreynne was named in South Africa's Test squad for their series against Sri Lanka.

In March 2021, Verreynne was named in South Africa's Twenty20 International (T20I) squad for their series against Pakistan. In May 2021, Verreynne was named in South Africa's Test squad for their series against the West Indies. Verreynne made his Test debut on 10 June 2021, for South Africa against the West Indies, scoring 6 runs, at Gros Islet, St Lucia. In February 2022, in the second match against New Zealand, Verreynne scored his first century in Test cricket, with an unbeaten 136 runs.

Verreynne was a part of the playing XI that won the 2025 ICC World Test Championship final. He hit the winning run.

== International centuries ==
Test centuries by Kyle Verreynne
No.	Runs	Balls	Innings	Against	Venue	Country	Date	Result
1	136*	187	3	New Zealand	Hagley Oval, Christchurch	New Zealand	25 February 2022	South Africa won by 198 runs
2	114	144	2	Bangladesh	Sher-e-Bangla National Cricket Stadium, Dhaka	Bangladesh	21 October 2024	South Africa won by 7 wickets
3	105*	133	1	Sri Lanka	St George's Park, Gqeberha	South Africa	5 December 2024	South Africa won by 109 runs
4	100	147	1	Pakistan	Newlands Cricket Ground, Cape Town	South Africa	3 January 2025	South Africa won by 10 wickets
