= Australian cricket team in South Africa in 2019–20 =

International cricket tour

	South Africa	Australia
- Dates: 21 February – 7 March 2020
Captains	Quinton de Kock	Aaron Finch

One Day International series
- Results: South Africa won the 3-match series 3–0
Most runs	Heinrich Klaasen (242)	Marnus Labuschagne (149)
Most wickets	Lungi Ngidi (9)	Pat Cummins (4)
- Player of the series: Heinrich Klaasen (SA)

Twenty20 International series
- Results: Australia won the 3-match series 2–1
Most runs	Quinton de Kock (77)	David Warner (128)
Most wickets	Lungi Ngidi (5)	Ashton Agar (8)
- Player of the series: Aaron Finch (Aus)

The Australia cricket team toured South Africa in February and March 2020 to play three One Day Internationals (ODIs) and three Twenty20 International (T20I) matches. Cricket South Africa confirmed the fixtures for the tour in May 2019. On 17 February 2020, the day after the conclusion of the home series against England, Faf du Plessis announced that he had stepped down as the captain of South Africa's Test and T20I sides. Later the same day, South Africa announced their squad for the T20I series against Australia, with Quinton de Kock as captain and du Plessis included in the team.

The tour marked the return of Steve Smith and David Warner. They had last played for Australia in South Africa in the third Test match in March 2018, after being found guilty of ball-tampering during the game. Australia won the T20I series 2–1. In the ODI series, South Africa won the first two matches to take an unassailable lead. South Africa won the third and final ODI match by six wickets, to win the series 3–0. It was South Africa's eighth-consecutive win in ODIs at home against Australia.

== Squads ==
ODIs		T20Is	
South Africa	Australia	South Africa	Australia
Quinton de Kock (c, wk); Temba Bavuma; Daryn Dupavillon; Beuran Hendricks; Heinrich Klaasen; Keshav Maharaj; Janneman Malan; David Miller; Lungi Ngidi; Anrich Nortje; Andile Phehlukwayo; ~~Kagiso Rabada~~; Tabraiz Shamsi; Lutho Sipamla; JJ Smuts; Rassie van der Dussen; Kyle Verreynne	Aaron Finch (c); Alex Carey (vc, wk); Pat Cummins (vc); Ashton Agar; Josh Hazlewood; Marnus Labuschagne; Mitchell Marsh; ~~Glenn Maxwell~~; Jhye Richardson; Kane Richardson; D'Arcy Short; Steve Smith; Mitchell Starc; Matthew Wade; David Warner; Adam Zampa	Quinton de Kock (c, wk); Temba Bavuma; Faf du Plessis; Bjorn Fortuin; Reeza Hendricks; Heinrich Klaasen; David Miller; Lungi Ngidi; Anrich Nortje; Andile Phehlukwayo; Dwaine Pretorius; Kagiso Rabada; Tabraiz Shamsi; JJ Smuts; Dale Steyn; Pite van Biljon; Rassie van der Dussen	Aaron Finch (c); Alex Carey (vc, wk); Pat Cummins (vc); Sean Abbott; Ashton Agar; Mitchell Marsh; ~~Glenn Maxwell~~; Jhye Richardson; Kane Richardson; D'Arcy Short; Steve Smith; Mitchell Starc; Matthew Wade; David Warner; Adam Zampa

Glenn Maxwell was ruled out of Australia's ODI and T20I squads due to an elbow injury, with D'Arcy Short named as his replacement. Ahead of the second T20I, Reeza Hendricks was added to South Africa's squad, following injuries to Temba Bavuma and Heinrich Klaasen. During the T20I series, Jhye Richardson was added to Australia's ODI squad. Kagiso Rabada suffered a groin injury during the T20I series and was then ruled out of South Africa's ODI squad. Ahead of the second ODI, Temba Bavuma was withdrawn from South Africa's squad due to injury, with Rassie van der Dussen replacing him. Australia's Mitchell Starc flew home ahead of the third ODI, so he could watch his wife, Alyssa Healy, play in the final of the 2020 ICC Women's T20 World Cup. Daryn Dupavillon was added to South Africa's squad for the third ODI.

== T20I series ==
=== 1st T20I ===
21 February 2020
18:00 (N)
Scorecard

Australia; 196/6 (20 overs)	v	South Africa; 89 (14.3 overs)
Steve Smith 45 (32); Dale Steyn 2/31 (4 overs); Tabraiz Shamsi 2/31 (4 overs)		Faf du Plessis 24 (22); Ashton Agar 5/24 (4 overs)

Australia won by 107 runs
Wanderers Stadium, Johannesburg
Umpires: Adrian Holdstock (SA) and Allahudien Paleker (SA)
Player of the match: Ashton Agar (Aus)

- South Africa won the toss and elected to field.
- Pite van Biljon (SA) made his T20I debut.
- Ashton Agar became the second bowler for Australia, and 13th overall, to take a hat-trick in T20Is.
- Ashton Agar (Aus) also took his first five-wicket haul in T20Is.
- This was South Africa's lowest total in T20Is.
- In terms of runs, this was South Africa's biggest defeat in T20Is.

=== 2nd T20I ===
23 February 2020
14:30
Scorecard

South Africa; 158/4 (20 overs)	v	Australia; 146/6 (20 overs)
Quinton de Kock 70 (47); Kane Richardson 2/21 (4 overs)		David Warner 67* (56); Lungi Ngidi 3/41 (4 overs)

South Africa won by 12 runs
St. George's Park, Port Elizabeth
Umpires: Bongani Jele (SA) and Allahudien Paleker (SA)
Player of the match: Quinton de Kock (SA)

- South Africa won the toss and elected to bat.

=== 3rd T20I ===
26 February 2020
18:00 (N)
Scorecard

Australia; 193/5 (20 overs)	v	South Africa; 96 (15.3 overs)
David Warner 57 (37); Tabraiz Shamsi 1/25 (4 overs)		Rassie van der Dussen 24 (19); Ashton Agar 3/16 (4 overs)

Australia won by 97 runs
Newlands Cricket Ground, Cape Town
Umpires: Adrian Holdstock (SA) and Bongani Jele (SA)
Player of the match: Mitchell Starc (Aus)

- South Africa won the toss and elected to field.

== ODI series ==
=== 1st ODI ===
29 February 2020
13:00 (D/N)
Scorecard

South Africa; 291/7 (50 overs)	v	Australia; 217 (45.1 overs)
Heinrich Klaasen 123* (114); Pat Cummins 3/45 (10 overs)		Steve Smith 76 (94); Lungi Ngidi 3/30 (8 overs)

South Africa won by 74 runs
Boland Park, Paarl
Umpires: Adrian Holdstock (SA) and Nigel Llong (Eng)
Player of the match: Heinrich Klaasen (SA)

- South Africa won the toss and elected to bat.
- Janneman Malan and Kyle Verreynne (SA) both made their ODI debuts.
- Pat Cummins (Aus) took his 100th wicket in ODIs.
- Heinrich Klaasen (SA) scored his first century in ODIs.

=== 2nd ODI ===
4 March 2020
13:00 (D/N)
Scorecard

Australia; 271 (50 overs)	v	South Africa; 274/4 (48.3 overs)
D'Arcy Short 69 (83); Lungi Ngidi 6/58 (10 overs)		Janneman Malan 129* (139); Adam Zampa 2/48 (10 overs)

South Africa won by 6 wickets
Mangaung Oval, Bloemfontein
Umpires: Richard Illingworth (Eng) and Bongani Jele (SA)
Player of the match: Lungi Ngidi (SA) and Janneman Malan (SA)

- Australia won the toss and elected to bat.
- Lungi Ngidi became the fastest bowler for South Africa, in terms of matches, to take 50 wickets in ODIs (26). He also took his first five-wicket haul in ODIs.
- Janneman Malan (SA) scored his first century in ODIs.

=== 3rd ODI ===
7 March 2020
10:00
Scorecard

Australia; 254/7 (50 overs)	v	South Africa; 258/4 (45.3 overs)
Marnus Labuschagne 108 (108); Anrich Nortje 2/35 (7 overs)		JJ Smuts 84 (98); Josh Hazlewood 2/37 (10 overs)

South Africa won by 6 wickets
Senwes Park, Potchefstroom
Umpires: Adrian Holdstock (SA) and Richard Illingworth (Eng)
Player of the match: JJ Smuts (SA)

- South Africa won the toss and elected to field.
- Daryn Dupavillon (SA) made his ODI debut.
- Marnus Labuschagne (Aus) scored his first century in ODIs.
