= Bangladeshi cricket team in Zimbabwe in 2021 =

International cricket tour

	Zimbabwe	Bangladesh
- Dates: 7 – 25 July 2021
Captains	Brendan Taylor (Test & ODIs); Sikandar Raza (T20Is)	Mominul Haque (Test); Tamim Iqbal (ODIs); Mahmudullah (T20Is)

Test series
- Result: Bangladesh won the 1-match series 1–0
Most runs	Brendan Taylor (173)	Mahmudullah (150)
Most wickets	Blessing Muzarabani (4)	Mehidy Hasan (9)

One Day International series
- Results: Bangladesh won the 3-match series 3–0
Most runs	Regis Chakabva (164)	Litton Das (155)
Most wickets	Luke Jongwe (6)	Shakib Al Hasan (8)
- Player of the series: Shakib Al Hasan (Ban)

Twenty20 International series
- Results: Bangladesh won the 3-match series 2–1
Most runs	Wesley Madhevere (150)	Soumya Sarkar (126)
Most wickets	Luke Jongwe (5)	Shoriful Islam (6)
- Player of the series: Soumya Sarkar (Ban)

The Bangladesh cricket team toured Zimbabwe in July 2021 to play one Test, three One Day International (ODI), and three Twenty20 International (T20I) matches. The ODI series formed part of the inaugural 2020–2023 ICC Cricket World Cup Super League. Bangladesh last toured Zimbabwe in April and May 2013. Originally, two Test matches were scheduled to be played on the tour, but one of the Tests was replaced with an additional T20I match.

Despite the suspension of sporting activity due to the COVID-19 pandemic, Zimbabwe's Sports and Recreation Commission (SRC) gave its permission for the tour to go ahead. In June 2021, the tour itinerary was confirmed by Zimbabwe Cricket, with all the matches being played in a bio-secure environment at the Harare Sports Club behind closed doors.

The Bangladesh cricket team arrived in Zimbabwe on 30 June 2021, following a twelve-team T20 tournament in Bangladesh. During the one-off Test match, Bangladesh's Mahmudullah announced his retirement from Test cricket. Bangladesh went on to win the Test match by 220 runs. Bangladesh won the first ODI by 155 runs, and the second match by three wickets, to win the series with a match to spare. Bangladesh won the third ODI by five wickets to win the series 3–0.

On 19 July 2021, both cricket boards agreed to a minor reschedule of the T20I fixtures. The end date of the tour was brought forward by two days, due to "scheduling and logistical challenges".

The first T20I match of the series was also the 100th T20I to be played by Bangladesh. With their eight-wicket victory, they became the third team, after Australia and Pakistan, to win their 100th match in all three formats of international cricket. Zimbabwe won the second T20I match by 23 runs to level the series with one match to play. Bangladesh won the third T20I match by five wickets to take the series 2–1.

== Squads ==
Test		ODIs		T20Is	
Zimbabwe	Bangladesh	Zimbabwe	Bangladesh	Zimbabwe	Bangladesh
Brendan Taylor (c); ~~Sean Williams (c)~~; Regis Chakabva; Tendai Chatara; Tendai Chisoro; Tanaka Chivanga; ~~Craig Ervine~~; Joylord Gumbie; Luke Jongwe; Roy Kaia; Takudzwanashe Kaitano; Kevin Kasuza; Timycen Maruma; Wellington Masakadza; Blessing Muzarabani; Dion Myers; Richard Ngarava; Victor Nyauchi; Milton Shumba; Donald Tiripano	Mominul Haque (c); Taskin Ahmed; Yasir Ali; Litton Das (wk); Mehidy Hasan; Nayeem Hasan; Nurul Hasan; Saif Hassan; Shakib Al Hasan; Ebadot Hossain; Tamim Iqbal; Shadman Islam; Shoriful Islam; Taijul Islam; Abu Jayed; Mahmudullah; Mushfiqur Rahim; Najmul Hossain Shanto	Brendan Taylor (c); Ryan Burl; Regis Chakabva; Tendai Chatara; Luke Jongwe; Tinashe Kamunhukamwe; Wesley Madhevere; Timycen Maruma; Tadiwanashe Marumani; Wellington Masakadza; Blessing Muzarabani; Dion Myers; Richard Ngarava; Sikandar Raza; Milton Shumba; Donald Tiripano	Tamim Iqbal (c); Taskin Ahmed; Litton Das (wk); Mehidy Hasan; Nurul Hasan; Shakib Al Hasan; Afif Hossain; Mosaddek Hossain; Rubel Hossain; Shoriful Islam; Taijul Islam; Mohammad Mithun; Mohammad Naim; ~~Mushfiqur Rahim (wk)~~; Mustafizur Rahman; Mahmudullah; Mohammad Saifuddin	Sikandar Raza (c); Ryan Burl; Regis Chakabva; Tendai Chatara; Luke Jongwe; Tinashe Kamunhukamwe; Wesley Madhevere; Tadiwanashe Marumani; Wellington Masakadza; Tarisai Musakanda; Blessing Muzarabani; Dion Myers; Richard Ngarava; Milton Shumba; Donald Tiripano	Mahmudullah (c); Nasum Ahmed; Taskin Ahmed; Litton Das (wk); Mahedi Hasan; Nurul Hasan (wk); Shakib Al Hasan; Afif Hossain; Shamim Hossain; ~~Tamim Iqbal~~; Aminul Islam; Shoriful Islam; Mohammad Naim; ~~Mushfiqur Rahim~~; Mustafizur Rahman; Mohammad Saifuddin; Soumya Sarkar

Three days after the Bangladesh Cricket Board (BCB) had named the squads for the tour, Mahmudullah was added to Bangladesh's Test squad. Initially, Mahmudullah had not been included in the Test squad after not being able to bowl due to an injury. After initially opting out of the T20I matches, Bangladesh's Mushfiqur Rahim made himself available for the fixtures. However, he later pulled out of the ODI and T20I squads due to family reasons. Tamim Iqbal was ruled out of Bangladesh's T20I squad due to a knee injury.

Sean Williams was initially named as Zimbabwe's captain for the one-off Test. However, Williams and Craig Ervine both had to go into self-isolation, after being in close-contact with an individual who was COVID-19 positive. As a result, Brendan Taylor was named as Zimbabwe's captain for the match. Taylor was also named as captain of Zimbabwe's ODI team, with Williams and Ervine continuing to isolate. Brendan Taylor was rested for the T20I fixtures with Sikandar Raza named as Zimbabwe's captain for the matches.

== Warm-up matches ==
3–4 July 2021
Scorecard

Bangladesh	v	Zimbabwe Select XI
313/2d (90 overs); Shakib Al Hasan 74* (56); Luke Jongwe 1/23 (11 overs)		202 (74.5 overs); Timycen Maruma 58 (132); Shakib Al Hasan 3/34 (12.5 overs)
22/0 (7.1 overs); Tamim Iqbal 18* (30)

Match drawn
Takashinga Sports Club, Harare
Umpires: Forster Mutizwa (Zim) and Langton Rusere (Zim)

- Bangladesh won the toss and elected to bat.

14 July 2021
09:30
Scorecard

Bangladesh; 296/6 (50 overs)	v	Zimbabwe Select XI; 189/7 (40.1 overs)
Tamim Iqbal 66 (62); Wesley Madhevere 2/12 (4 overs)		Timycen Maruma 59* (59); Mosaddek Hossain 2/16 (6.1 overs)

No result
Takashinga Sports Club, Harare
Umpires: Forster Mutizwa (Zim) and Christopher Phiri (Zim)

- Bangladesh won the toss and elected to bat.
- No further play was possible due to bad light.

== Only Test ==
7–11 July 2021
Scorecard

Bangladesh	v	Zimbabwe
468 (126 overs); Mahmudullah 150* (278); Blessing Muzarabani 4/94 (29 overs)		276 (111.5 overs); Takudzwanashe Kaitano 87 (311); Mehidy Hasan 5/82 (31 overs)
284/1d (67.4 overs); Najmul Hossain Shanto 117* (118); Richard Ngarava 1/36 (9 overs)		256 (94.4 overs); Brendan Taylor 92 (73); Mehidy Hasan 4/66 (30.4 overs)

Bangladesh won by 220 runs
Harare Sports Club, Harare
Umpires: Marais Erasmus (SA) and Langton Rusere (Zim)
Player of the match: Mahmudullah (Ban)

- Bangladesh won the toss and elected to bat.
- Takudzwanashe Kaitano and Dion Myers (Zim) both made their Test debuts.
- Mahmudullah (Ban) played in his 50th Test and this was his last test.
- Shadman Islam (Ban) scored his first century in Tests.

== ODI series ==
=== 1st ODI ===
16 July 2021
09:30
Scorecard

Bangladesh; 276/9 (50 overs)	v	Zimbabwe; 121 (28.5 overs)
Litton Das 102 (114); Luke Jongwe 3/51 (9 overs)		Regis Chakabva 54 (51); Shakib Al Hasan 5/30 (9.5 overs)

Bangladesh won by 155 runs
Harare Sports Club, Harare
Umpires: Marais Erasmus (SA) and Langton Rusere (Zim)
Player of the match: Litton Das (Ban)

- Zimbabwe won the toss and elected to field.
- Tadiwanashe Marumani and Dion Myers (Zim) both made their ODI debuts.
- Brendan Taylor (Zim) played in his 200th ODI.
- Shakib Al Hasan became the leading wicket-taker for Bangladesh in ODIs, taking his 270th dismissal.
- World Cup Super League points: Bangladesh 10, Zimbabwe 0.

=== 2nd ODI ===
18 July 2021
09:30
Scorecard

Zimbabwe; 240/9 (50 overs)	v	Bangladesh; 242/7 (49.1 overs)
Wesley Madhevere 56 (63); Shoriful Islam 4/46 (10 overs)		Shakib Al Hasan 96* (109); Luke Jongwe 2/46 (8 overs)

Bangladesh won by 3 wickets
Harare Sports Club, Harare
Umpires: Iknow Chabi (Zim) and Marais Erasmus (SA)
Player of the match: Shakib Al Hasan (Ban)

- Zimbabwe won the toss and elected to bat.
- Shakib Al Hasan (Ban) scored his 12,000th run in international cricket.
- World Cup Super League points: Bangladesh 10, Zimbabwe 0.

=== 3rd ODI ===
20 July 2021
09:30
Scorecard

Zimbabwe; 298 (49.3 overs)	v	Bangladesh; 302/5 (48 overs)
Regis Chakabva 84 (91); Mustafizur Rahman 3/57 (9.3 overs)		Tamim Iqbal 112 (97); Wesley Madhevere 2/45 (10 overs)

Bangladesh won by 5 wickets
Harare Sports Club, Harare
Umpires: Iknow Chabi (Zim) and Marais Erasmus (SA)
Player of the match: Tamim Iqbal (Ban)

- Bangladesh won the toss and elected to field.
- Mahmudullah (Ban) played in his 200th ODI.
- World Cup Super League points: Bangladesh 10, Zimbabwe 0.

== T20I series ==
=== 1st T20I ===
22 July 2021
12:30
Scorecard

Zimbabwe; 152 (19 overs)	v	Bangladesh; 153/2 (18.5 overs)
Regis Chakabva 43 (22); Mustafizur Rahman 3/31 (4 overs)		Mohammad Naim 63* (51)

Bangladesh won by 8 wickets
Harare Sports Club, Harare
Umpires: Christopher Phiri (Zim) and Langton Rusere (Zim)
Player of the match: Soumya Sarkar (Ban)

- Zimbabwe won the toss and elected to bat.
- Dion Myers (Zim) made his T20I debut.
- Soumya Sarkar (Ban) scored his 1,000th run in T20Is.

=== 2nd T20I ===
23 July 2021
12:30
Scorecard

Zimbabwe; 166/6 (20 overs)	v	Bangladesh; 143 (19.5 overs)
Wesley Madhevere 73 (57); Shoriful Islam 3/33 (4 overs)		Shamim Hossain 29 (13); Wellington Masakadza 3/20 (4 overs)

Zimbabwe won by 23 runs
Harare Sports Club, Harare
Umpires: Iknow Chabi (Zim) and Forster Mutizwa (Zim)
Player of the match: Wesley Madhevere (Zim)

- Zimbabwe won the toss and elected to bat.
- Shamim Hossain (Ban) made his T20I debut.

=== 3rd T20I ===
25 July 2021
12:30
Scorecard

Zimbabwe; 193/5 (20 overs)	v	Bangladesh; 194/5 (19.2 overs)
Wesley Madhevere 54 (36); Soumya Sarkar 2/19 (3 overs)		Soumya Sarkar 68 (49); Blessing Muzarabani 2/27 (4 overs)

Bangladesh won by 5 wickets
Harare Sports Club, Harare
Umpires: Iknow Chabi (Zim) and Langton Rusere (Zim)
Player of the match: Soumya Sarkar (Ban)

- Zimbabwe won the toss and elected to bat.
