= Gerald Dros =

Irish/South African cricketer (born 1973)

Personal information
- Full name: Gerald Dros
- Born: 2 April 1973 (age 53); Pretoria, Transvaal, South Africa
- Batting: Right-handed
- Bowling: Right-arm medium

Domestic team information
- Years: Team
- 1993/94–1996/97: Northern Transvaal/ Northerns
- 1999–2004: Ireland
- 2003/04–2006/07: Titans

Career statistics
| Competition | FC | LA | T20 |
|---|---|---|---|
| Matches | 81 | 137 | 26 |
| Runs scored | 4,022 | 3,634 | 325 |
| Batting average | 32.96 | 36.70 | 21.66 |
| 100s/50s | 4/22 | 5/21 | –/– |
| Top score | 136 | 124 | 35* |
| Balls bowled | 2,325 | 1,132 | 0 |
| Wickets | 39 | 34 | – |
| Bowling average | 30.84 | 29.58 | – |
| 5 wickets in innings | 1 | – | – |
| 10 wickets in match | – | – | – |
| Best bowling | 5/17 | 3/21 | – |
| Catches/stumpings | 97/– | 59/– | 11/– |
- Source: Cricinfo, 30 December 2021

Gerald Dros (born 2 April 1973) is a South African cricketer. He has represented both Ireland (from 1999 to 2004 as an overseas player) and South Africa A (from 2000 to 2002) during his cricketing career.

His career stretches back to 1993 when he first joined the Northern Transvaal cricket team. He first represented Northern Transvaal in the UCB Bowl tournament of 1993, where he made his debut scoring 42 and 30 in his two innings and making a solid contribution with the ball.

He has stayed with the sport over the last 12 years, most recently victorious in the victorious Northerns' South African Airways Three-Day Challenge final. He also participated in the final of the losing Northerns' Standard Bank cup run of 2000–01.

Dros represented Ireland during the 1999 Natwest Trophy and the 2004 C&G Trophy.
