= Imran Butt (cricketer) =

Pakistani cricketer

Personal information
- Born: 27 December 1995 (age 30); Lahore, Punjab, Pakistan
- Batting: Right-handed
- Role: Batsman

International information
- National side: Pakistan
- Test debut (cap 242): 26 January 2021 v South Africa
- Last Test: 20 August 2021 v West Indies

Domestic team information
- Years: Team
- 2012/13–2014/15: Lahore Shalimar
- 2015/16–2018/19: Sui Northern Gas Pipelines
- 2013–2015: Lahore Lions
- 2016: Lahore Qalandars
- 2017: North West Warriors
- 2019–2022: Balochistan
- 2023–present: Lahore Blues (squad no. 62)

Career statistics
Competition	Test	FC	LA	T20
Matches	6	78	38	16
Runs scored	178	4,656	1,305	135
Batting average	17.80	34.74	37.28	13.50
100s/50s	0/1	10/24	2/8	0/0
Top score	91	214	104	37
Catches/stumpings	16/–	94/–	9/–	8/–
- Source: Cricinfo, 24 August 2021

Imran Butt (born 27 December 1995) is a Pakistani cricketer who plays for Lahore Blues in domestic cricket. He made his debut for the Pakistan cricket team in January 2021. He also played for other Lahore cricket teams and Balochistan in Pakistan domestic cricket.

== Domestic career ==
He made his first-class debut for Lahore Shalimar on 28 December 2012, against Karachi Whites in the 2012–13 Quaid-e-Azam Trophy. He made his List A debut for Lahore Lions on 5 March 2013, against Karachi Zebras in the 2012–13 National One Day Cup. He made his Twenty20 debut for Lahore Eagles on 24 September 2014, against Faisalabad Wolves in the 2014–15 National T20 Cup.

In September 2019, he was named in Balochistan's squad for the 2019–20 Quaid-e-Azam Trophy tournament. He was the leading run-scorer in the tournament, with 934 runs in nine matches.

== International career ==
In June 2020, he was named as one of four reserve players for Pakistan's tour to England during the COVID-19 pandemic. In November 2020, he was named in Pakistan's 35-man squad for their tour to New Zealand. In December 2020, he was named in Pakistan's Test side for the first match against New Zealand. In January 2021, he was also named in Pakistan's Test squad for their series against South Africa. He made his Test debut for Pakistan, against South Africa, on 26 January 2021, scoring 9 runs in the first innings and 12 in the second.

In April 2023, he was named in Pakistan A's squad as the captain for their first-class and List A series against Zimbabwe.
