= Tanaka Chivanga =

Zimbabwean cricketer

Personal information
- Full name: Tanaka Lance Chivanga
- Born: 24 July 1993 (age 33); Goromonzi, Zimbabwe
- Batting: Right-handed
- Bowling: Right-arm fast
- Role: Bowler

International information
- National side: Zimbabwe
- Test debut (cap 126): 12 February 2023 v West Indies
- Last Test: 7 August 2025 v New Zealand
- ODI debut (cap 147): 4 June 2022 v Afghanistan
- Last ODI: 20 August 2022 v India
- ODI shirt no.: 27
- T20I debut (cap 67): 17 May 2022 v Namibia
- Last T20I: 31 July 2022 v Bangladesh
- T20I shirt no.: 27

Domestic team information
- Years: Team
- 2021–: Mashonaland Eagles

Career statistics
Competition	Test	ODI	FC	LA
Matches	1	5	18	27
Runs scored	9	11	194	120
Batting average	9.00	5.50	10.77	10
100s/50s	0/0	0/0	0/0	0/0
Top score	6	6*	69	18
Balls bowled	84	218	2114	1182
Wickets	0	3	57	33
Bowling average	–	65.66	21.40	33.81
5 wickets in innings	–	0	4	1
10 wickets in match	–	0	0	0
Best bowling	–	1/38	6/38	6/31
Catches/stumpings	0/–	1/–	8/–	6/–
- Source: Cricinfo, 7 August 2025

Tanaka Chivanga (born 24 July 1993) is a Zimbabwean cricketer. He made his international debut for the Zimbabwe cricket team in May 2022.

== Career ==
In December 2020, he was selected to play for the Eagles in the 2020–21 Logan Cup. He made his first-class debut on 9 December 2020, for Eagles, in the 2020–21 Logan Cup tournament.

He made his Twenty20 debut on 10 April 2021, for also for Eagles, in the 2020–21 Zimbabwe Domestic Twenty20 Competition. On 14 April 2021, the match between Eagles and Rocks went to a Super Over, with Chivanga named the man of the match due to his bowling at the end of the game. Three days later, Chivanga was named in Zimbabwe's squad for their Twenty20 International (T20I) series against Pakistan. Prior to his selection to the national team, Chivanga had also played for the Zimbabwe A cricket team. On 26 April 2021, Chivanga was named in Zimbabwe's Test squad, also for the series against Pakistan.

In May 2021, he was named in the Zimbabwe A squad for their series against South Africa A. He made his List A debut on 29 May 2021, for Zimbabwe A against South Africa A. In July 2021, Chivanga was named in Zimbabwe's Test squad for their one-off match against Bangladesh.

In May 2022, Chivanga was named in Zimbabwe's T20I squad for their five-match home series against Namibia. He made his T20I debut on 17 May 2022, for Zimbabwe against Namibia. The following month, he was named in Zimbabwe's One Day International (ODI) squad for their series against Afghanistan. He made his ODI debut on 4 June 2022, for Zimbabwe against Afghanistan.

On 12 February 2023, Chivanga made his Test debut against the West Indies.
