= Pakistani cricket team in South Africa in 2020–21 =

International cricket tour

	South Africa	Pakistan
- Dates: 2 – 16 April 2021
Captains	Temba Bavuma (ODIs); Heinrich Klaasen (T20Is)	Babar Azam

One Day International series
- Results: Pakistan won the 3-match series 2–1
Most runs	Rassie van der Dussen (183)	Fakhar Zaman (302)
Most wickets	Anrich Nortje (7)	Haris Rauf (7)
- Player of the series: Fakhar Zaman (Pak)

Twenty20 International series
- Results: Pakistan won the 4-match series 3–1
Most runs	Aiden Markram (179)	Babar Azam (210)
Most wickets	Lizaad Williams (7)	Hasan Ali (7)
- Player of the series: Babar Azam (Pak)

The Pakistan cricket team toured South Africa in April 2021 to play three One Day International (ODI) and four Twenty20 International (T20I) matches. The ODI series formed part of the inaugural 2020–2023 ICC Cricket World Cup Super League.

Originally, the matches were scheduled to be played in October 2020. However, in August 2020, the tour was postponed due to the COVID-19 pandemic. The following month, it was confirmed that both cricket boards were looking for a window in the international calendar to play the matches. In October 2020, Cricket South Africa (CSA) announced that the tour had been rescheduled for April 2021. In January 2021, the Pakistan Cricket Board (PCB) confirmed that the tour was still on their schedule for the 2021 calendar year. In February 2021, the tour dates were confirmed, including the addition of a fourth T20I fixture. On 4 March 2021, CSA announced that Temba Bavuma had been appointed as South Africa's limited overs captain, taking over the role from Quinton de Kock.

Pakistan won the first ODI by three wickets, with South Africa winning the second match by seventeen runs to level the series. Pakistan won the third ODI by 28 runs to win the series 2–1. In the T20I series, Pakistan won the first match by four wickets, with South Africa winning the second match by six wickets. The third match saw Pakistan win by nine wickets, with their captain Babar Azam scoring his first century in the format. Pakistan won the fourth T20I by three wickets to win the series 3–1.

== Squads ==
ODIs		T20Is	
South Africa	Pakistan	South Africa	Pakistan
Temba Bavuma (c); Junior Dala; Quinton de Kock (wk); Daryn Dupavillon; Beuran Hendricks; Heinrich Klaasen; Keshav Maharaj; Sisanda Magala; Janneman Malan; Aiden Markram; David Miller; Wiaan Mulder; Lungi Ngidi; Anrich Nortje; Andile Phehlukwayo; Kagiso Rabada; Tabraiz Shamsi; Lutho Sipamla; JJ Smuts; Rassie van der Dussen; Kyle Verreynne; Lizaad Williams	Babar Azam (c); Shadab Khan (vc); Shaheen Afridi; Sarfaraz Ahmed (wk); Asif Ali; Haider Ali; Hasan Ali; Faheem Ashraf; Danish Aziz; Mohammad Hasnain; Mohammad Nawaz; Haris Rauf; Mohammad Rizwan (wk); Abdullah Shafique; ~~Saud Shakeel~~; Usman Qadir; Imam-ul-Haq; Mohammad Wasim; Fakhar Zaman	Heinrich Klaasen (c); ~~Temba Bavuma (c)~~; Daryn Dupavillon; Bjorn Fortuin; Beuran Hendricks; ~~Reeza Hendricks~~; George Linde; Wihan Lubbe; Sisanda Magala; Janneman Malan; Aiden Markram; Wiaan Mulder; Andile Phehlukwayo; ~~Dwaine Pretorius~~; Migael Pretorius; Tabraiz Shamsi; Lutho Sipamla; Pite van Biljon; Rassie van der Dussen; Kyle Verreynne (wk); Lizaad Williams	Babar Azam (c); ~~Shadab Khan (vc)~~; Shaheen Afridi; Sarfaraz Ahmed (wk); Asif Ali; Haider Ali; Hasan Ali; Faheem Ashraf; Danish Aziz; Mohammad Hafeez; Mohammad Hasnain; Arshad Iqbal; Sharjeel Khan; Mohammad Nawaz; Usman Qadir; Haris Rauf; Mohammad Rizwan (wk); Mohammad Wasim; Fakhar Zaman

Ahead of the tour, Saud Shakeel was ruled out of Pakistan's ODI squad due to an injury, with Asif Ali named as his replacement. Quinton de Kock, David Miller, Kagiso Rabada, Lungi Ngidi and Anrich Nortje were only available for the first two ODIs, before leaving South Africa's squad to play in the 2021 Indian Premier League. Pakistan's Shadab Khan injured his toe during the second ODI and was ruled out of the rest of the tour. Fakhar Zaman was named as Shadab Khan's replacement for the T20I matches.

Before the T20I series, South Africa's captain Temba Bavuma was ruled out of the squad after suffering a hamstring injury in the third ODI, with Heinrich Klaasen named as captain of the team in Bavuma's place. Dwaine Pretorius was also ruled out due to rib injury, and Reeza Hendricks opted out of the series for personal reasons. Aiden Markram, Andile Phehlukwayo, Daryn Dupavillon and Wiaan Mulder were added to South Africa's T20I squad.

== ODI series ==
=== 1st ODI ===
2 April 2021
10:00
Scorecard

South Africa; 273/6 (50 overs)	v	Pakistan; 274/7 (50 overs)
Rassie van der Dussen 123* (134); Shaheen Afridi 2/61 (10 overs)		Babar Azam 103 (104); Anrich Nortje 4/51 (10 overs)

Pakistan won by 3 wickets
Centurion Park, Centurion
Umpires: Marais Erasmus (SA) and Adrian Holdstock (SA)
Player of the match: Babar Azam (Pak)

- Pakistan won the toss and elected to field.
- Danish Aziz (Pak) made his ODI debut.
- Temba Bavuma captained South Africa for the first time in ODIs.
- Rassie van der Dussen (SA) scored his first century in ODIs.
- Rassie van der Dussen (SA) also became the oldest cricketer for South Africa to score his first century in ODIs (32 years and 54 days).
- World Cup Super League points: Pakistan 10, South Africa –1. (Note: South Africa were deducted one World Cup Super League point for bowling a slow over-rate.)

=== 2nd ODI ===
4 April 2021
10:00
Scorecard

South Africa; 341/6 (50 overs)	v	Pakistan; 324/9 (50 overs)
Temba Bavuma 92 (102); Haris Rauf 3/54 (10 overs)		Fakhar Zaman 193 (155); Anrich Nortje 3/63 (10 overs)

South Africa won by 17 runs
Wanderers Stadium, Johannesburg
Umpires: Marais Erasmus (SA) and Allahudien Paleker (SA)
Player of the match: Fakhar Zaman (Pak)

- Pakistan won the toss and elected to field.
- Fakhar Zaman (Pak) scored his 2,000th run in ODIs.
- Fakhar Zaman (Pak) also made the highest individual total batting second in ODIs.
- World Cup Super League points: South Africa 10, Pakistan 0.

=== 3rd ODI ===
7 April 2021
10:00
Scorecard

Pakistan; 320/7 (50 overs)	v	South Africa; 292 (49.3 overs)
Fakhar Zaman 101 (104); Keshav Maharaj 3/45 (10 overs)		Janneman Malan 70 (81); Mohammad Nawaz 3/34 (7 overs)

Pakistan won by 28 runs
Centurion Park, Centurion
Umpires: Marais Erasmus (SA) and Bongani Jele (SA)
Player of the match: Babar Azam (Pak)

- South Africa won the toss and elected to field.
- Usman Qadir (Pak) made his ODI debut.
- World Cup Super League points: Pakistan 10, South Africa 0.

== T20I series ==
=== 1st T20I ===
10 April 2021
14:30
Scorecard

South Africa; 188/6 (20 overs)	v	Pakistan; 189/6 (19.5 overs)
Aiden Markram 51 (32); Mohammad Nawaz 2/21 (4 overs)		Mohammad Rizwan 74* (50); Beuran Hendricks 3/32 (4 overs)

Pakistan won by 4 wickets
Wanderers Stadium, Johannesburg
Umpires: Adrian Holdstock (SA) and Allahudien Paleker (SA)
Player of the match: Mohammad Rizwan (Pak)

- South Africa won the toss and elected to bat.
- Wihan Lubbe, Sisanda Magala and Lizaad Williams (SA) all made their T20I debuts.
- Mohammad Hafeez (Pak) played in his 100th T20I.

=== 2nd T20I ===
12 April 2021
14:30
Scorecard

Pakistan; 140/9 (20 overs)	v	South Africa; 141/4 (14 overs)
Babar Azam 50 (50); George Linde 3/23 (4 overs)		Aiden Markram 54 (30); Usman Qadir 2/26 (3 overs)

South Africa won by 6 wickets
Wanderers Stadium, Johannesburg
Umpires: Adrian Holdstock (SA) and Bongani Jele (SA)
Player of the match: George Linde (SA)

- Pakistan won the toss and elected to bat.

=== 3rd T20I ===
14 April 2021
14:30
Scorecard

South Africa; 203/5 (20 overs)	v	Pakistan; 205/1 (18 overs)
Aiden Markram 63 (31); Mohammad Nawaz 2/38 (4 overs)		Babar Azam 122 (59); Lizaad Williams 1/34 (4 overs)

Pakistan won by 9 wickets
Centurion Park, Centurion
Umpires: Bongani Jele (SA) and Allahudien Paleker (SA)
Player of the match: Babar Azam (Pak)

- Pakistan won the toss and elected to field.
- Babar Azam (Pak) played in his 50th T20I, and scored his first century in T20Is.
- Mohammad Rizwan and Babar Azam made the highest partnership for any wicket for Pakistan in T20Is (197).
- This was Pakistan's highest successful run chase in T20Is.

=== 4th T20I ===
16 April 2021
14:30
Scorecard

South Africa; 144 (19.3 overs)	v	Pakistan; 149/7 (19.5 overs)
Rassie van der Dussen 52 (36); Faheem Ashraf 3/17 (4 overs)		Fakhar Zaman 60 (34); Sisanda Magala 2/33 (4 overs)

Pakistan won by 3 wickets
Centurion Park, Centurion
Umpires: Shaun George (SA) and Adrian Holdstock (SA)
Player of the match: Faheem Ashraf (Pak)

- Pakistan won the toss and elected to field.
- Wiaan Mulder (SA) made his T20I debut.
