= Zim Afro T10 =

Zimbabwean professional cricket league

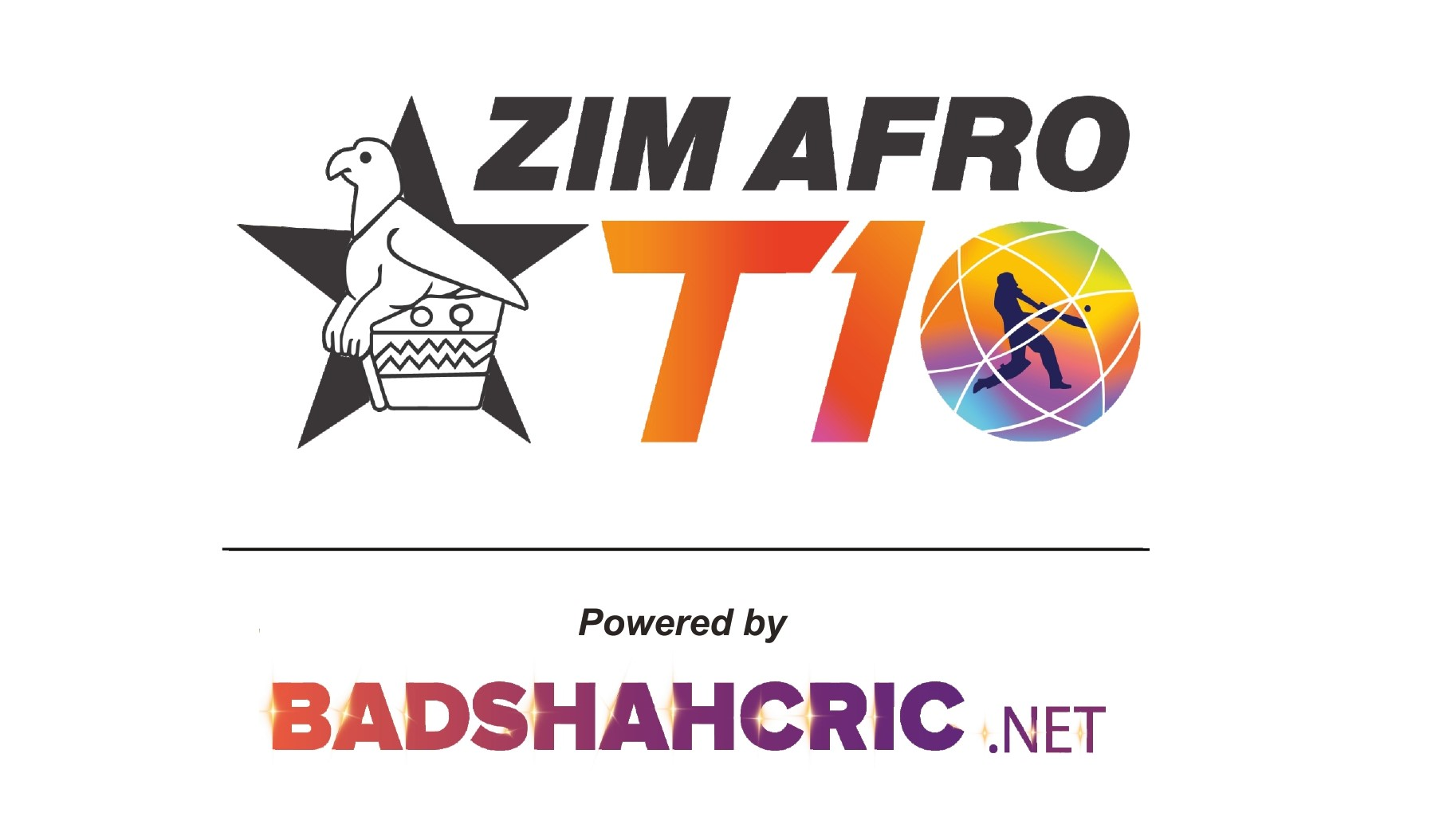
- Administrator: Zimbabwe Cricket
- Format: T10
- First edition: 2023
- Latest edition: 2024
- Tournament format: Page playoff system with double round-robin
- Number of teams: 6
- Current champion: Joburg Bangla Tigers (1st title)
- Most successful: Durban Qalandars; Joburg Bangla Tigers (1 title each)
- Website: https://zimafrot10.com/

The Zim Afro T10 is a T10 cricket league in Zimbabwe that features teams from South Africa, Zimbabwe, and Nigeria. The league is owned by T Ten Sports Management and was launched in 2023 in association with Zimbabwe Cricket. The tournament uses a double round-robin followed by a series of playoff matches. The inaugural edition of the tournament was played in July 2023.

== History ==
The league was founded by Shaji Ul Mulk, the chairman of the Abu Dhabi T10 league. The Zimbabwe edition was announced at the final of the 2022 Abu Dhabi T10, with an expectation that the inaugural edition would take place in 2023. The first tournament was played between 21 and 29 July 2023 at Harare Sports Club. In the final, Durban Qalandars defeated Joburg Buffaloes by eight wickets.

Five privately owned franchise teams competed in the first season of the league in 2023. The second season, which saw the number of competing teams rise to six, was set to be played between 21 and 29 September 2024.

== Team list ==
Team	Country	Debut	Captain	Head coach
Bulawayo Brave Jaguars	Zimbabwe	2023	David Warner	Owais Shah
Cape Town Samp Army	South Africa	2023	Rohan Mustafa	James Foster
Durban Wolves	South Africa	2023	Yasir Shah	Moin Khan
Harare Bolts	Zimbabwe	2023	Dasun Shanaka	Pubudu Dassanayake
Joburg Bangla Tigers	South Africa	2023	Chris Lynn	Julian Wood
NYS Lagos	Nigeria	2024	Thisara Perera	Chaminda Vaas

=== Franchise history ===
Franchise	2023	2024
Bulawayo	Bulawayo Braves	Bulawayo Brave Jaguars
Cape Town	Cape Town Samp Army	
Durban	Durban Qalandars	Durban Wolves
Harare	Harare Hurricanes	Harare Bolts
Johannesburg	Joburg Buffaloes	Joburg Bangla Tigers
Lagos	—N/a	NYS Lagos

== Sponsorship ==
Real estate company Zim Cyber City was named the title sponsor of the inaugural Zim Afro T10 League.

The 2nd edition of the Zim Afro T10 League partnered with Badshahcric, a well-known online sports betting company, as the exclusive sponsor.

== Seasons and results ==
Season	Venue	Final			Player of the series
Season	Venue	Winners	Result	Runners-up	Player of the series
2023	Harare Sports Club, Harare	Durban Qalandars; 129/2 (9.2 overs)	Won by 8 wickets Scorecard	Joburg Buffaloes; 127/4 (10 overs)	Tim Seifert (Durban Qalandars)
2024	Harare Sports Club, Harare	Joburg Bangla Tigers; 129/5 (10 overs)	Won by 5 runs Scorecard	Cape Town Samp Army; 124/2 (10 overs)	Sikandar Raza (Joburg Bangla Tigers)

== Team's performance ==
Season Team	2023	2024
Bulawayo Brave Jaguars	5th	5th
Cape Town Samp Army	4th	RU
Durban Wolves	W	6th
Harare Bolts	3rd	3rd
Joburg Bangla Tigers	RU	W
NYS Lagos	–	4th
