= Heinrich Klaasen =

South African cricketer (born 1991)

Personal information
- Born: 30 July 1991 (age 35); Pretoria, Transvaal Province, South Africa
- Height: 1.83 m (6 ft 0 in)
- Batting: Right-handed
- Bowling: Right-arm off spin
- Role: Wicket-keeper batsman

International information
- National side: South Africa (2018–2025)
- Test debut (cap 339): 19 October 2019 v India
- Last Test: 8 March 2023 v West Indies
- ODI debut (cap 125): 7 February 2018 v India
- Last ODI: 5 March 2025 v New Zealand
- ODI shirt no.: 45
- T20I debut (cap 75): 17 February 2018 v India
- Last T20I: 13 December 2024 v Pakistan
- T20I shirt no.: 45

Domestic team information
- Years: Team
- 2011/12–present: Northerns
- 2014/15–2020/21: Titans
- 2018: Rajasthan Royals
- 2018/19: Durban Heat
- 2019: Royal Challengers Bangalore
- 2019/20: Tshwane Spartans
- 2022: Guyana Amazon Warriors
- 2023–present: Durban's Super Giants
- 2023–present: Sunrisers Hyderabad
- 2023: Oval Invincibles
- 2025–present: Manchester Super Giants
- 2026: Rotterdam Dockers

Career statistics
Competition	Test	ODI	T20I	FC
Matches	4	60	58	85
Runs scored	104	2,141	1,000	5,347
Batting average	13.00	43.69	23.25	46.09
100s/50s	0/0	4/11	0/5	12/24
Top score	35	174	81	292
Balls bowled	–	30	6	88
Wickets	–	0	0	2
Bowling average	–	–	–	25.00
5 wickets in innings	–	–	–	0
10 wickets in match	–	–	–	0
Best bowling	–	–	–	1/12
Catches/stumpings	10/2	51/7	33/5	272/23
Medal record
Men's Cricket
Representing South Africa
ICC T20 World Cup
Runner-up	2024 West Indies & USA
- Source: ESPNcricinfo, 22 December 2024

Heinrich Klaasen (born 30 July 1991) is a South African cricketer who played for the South Africa national cricket team between 2018 and 2025. He also briefly captained South Africa in T20I matches. He is considered one of the most destructive players in limited overs cricket in the modern era and is renowned for his adept power-hitting capabilities.

== Domestic and T20 career ==
In August 2017, Klaasen was named in Nelson Mandela Bay Stars' squad for the first season of the T20 Global League. However, in October 2017, Cricket South Africa initially postponed the tournament until November 2018, with it being cancelled soon after.

On 2 April 2018, Klaasen joined the Indian Premier League team Rajasthan Royals replacing Steve Smith.

In June 2018, Klaasen was named in the squad for the Titans team for the 2018–19 season. In October 2018, he was named in Durban Heat's squad for the first edition of the Mzansi Super League T20 tournament.

In December 2018, Klaasen was bought by the Royal Challengers Bangalore in the player auction for the 2019 Indian Premier League. In June 2019, he was selected to play for the Toronto Nationals franchise team in the 2019 Global T20 Canada tournament. In July 2019, he was selected to play for the Glasgow Giants in the inaugural edition of the Euro T20 Slam cricket tournament. However, the following month the tournament was cancelled.

In September 2019, Klaasen was named in the squad for the Tshwane Spartans team for the 2019 Mzansi Super League tournament. He was released by the Royal Challengers Bangalore ahead of the 2020 IPL auction.

Shukri Conrad, a coach at Cricket South Africa's National Academy, stated that Klaasen could become South Africa's equivalent of MS Dhoni. In September 2015, he said, "Klaasen stays very calm in the situation. He stays in the moment. There’s very much a ‘poor man’s MS Dhoni’ about him. There are really no sideshows to his game and really takes the game to the opposition. He doesn't wait for the game to come to him and that is what I like most about him. He is as tough as they come."

In April 2021, Klaasen was named in Northerns' squad, ahead of the 2021–22 cricket season in South Africa.

He was bought by Sunrisers Hyderabad to play in the 2023 Indian Premier League.

In February 2023, Klaasen scored the second century in the SA20 tournament, making 104 not out from 44 balls for Durban's Super Giants against Pretoria Capitals. In May 2023, he also made his maiden IPL century against former team Bangalore, scoring 104 runs of 51 balls.

In July 2023, Klaassen became the first person in Major League Cricket to score a century playing for the Seattle Orcas against MI New York scoring 110 runs from 44 balls.

On 25 May 2025, Klaasen hit his 2nd IPL century, hitting 105* off 39 balls against KKR. He reached his century in only 37 balls, making it the joint 3rd fastest century in the history of the IPL, alongside Yusuf Pathan.

== International career ==
In February 2017, Klaasen was named in South Africa's Test squad for their series against New Zealand, but did not play.

In February 2018, Klaasen was added to South Africa's One Day International (ODI) squad for their series against India, replacing an injured Quinton de Kock. He made his ODI debut against India on 7 February 2018. He won his first international man of the match award in his second ODI, in the fourth ODI of the home series against India, with a match-winning 43 runs off 27 balls.

In the same month, Klaasen was named in the South Africa Twenty20 International (T20I) squad, also for their series against India. He made his T20I debut for South Africa against India on 18 February 2018. On 21 February, Klaasen scored his maiden T20I fifty in the second T20I against India which South Africa won by 6 wickets, he was also awarded the man of the match for his 69 runs from 30 balls, which included 3 fours and 7 sixes.

In February 2018, Klaasen was named in South Africa's Test squad for their series against Australia, but did not play. In August 2019, he was added to South Africa's Test squad for their series against India, replacing the injured Rudi Second. He made his Test debut for South Africa, against India, on 19 October 2019. On 29 February 2020, Klaasen scored his first century in an ODI match, making an unbeaten 123 against Australia.

In January 2021, Klaasen was named to captain the South Africa T20I squad for their away series against Pakistan. In April 2021, Klaasen was again named as South Africa's T20I captain, this time for their home series against Pakistan, after Temba Bavuma was ruled out due to an injury. In September 2021, Klaasen was named in the South Africa squad for the 2021 ICC Men's T20 World Cup.

On October 21 2023 during the 2023 Cricket World Cup in India, Klaasen scored a notable century (109 of 67 balls) against England in Mumbai earning him Man of the Match

On 8 January 2024, Klaasen announced his retirement from Test cricket, having played only 4 matches since his debut in 2019.

In May 2024, he was named in South Africa’s squad for the 2024 ICC Men's T20 World Cup tournament.

In June 2024, he went on to score the fastest fifty in the history of ICC events finals, men and women, surpassing the record of Alyssa Healy scoring it in 23 balls. South Africa lost the final by 7 runs to India after Klaasen was dismissed by Hardik Pandya in the 17th over for 52 runs off 27 balls. Earlier he smashed 2 fours and 2 sixes in the 15th over bowled by Axar Patel to bring the equation to 30 runs needed off 30 balls.

On 2 June 2025, Klaasen announced his retirement from international cricket. His decision, shared via social media, was influenced by a desire to spend more time with his family and to focus on franchise-based T20 leagues. He featured 122 international games, including 4 Tests (104 runs), 60 ODIs (2,141 runs) and 58 T20Is (1,000 runs).
