= Nyasha Mayavo =

Zimbabwean cricketer (born 1992)

Personal information
- Full name: Nyasha Prince Mayavo
- Born: 1 October 1992 (age 34); Bulawayo, Zimbabwe
- Batting: Right-handed
- Bowling: Right-arm leg break
- Role: Wicket-keeper, Batter

International information
- National side: Zimbabwe (2023–present)
- Test debut (cap 134): 6 February 2024 v Ireland
- Last Test: 20 April 2025 v Bangladesh
- Only T20I (cap 74): 29 October 2023 v Namibia

Career statistics
Competition	Test	T20I	FC	LA
Matches	2	1	84	74
Runs scored	62	0	3396	1018
Batting average	15.50	–	26.12	17.55
100s/50s	0/0	0/0	4/17	0/5
Top score	35	–	149	88
Catches/stumpings	9/0	0/0	185/18	80/18
- Source: ESPNcricinfo, 25 April 2025

Nyasha Mayavo (born 1 October 1992) is a Zimbabwean first-class cricketer who plays for Mid West Rhinos. He was the leading run-scorer in the 2017–18 Logan Cup for Mid West Rhinos, with 550 runs in seven matches.

In June 2018, he was named in a Board XI team for warm-up fixtures ahead of the 2018 Zimbabwe Tri-Nation Series. In December 2020, he was selected to play for the Rhinos in the 2020–21 Logan Cup. In May 2023, he was named in Zimbabwe A's squad for their first class match series against Pakistan A. He made his T20I debut against Namibia in October 2023.
