= Dion Myers =

Zimbabwean cricketer (born 2002)

Personal information
- Full name: Dion Nephy Myers
- Born: 21 March 2002 (age 24); Harare, Zimbabwe
- Batting: Right-handed
- Bowling: Right-arm medium
- Role: Top-order batsman

International information
- National side: Zimbabwe
- Test debut (cap 120): 7 July 2021 v Bangladesh
- Last Test: 6 July 2025 v South Africa
- ODI debut (cap 144): 16 July 2021 v Bangladesh
- Last ODI: 19 December 2024 v Afghanistan
- ODI shirt no.: 8
- T20I debut (cap 65): 22 July 2021 v Bangladesh
- Last T20I: 9 February 2026 v Oman

Domestic team information
- Years: Team
- 2020-present: Mountaineers

Career statistics
Competition	Test	ODI	T20I	FC
Matches	5	10	31	22
Runs scored	174	154	568	1,560
Batting average	17.40	15.40	21.03	40.00
100s/50s	0/1	0/0	0/2	4/8
Top score	57	34	96	204*
Balls bowled	33	12	48	694
Wickets	0	1	0	12
Bowling average	–	13.00	–	44.25
5 wickets in innings	–	0	–	0
10 wickets in match	–	–	–	0
Best bowling	–	1/13	–	2/61
Catches/stumpings	4/–	4/–	8/–	15/–
- Source: Cricinfo, 2 January 2026

Dion Nephy Myers (born 21 March 2002) is a Zimbabwean cricketer. He made his international debut for the Zimbabwe cricket team in July 2021.

== Career ==
Myers made his first-class debut on 9 December 2020, for Mountaineers, in the 2020–21 Logan Cup. Prior to his first-class debut, he was named in Zimbabwe's squad for the 2020 Under-19 Cricket World Cup. He made his Twenty20 debut on 10 April 2021, for Mountaineers, in the 2020–21 Zimbabwe Domestic Twenty20 Competition. He made his List A debut on 18 April 2021, for Mountaineers, in the 2020–21 Pro50 Championship.

In May 2021, he earned his maiden call up to the Zimbabwe A cricket team for the List A series against South Africa A. In the first match of the series, he scored 96 runs, which was also his first half-century in List A cricket.

In July 2021, Myers was named in Zimbabwe's Test squad for their one-off match against Bangladesh. He made his Test debut on 7 July 2021, for Zimbabwe against Bangladesh. In July 2021, Myers was named in Zimbabwe's One Day International (ODI) squad, also for their series against Bangladesh. Myers made his ODI debut on 16 July 2021, for Zimbabwe against Bangladesh. After the conclusion of the ODI matches, Myers was also named in Zimbabwe's Twenty20 International (T20I) for the matches against Bangladesh. Myers made his T20I debut on 22 July 2021, also for Zimbabwe against Bangladesh.
