= Daryn Dupavillon =

South African cricketer

Personal information
- Full name: Daryn Miles Dupavillon
- Born: 15 July 1994 (age 32); Durban, KwaZulu-Natal, South Africa
- Batting: Right-handed
- Bowling: Right-arm fast
- Role: Bowler

International information
- National side: South Africa
- ODI debut (cap 139): 7 March 2020 v Australia
- Last ODI: 7 April 2021 v Pakistan

Domestic team information
- Years: Team
- 2012/13: KwaZulu-Natal Inland
- 2013/14–present: KwaZulu-Natal Coastal
- 2013/14–2020/21: Dolphins
- 2019: Durban Heat
- 2022: Trinbago Knight Riders
- 2023: Pretoria Capitals
- 2024: Derbyshire

Career statistics
Competition	ODI	FC	LA	T20
Matches	2	82	38	70
Runs scored	17	871	136	45
Batting average	17.00	13.82	13.60	6.42
100s/50s	0/0	0/0	0/0	0/0
Top score	17	44	24*	8
Balls bowled	66	11,581	1,737	1,376
Wickets	1	242	54	84
Bowling average	51.00	26.59	27.50	21.30
5 wickets in innings	0	11	1	1
10 wickets in match	0	2	0	0
Best bowling	1/21	7/24	6/28	5/20
Catches/stumpings	0/0	20/–	9/–	16/–
- Source: ESPNcricinfo, 19 August 2024

Daryn Miles Dupavillon (born 15 July 1994) is a South African cricketer who represents KwaZulu-Natal and Pretoria Capitals. He is a right-arm fast bowler who bats right-handed. He made his international debut for South Africa in March 2020.

== Career ==
Dupavillon made his first-class debut for KwaZulu-Natal Inland against North West, on 14 March 2013. In August 2017, he was named in Durban Qalandars' squad for the first season of the T20 Global League. However, in October 2017, Cricket South Africa initially postponed the tournament until November 2018, with it being cancelled soon after.

In September 2019, Dupavillon was named in the squad for the Durban Heat team for the 2019 Mzansi Super League tournament. Later the same month, he was named in KwaZulu-Natal's squad for the 2019–20 CSA Provincial T20 Cup.

In March 2020, Dupavillon was added to South Africa's One Day International (ODI) squad for the third and final match against Australia. He made his ODI debut for South Africa, against Australia, on 7 March 2020.

In January 2021, Dupavillon was named in South Africa's Test squad for their series against Pakistan. In April 2021, Dupavillon was added to South Africa's Twenty20 International (T20I) squad for their series against Pakistan. Later the same month, he was named in KwaZulu-Natal's squad, ahead of the 2021–22 cricket season in South Africa. In March 2022, Dupavillon was named in South Africa's Test squad for their series against Bangladesh.
