= Tendai Chatara =

Zimbabwean cricketer

Personal information
- Full name: Tendai Larry Chatara
- Born: 28 February 1991 (age 35); Chimanimani, Zimbabwe
- Batting: Right-handed
- Bowling: Right-arm fast-medium
- Role: Bowler

International information
- National side: Zimbabwe (2013–present)
- Test debut (cap 85): 12 March 2013 v West Indies
- Last Test: 11 November 2018 v Bangladesh
- ODI debut (cap 114): 24 February 2013 v West Indies
- Last ODI: 18 June 2023 v Zimbabwe
- ODI shirt no.: 13
- T20I debut (cap 27): 13 June 2010 v India
- Last T20I: 30 October 2023 v Namibia
- T20I shirt no.: 13

Domestic team information
- Years: Team
- 2009–present: Mountaineers
- 2017: Band-e-Amir Dragons

Career statistics
| Competition | Test | ODI | T20I | FC |
|---|---|---|---|---|
| Matches | 9 | 87 | 60 | 60 |
| Runs scored | 90 | 206 | 49 | 724 |
| Batting average | 6.42 | 6.44 | 8.17 | 11.67 |
| 100s/50s | 0/0 | 0/0 | 0/0 | 0/1 |
| Top score | 22 | 23 | 8 | 68 |
| Balls bowled | 1,695 | 4,254 | 1,557 | 10,214 |
| Wickets | 24 | 115 | 65 | 215 |
| Bowling average | 27.62 | 32.62 | 23.95 | 21.86 |
| 5 wickets in innings | 1 | 0 | 0 | 10 |
| 10 wickets in match | 0 | 0 | 0 | 1 |
| Best bowling | 5/61 | 4/33 | 3/14 | 6/33 |
| Catches/stumpings | 0/– | 8/0 | 7/– | 17/– |
- Source: ESPNCricinfo, 18 June 2023

Tendai Larry Chatara (born 28 February 1991) is an international cricketer who represents the Zimbabwe national cricket team. A tall, wiry fast bowler with appreciable pace and the ability to move the ball away from the right-hander, Chatara rose quickly to prominence after his first-class debut for Mountaineers in 2009.

Chatara is naturally athletic. He represented his home town Manicaland in 200 and 400 m events, before getting a call-up to cricket.

== Domestic career ==
Chatara played for Zimbabwe at U-19 Level and has played one match for the senior cricket team. He also played for them at the ICC Intercontinental Cup as a part of the Zimbabwe XI in 2009.

Chatara was quite brilliant in the domestic circuit, especially in his first-class career. He made his first-class debut in 2009 for Mountaineers against Mid West Rhinos. He gave away just 25 runs from 7 overs in the first innings with a brilliant economy rate of 3.57. He soon rose to prominence with 71 wickets from just 20 matches. He performed well in other formats as well such as List A and Twenty20 cricket.

Chatara made his List A debut for Mountaineers against Mashonaland Eagles. In the match, he got his maiden List A wicket with the dismissal of Cephas Zhuwao.

Chatara made his Twenty20 debut for Mountaineers against Mid West Rhinos in 2010, taking 1 wicket, his maiden Twenty20 wicket, with the dismissal of Zimbabwe's wicket keeper-batsman, Brendan Taylor.

In December 2020, Chatara was selected to play for the Mountaineers in the 2020–21 Logan Cup.

== International career ==
Chatara's domestic performances prompted the Zimbabwean selectors to select him for the senior cricket team's Twenty20 International series against India. He made his debut in the second T20I where he took his maiden wicket at international senior level with the dismissal of Yusuf Pathan.

That same year, Chatara represented his nation in the 2010 ICC Under-19 Cricket World Cup, and the following year, in 2011, he was selected for Zimbabwe's tri-nation series against Australia and South Africa A cricket teams.

In January 2015, Chatara was named in Zimbabwe's 15-man squad for the 2015 Cricket World Cup.

In February 2016, Chatara was named in Zimbabwe's 15-man squad for the 2016 T20 World Cup.

In June 2018, Chatara was named in a Board XI team for warm-up fixtures ahead of the 2018 Zimbabwe Tri-Nation Series.

In May 2021, Chatara was named as the captain in the Zimbabwe A's squad for their home series against South Africa.

In July 2021, Chatara was named in Zimbabwe's 20-man Test squad for their one-off Test against Bangladesh. It was Chatara's return to the Test squad after three years, having last played a Test against the same opposition in November 2018 at the time.
