= South Africa A cricket team =

Second-tier national team

South Africa A

Personnel
- Captain: Tony de Zorzi
- Coach: Shukri Conrad

Team information
- Founded: 1992

History
- First-class debut: England A in January 1994
- Official website: Official Website

The South Africa A cricket team is a national cricket team representing South Africa. It is the second-tier of international South African cricket, below the full South Africa national cricket team. Matches played by South Africa A are not Test matches or One Day Internationals, instead receiving first-class and List A classification respectively. Tony de Zorzi is the current captain of the side, while they are being coached by Shukri Conrad.

== History ==
South Africa A played their first match in January 1994, a five-day first-class contest against the touring England A cricket team.

South Africa A have played a number of series, both home and away against other national A teams, and competed against other first-class opposition. Their first tour was to Zimbabwe in 1994–95, when they played three first-class matches and three one-day matches, including one match against Zimbabwe A. They played their first Twenty20 in November 2009, facing an England XI as part of the English tour of South Africa.

== Current squad ==
This is a list of players who have played at least 2 First-Class matches or 3 List A matches for South Africa A team since 2018.
International cap players are marked in Bold.

Name	Age	Batting style	Bowling style	Domestic team	Forms	Note
Batsmen
**Khaya Zondo**	35	Right-handed	Right-arm off spin	Dolphins	FC, LA	
**Pieter Malan**	36	Right-handed	Right-arm medium-fast	Cape Cobras	FC, LA	
**Zubayr Hamza**	30	Right-handed	Right-arm leg spin	Cape Cobras	FC	
**Sarel Erwee**	36	Left-handed	Right-arm off spin	Dolphins	FC, LA	
**Theunis de Bruyn**	33	Right-handed	Right-arm medium-fast	Titans	FC, LA	
**Reeza Hendricks**	36	Right-handed	Right-arm off spin	Lions	LA	
**Temba Bavuma**	35	Right-handed	Right-arm medium	Lions	LA	List A Captain
**Farhaan Behardien**	42	Right-handed	Right-arm fast-medium	Titans	LA	
**Janneman Malan**	29	Right-handed	Right-arm leg spin	Cape Cobras	LA	
All-rounders
**Senuran Muthusamy**	31	Left-handed	Slow left-arm orthodox	Dolphins	FC, LA	
**Wiaan Mulder**	27	Right-handed	Right-arm medium	Lions	FC	
Shaun von Berg	39	Right-handed	Right-arm leg spin	Knights	FC, LA	
**Marco Jansen**	25	Right-handed	Left-arm fast	Knights	FC, LA	
Wicket-keepers
**Heinrich Klaasen**	34	Right-handed	Wicket Keeper	Titans	FC, LA	
Rudi Second	36	Right-handed	Wicket Keeper	Warriors	FC, LA	
**Gihahn Cloete**	33	Left-handed	Wicket Keeper	Warriors	LA	
Spin bowler
**Dane Piedt**	35	Right-handed	Right-arm off spin	Cape Cobras	FC	First-class Captain
**George Linde**	34	Left-handed	Slow left-arm orthodox	Cape Cobras	LA	
**Bjorn Fortuin**	31	Right-handed	Slow left-arm orthodox	Lions	LA	
Pace bowlers
**Beuran Hendricks**	35	Left-handed	Left-arm fast-medium	Lions	FC, LA	
Malusi Siboto	38	Left-handed	Right-arm medium	Lions	FC, LA	
**Lutho Sipamla**	27	Right-handed	Right-arm fast-medium	Warriors	FC, LA	
**Anrich Nortje**	32	Right-handed	Right-arm fast	Cape Cobras	FC, LA	
**Sisanda Magala**	35	Right-handed	Right-arm fast-medium	Warriors	LA	
**Junior Dala**	36	Right-handed	Right-arm medium	Titans	LA	

== Captains ==
South Africa A cricket captains
Number	Name	Year	Opposition	Location	Matches
1	Jimmy Cook	1993–94	England A	South Africa	1
2	Mark Rushmere	1994–95	Various	Zimbabwe	6
3	Dale Benkenstein	1995–96	Zimbabwe A	South Africa	1
3	Dale Benkenstein	1997–98	West Indies A	South Africa	6
3	Dale Benkenstein	1998	Sri Lanka A	Sri Lanka	7
3	Dale Benkenstein	1999–2000	Sri Lanka A	South Africa	5
3	Dale Benkenstein	2000	Various	West Indies	8
3	Dale Benkenstein	2001–02	Australians	South Africa	1
3	Dale Benkenstein	2002–03	Sri Lankans	Sri Lanka	1
4	John Commins	1995–96	England XI	South Africa	1
4	John Commins	1996	Various	England	10
4	John Commins	1996–97	Indians	South Africa	1
5	Gerhardus Liebenberg	1995–96	Essex	England	1
6	Nic Pothas	1998–99	West Indies	South Africa	1
7	Gerald Dros	2000	Windward Islands	West Indies	1
7	Gerald Dros	2001–02	India A	South Africa	2
7	Gerald Dros	2002–03	Australia A	Australia	5
8	Hylton Ackerman	2001–02	Indians	South Africa	1
8	Hylton Ackerman	2001–02	Kenya	South Africa	1
8	Hylton Ackerman	2001–02	India A	South Africa	2
9	Daryll Cullinan	2001–02	Australians	South Africa	1
9	Daryll Cullinan	2002–03	Pakistanis	South Africa	1
10	Neil McKenzie	2002–03	Australia A	South Africa	6
10	Neil McKenzie	2002–03	Bangladeshis	South Africa	1
10	Neil McKenzie	2002–03	Sri Lankans	South Africa	1
10	Neil McKenzie	2002–03	The Rest	South Africa	5
10	Neil McKenzie	2003–04	West Indians	South Africa	1
10	Neil McKenzie	2007–08	West Indians	South Africa	1
11	Gary Kirsten	2002–03	Pakistanis	South Africa	1
12	Graeme Smith	2002–03	Zimbabwe	Zimbabwe	3
13	Nicky Boje	2002–03	Australia A	Australia	5
14	Ashwell Prince	2003–04	Australia A	South Africa	5
14	Ashwell Prince	2004	Zimbabwe A	Zimbabwe	5
14	Ashwell Prince	2004–05	New Zealand A	South Africa	6
14	Ashwell Prince	2004–05	England XI	South Africa	1
15	Boeta Dippenaar	2004–05	England XI	South Africa	1
15	Boeta Dippenaar	2006–07	Zimbabwe Select XI	Zimbabwe	2
15	Boeta Dippenaar	2007–08	India A	India	3
15	Boeta Dippenaar	2007–08	New Zealanders	South Africa	1
16	Jacques Rudolph	2005–06	Various	Sri Lanka	4
16	Jacques Rudolph	2005–06	Triangular A Team Tournament	Sri Lanka	5
16	Jacques Rudolph	2005–06	New Zealanders	South Africa	2
17	Robin Peterson	2006–07	Zimbabwe	Zimbabwe	3
18	Ahmed Amla	2008–09	Sri Lanka A	South Africa	3
19	Alviro Petersen	2008–09	Sri Lanka A	South Africa	5
20	Justin Ontong	2009–10	England XI	South Africa	1
21	Stephen Cook	2015–16	Zimbabwe	Zimbabwe	2
22	Zubayr Hamza	2021	Zimbabwe	Zimbabwe	1

== See also ==
- South African Fezela XI
