= Zimbabwe at the Men's T20 World Cup =

ZimZambnational team performance at T20 World Cup

The Zimbabwe national cricket team is one of the full members of the International Cricket Council (ICC), the governing body of cricket. There have been nine editions of the T20 World Cup and Zimbabwe has participated in six editions. Although they had qualified for the 2009 edition, they later withdrew following pressure from England and South Africa due to political reasons.

They have never reached the knockout stage of the tournament but their best performance came in 2022 after reaching the Super 12 stage. They have an overall win–loss record of 8–11 from 20 matches.

== T20 World Cup record ==
ICC T20 World Cup record										Qualification record (Note: WCL Division One served as the qualifier for the 2007 edition. For subsequent events, only the final qualification event is considered.)				
Year	Round	Position	Pld	W	L	T	NR	Ab (Note: Abandoned matches are not counted in the official records.)	Captain	Pld	W	L	T	NR
(South Africa) 2007	Group stage	9/12	2	1	1	0	0	0	Prosper Utseya	Did not participate (qualified automatically)				
(England) 2009	Withdrew									Did not participate (qualified automatically)				
(Cricket West Indies) 2010	Group stage	11/12	2	0	2	0	0	0	Prosper Utseya	Did not participate (qualified automatically)				
(Sri Lanka) 2012	Group stage	12/12	2	0	2	0	0	0	Brendan Taylor	Did not participate (qualified automatically)				
(Bangladesh) 2014	First stage	11/16	3	2	1	0	0	0	Brendan Taylor	Did not participate (qualified automatically)				
(India) 2016	First stage	11/16	3	2	1	0	0	0	Hamilton Masakadza	Did not participate (qualified automatically)				
(United Arab Emirates) (Oman) 2021	Not eligible (suspended)									Not eligible (suspended)				
(Australia) 2022	Super 12	10/16	8	3	4	0	1	0	Craig Ervine	3	3	0	0	0
(United States) (Cricket West Indies) 2024	Did not qualify									6	4	2	0	0
(India) (Sri Lanka) 2026	Super 8	8/20	7	3	3	0	0	1	Sikandar Raza	10	10	0	0	0
(Australia) (New Zealand) 2028	Qualified									Did not participate (qualified automatically)				
Total	0 Titles	7/10	27	11	14	0	1	1	—N/a	19	17	2	0	0

=== Record by opponents ===
Opponent	M	W	L	T+W	T+L	NR	Ab	Win %	First played
Afghanistan	1	0	1	0	0	0	0	0.00	2016
Australia	2	2	0	0	0	0	0	100	2007
Bangladesh	1	0	1	0	0	0	0	0.00	2022
England	1	0	1	0	0	0	0	0.00	2007
Hong Kong	1	1	0	0	0	0	0	100	2016
India	2	0	2	0	0	0	0	0.00	2022
Ireland	3	1	1	0	0	0	1	50.00	2014
Netherlands	2	1	1	0	0	0	0	50.00	2014
New Zealand	1	0	1	0	0	0	0	0.00	2010
Oman	1	1	0	0	0	0	0	100	2026
Pakistan	1	1	0	0	0	0	0	100	2022
Scotland	2	2	0	0	0	0	0	100	2016
South Africa	3	0	2	0	0	1	0	0.00	2012
Sri Lanka	3	1	2	0	0	0	0	33.33	2010
United Arab Emirates	1	1	0	0	0	0	0	100	2014
West Indies	2	0	2	0	0	0	0	0.00	2022
Total	27	11	14	0	0	1	1	44.00	—
Source: Last Updated: 13 February 2026

== Tournament results ==
=== South Africa 2007 ===
Squad

- Prosper Utseya (c)
- Chamu Chibhabha
- Timycen Maruma
- Hamilton Masakadza
- Stuart Matsikenyeri
- Vusi Sibanda
- Tatenda Taibu (wk)
- Brendan Taylor (wk)
- Sean Williams
- Elton Chigumbura
- Keith Dabengwa
- Gary Brent
- Chris Mpofu
- Tawanda Mupariwa
- Johnson Marumisa

Results

Group stage (Group B)			Super 8s		Semifinal	Final	Overall Result
Opposition Result	Opposition Result	Rank	Opposition Result	Rank	Opposition Result	Opposition Result	Overall Result
Australia; Won by 5 wickets	England 'Lost by 50 runs	3	Did not advance				Group stage
Source: Cricinfo

Scorecards

Group stage (Group B)

12 September
18:00
(scorecard)

Australia; 138/9 (20 overs)	v	Zimbabwe; 139/5 (19.5 overs)
Brad Hodge 35 (22); Elton Chigumbura 3/20 (3 overs)		Brendan Taylor 60* (45); Stuart Clark 2/22 (4 overs)

Zimbabwe won by 5 wickets
Newlands Cricket Ground, Cape Town
Umpires: Asad Rauf (Pak) and Tony Hill (NZ)
Player of the match: Brendan Taylor (Zim)

- Australia won the toss and elected to bat.

13 September
14:00
(scorecard)

England; 188/9 (20 overs)	v	Zimbabwe; 138/7 (20 overs)
Kevin Pietersen 79 (37); Elton Chigumbura 4/31 (4 overs)		Brendan Taylor 47 (39); Dimitri Mascarenhas 3/18 (4 overs)

England won by 50 runs
Newlands Cricket Ground, Cape Town
Umpires: Asad Rauf (Pak) and Ian Howell (SA)
Player of the match: Kevin Pietersen (Eng)

- England won the toss and elected to bat.
- Luke Wright, Darren Maddy and Chris Schofield (Eng) all made their T20I debuts.

=== West Indies 2010 ===
Squad

- Prosper Utseya (c)
- Chamu Chibhabha
- Charles Coventry
- Craig Ervine
- Hamilton Masakadza
- Timycen Maruma
- Vusi Sibanda
- Tatenda Taibu (wk)
- Brendan Taylor (wk)
- Andy Blignaut
- Elton Chigumbura
- Greg Lamb
- Graeme Cremer
- Chris Mpofu
- Ray Price

Results

Group stage (Group B)			Super 8s		Semifinal	Final	Overall Result
Opposition Result	Opposition Result	Rank	Opposition Result	Rank	Opposition Result	Opposition Result	Overall Result
Sri Lanka 'Lost by 14 runs (DLS)	New Zealand 'Lost by 7 runs (DLS)	3	Did not advance				Group stage
Source: Cricinfo

Scorecards

Group stage (Group B)

3 May
09:30
Scorecard

Sri Lanka; 173/7 (20 overs)	v	Zimbabwe; 29/1 (5 overs)
Mahela Jayawardene 100 (64); Ray Price 2/31 (4 overs)		Tatenda Taibu 12* (13)

Sri Lanka won by 14 runs (D/L)
Providence Stadium, Guyana
Umpires: Billy Doctrove (WI) and Ian Gould (Eng)
Player of the match: Mahela Jayawardene (SL)

- Sri Lanka won the toss and elected to bat.
- Rain reduced Zimbabwe's innings to 5 overs. According to the Duckworth–Lewis method, their target was 44 runs.

4 May
09:30
Scorecard

Zimbabwe; 84 (15.1 overs)	v	New Zealand; 36/1 (8.1 overs)
Tatenda Taibu 21 (14); Scott Styris 3/5 (2 overs)		Brendon McCullum 22* (26); Prosper Utseya 1/21 (4 overs)

New Zealand won by 7 runs (D/L)
Providence Stadium, Guyana
Umpires: Asad Rauf (Pak) and Steve Davis (Aus)
Player of the match: Nathan McCullum (NZ)

- New Zealand won the toss and elected to field.
- Rain reduced New Zealand's innings to 8.1 overs. According to the Duckworth–Lewis method, their target was 30 runs.

=== Sri Lanka 2012 ===
Squad

- Brendan Taylor (c, wk)
- Craig Ervine
- Hamilton Masakadza
- Stuart Matsikenyeri
- Forster Mutizwa (wk)
- Vusi Sibanda
- Malcolm Waller
- Elton Chigumbura
- Richard Muzhange
- Graeme Cremer
- Kyle Jarvis
- Chris Mpofu
- Ray Price
- Prosper Utseya
- Brian Vitori

Results

Group stage (Group C)			Super 8s		Semifinal	Final	Overall Result
Opposition Result	Opposition Result	Rank	Opposition Result	Rank	Opposition Result	Opposition Result	Overall Result
Sri Lanka 'Lost by 82 runs	South Africa 'Lost by 10 wickets	3	Did not advance				Group stage
Source: Cricinfo

Scorecards

Group stage (Group C)

18 September
19:30 (D/N)
Scorecard

Sri Lanka; 182/4 (20 overs)	v	Zimbabwe; 100 (17.3 overs)
Kumar Sangakkara 44 (26); Graeme Cremer 1/27 (4 overs)		Hamilton Masakadza 20 (23); Ajantha Mendis 6/8 (4 overs)

Sri Lanka won by 82 runs
Mahinda Rajapaksa International Cricket Stadium, Sooriyawewa
Umpires: Ian Gould (Eng) and Rod Tucker (Aus)
Player of the match: Ajantha Mendis (SL)

- Zimbabwe won the toss and elected to field

20 September
19:30 (D/N)
Scorecard

Zimbabwe; 93/8 (20 overs)	v	South Africa; 94/0 (12.4 overs)
Craig Ervine 37 (40); Jacques Kallis 4/15 (4 overs)		Richard Levi 50* (43)

South Africa won by 10 wickets
Mahinda Rajapaksa International Cricket Stadium, Sooriyawewa
Umpires: Steve Davis (Aus) and Richard Kettleborough (Eng)
Player of the match: Jacques Kallis (SA)

- South Africa won the toss and elected to field
- Zimbabwe were eliminated as a result of this match.

=== Bangladesh 2014 ===
Squad

- Brendan Taylor (c, wk)
- Elton Chigumbura
- Natsai Mushangwe
- Tafadzwa Kamungozi
- Tinashe Panyangara
- Hamilton Masakadza
- Timycen Maruma
- Vusi Sibanda
- Shingi Masakadza (wk)
- Prosper Utseya
- Malcolm Waller
- Sean Williams
- Tendai Chatara
- Ray Price
- Brian Vitori

Results

First stage (Group B)				Super 10		Semifinal	Final	Overall Result
Opposition Result	Opposition Result	Opposition Result	Rank	Opposition Result	Rank	Opposition Result	Opposition Result	Overall Result
Ireland 'Lost by 3 wickets	Netherlands; Won by 5 wickets	United Arab Emirates; Won by 5 wickets	2	Did not advance				First stage
Source: Cricinfo

Scorecards

First stage (Group B)

17 March 2014
15:30
Scorecard

Zimbabwe; 163/5 (20 overs)	v	Ireland; 164/7 (20 overs)
Brendan Taylor 59 (46); George Dockrell 2/18 (4 overs)		Paul Stirling 60 (34); Tinashe Panyangara 4/37 (4 overs)

Ireland won by 3 wickets
Sylhet Divisional Stadium, Sylhet
Umpires: Steve Davis (Aus) and Marais Erasmus (SA)
Player of the match: Paul Stirling (Ire)

- Ireland won the toss and chose to field.

19 March 2014
15:30
Scorecard

Netherlands; 140/5 (20 overs)	v	Zimbabwe; 146/5 (20 overs)
Tom Cooper 72 (58); Prosper Utseya 2/24 (4 overs)		Brendan Taylor 49 (39); Pieter Seelaar 2/9 (2 overs)

Zimbabwe won by 5 wickets
Sylhet Divisional Stadium, Sylhet
Umpires: Steve Davis (Aus) and Bruce Oxenford (Aus)
Player of the match: Brendan Taylor (Zim)

- Netherlands won the toss and elected to bat.

21 March 2014
11:30
Scorecard

United Arab Emirates; 116/9 (20 overs)	v	Zimbabwe; 118/5 (13.4 overs)
Swapnil Patil 30 (26); Sean Williams 3/15 (4 overs)		Elton Chigumbura 53* (21); Manjula Guruge 2/18 (4 overs)

Zimbabwe won by 5 wickets
Sylhet Divisional Stadium, Sylhet
Umpires: Billy Bowden (NZ) and Bruce Oxenford (Aus)
Player of the match: Elton Chigumbura (Zim)

- Zimbabwe won the toss and elected to field

=== India 2016 ===
Squad

- Hamilton Masakadza (c)
- Sean Williams (vc)
- Chamu Chibhabha
- Graeme Cremer
- Malcolm Waller
- Vusi Sibanda
- Peter Moor (wk)
- Richmond Mutumbami (wk)
- Elton Chigumbura
- Sikandar Raza
- Luke Jongwe
- Neville Madziva
- Tendai Chatara
- Tendai Chisoro
- Wellington Masakadza
- Tinashe Panyangara
- Donald Tiripano

Results

First stage (Group B)				Super 10		Semifinal	Final	Overall Result
Opposition Result	Opposition Result	Opposition Result	Rank	Opposition Result	Rank	Opposition Result	Opposition Result	Overall Result
Hong Kong; Won by 14 runs	Scotland; Won by 11 runs	Afghanistan 'Lost by 59 runs	2	Did not advance				First stage
Source: Cricinfo

Scorecards

First stage (Group B)

8 March 2016
15:00 (D/N)
Scorecard

Zimbabwe; 158/8 (20 overs)	v	Hong Kong; 144/6 (20 overs)
Vusi Sibanda 59 (46); Tanwir Afzal 2/19 (4 overs)		Jamie Atkinson 53 (44); Donald Tiripano 2/27 (4 overs)

Zimbabwe won by 14 runs
Vidarbha Cricket Association Stadium, Nagpur
Umpires: Aleem Dar (Pak) and Ian Gould (Eng)
Player of the match: Vusi Sibanda (Zim)

- Hong Kong won the toss and elected to field.

10 March 2016
15:00 (D/N)
Scorecard

Zimbabwe; 147/7 (20 overs)	v	Scotland; 136 (19.4 overs)
Sean Williams 53 (36); Mark Watt 2/21 (4 overs)		Richie Berrington 36 (39); Wellington Masakadza 4/28 (4 overs)

Zimbabwe won by 11 runs
Vidarbha Cricket Association Stadium, Nagpur
Umpires: Aleem Dar (Pak) and Marais Erasmus (SA)
Player of the match: Wellington Masakadza (Zim)

- Zimbabwe won the toss and elected to bat.

12 March 2016
15:00 (D/N)
Scorecard

Afghanistan; 186/6 (20 overs)	v	Zimbabwe; 127 (19.4 overs)
Mohammad Nabi 52 (32); Tinashe Panyangara 3/32 (4 overs)		Tinashe Panyangara 17* (7); Rashid Khan 3/11 (4 overs)

Afghanistan won by 59 runs
Vidarbha Cricket Association Stadium, Nagpur
Umpires: Aleem Dar (Pak) and Richard Illingworth (Eng)
Player of the match: Mohammad Nabi (Afg)

- Afghanistan won the toss and elected to bat.

=== Australia 2022 ===
Squad and kit

- Craig Ervine (c)
- Ryan Burl
- Regis Chakabva (wk)
- Tendai Chatara
- Bradley Evans
- Luke Jongwe
- Clive Madande (wk)
- Wesley Madhevere
- Wellington Masakadza
- Tony Munyonga
- Blessing Muzarabani
- Richard Ngarava
- Sikandar Raza
- Milton Shumba
- Sean Williams

2022 kit

Results

First stage (Group B)				Super 12 (Group 2)						Semifinal	Final	Overall Result
Opposition Result	Opposition Result	Opposition Result	Rank	Opposition Result	Opposition Result	Opposition Result	Opposition Result	Opposition Result	Rank	Opposition Result	Opposition Result	Overall Result
Ireland; Won by 31 runs	West Indies 'Lost by 31 runs	Scotland; Won by 5 wickets	2	South Africa; No result	Pakistan; Won by 1 run	Bangladesh 'Lost by 3 runs	Netherlands 'Lost by 5 wickets	India 'Lost by 71 runs	6	Did not advance		Super 12
Source: Cricinfo

Scorecards

First stage (Group B)

17 October 2022
19:00 (N)
Scorecard

Zimbabwe; 174/7 (20 overs)	v	Ireland; 143/9 (20 overs)
Sikandar Raza 82 (48); Josh Little 3/24 (4 overs)		Curtis Campher 27 (22); Blessing Muzarabani 3/23 (4 overs)

Zimbabwe won by 31 runs
Bellerive Oval, Hobart
Umpires: Chris Brown (NZ) and Kumar Dharmasena (SL)
Player of the match: Sikandar Raza (Zim)

- Ireland won the toss and elected to field.

19 October 2022
19:00 (N)
Scorecard

West Indies; 153/7 (20 overs)	v	Zimbabwe; 122 (18.2 overs)
Johnson Charles 45 (36); Sikandar Raza 3/19 (4 overs)		Luke Jongwe 29 (22); Alzarri Joseph 4/16 (4 overs)

West Indies won by 31 runs
Bellerive Oval, Hobart
Umpires: Aleem Dar (Pak) and Paul Wilson (Aus)
Player of the match: Alzarri Joseph (WI)

- West Indies won the toss and elected to bat.

21 October 2022
19:00 (N)
Scorecard

Scotland; 132/6 (20 overs)	v	Zimbabwe; 133/5 (18.3 overs)
George Munsey 54 (51); Tendai Chatara 2/14 (4 overs)		Craig Ervine 58 (54); Josh Davey 2/16 (3 overs)

Zimbabwe won by 5 wickets
Bellerive Oval, Hobart
Umpires: Michael Gough (Eng) and Nitin Menon (Ind)
Player of the match: Sikandar Raza (Zim)

- Scotland won the toss and elected to bat.
- Zimbabwe qualified for the Super 12 as a result of this match.

Super 12 (Group 2)

24 October 2022
19:00 (N)
Scorecard

Zimbabwe; 79/5 (9 overs)	v	South Africa; 51/0 (3 overs)
Wesley Madhevere 35* (18); Lungi Ngidi 2/20 (2 overs)		Quinton de Kock 47* (18)

No result
Bellerive Oval, Hobart
Umpires: Michael Gough (Eng) and Ahsan Raza (Pak)

- Zimbabwe won the toss and elected to bat.
- The match was reduced to 9 overs per side due to rain.
- South Africa were set a revised target of 64 runs in 7 overs due to rain.
- Rain during South Africa's innings prevented any further play.

27 October 2022
19:00 (N)
Scorecard

Zimbabwe; 130/8 (20 overs)	v	Pakistan; 129/8 (20 overs)
Sean Williams 31 (28); Mohammad Wasim 4/24 (4 overs)		Shan Masood 44 (38); Sikandar Raza 3/25 (4 overs)

Zimbabwe won by 1 run
Perth Stadium, Perth
Umpires: Chris Gaffaney (NZ) and Richard Kettleborough (Eng)
Player of the match: Sikandar Raza (Zim)

- Zimbabwe won the toss and elected to bat.
- This was Zimbabwe's first win over Pakistan in an ICC Tournament.

30 October 2022
13:00
Scorecard

Bangladesh; 150/7 (20 overs)	v	Zimbabwe; 147/8 (20 overs)
Najmul Hossain Shanto 71 (55); Blessing Muzarabani 2/13 (2 overs)		Sean Williams 64 (42); Taskin Ahmed 3/19 (4 overs)

Bangladesh won by 3 runs
The Gabba, Brisbane
Umpires: Marais Erasmus (SA) and Nitin Menon (Ind)
Player of the match: Taskin Ahmed (Ban)

- Bangladesh won the toss and elected to bat.

2 November 2022
14:30
Scorecard

Zimbabwe; 117 (19.2 overs)	v	Netherlands; 120/5 (18 overs)
Sikandar Raza 40 (24); Paul van Meekeren 3/29 (4 overs)		Max O'Dowd 52 (47); Richard Ngarava 2/18 (4 overs)

Netherlands won by 5 wickets
Adelaide Oval, Adelaide
Umpires: Adrian Holdstock (SA) and Richard Illingworth (Eng)
Player of the match: Max O'Dowd (Ned)

- Zimbabwe won the toss and elected to bat.

6 November 2022
19:00 (N)
Scorecard

India; 186/5 (20 overs)	v	Zimbabwe; 115 (17.2 overs)
Suryakumar Yadav 61* (25); Sean Williams 2/9 (2 overs)		Ryan Burl 35 (22); Ravichandran Ashwin 3/22 (4 overs)

India won by 71 runs
Melbourne Cricket Ground, Melbourne
Umpires: Richard Kettleborough (Eng) and Rod Tucker (Aus)
Player of the match: Suryakumar Yadav (Ind)

- India won the toss and elected to bat.

=== India & Sri Lanka 2026 ===
Squad and kit

- Sikandar Raza (c)
- Brendan Taylor (wk)
- Dion Myers
- Wellington Masakadza
- Tashinga Musekiwa
- Graeme Cremer
- Tony Munyonga
- Richard Ngarava
- Blessing Muzarabani
- Clive Madande (wk)
- Tadiwanashe Marumani (wk)
- Ryan Burl
- Tinotenda Maposa
- Brad Evans
- Brian Bennett

2026 kit

Results

Group stage (Group B)					Super 8 (Group 1)				Semifinal	Final	Overall Result
Opposition Result	Opposition Result	Opposition Result	Opposition Result	Rank	Opposition Result	Opposition Result	Opposition Result	Rank	Opposition Result	Opposition Result	Overall Result
Oman; Won by 8 wickets	Australia; Won by 23 runs	Ireland; Match abandoned	Sri Lanka; Won by 6 wickets	1	West Indies; Lost by 107 runs	India; Lost by 72 runs	South Africa; Lost by 5 wickets	4	Did not advance		Super 8
Source: Cricinfo

Scorecards

Group stage (Group B)

Match 8
9 February 2026
15:00 UTC+5:30 (D/N)
Scorecard

Oman; 103 (19.5 overs)	v	Zimbabwe; 106/2 (13.3 overs)
Vinayak Shukla 28 (21); Blessing Muzarabani 3/16 (4 overs)		Brian Bennett 48* (36); Sufyan Mehmood 2/12 (3 overs)

Zimbabwe won by 8 wickets
Sinhalese Sports Club Cricket Ground, Colombo
Umpires: Wayne Knights (NZ) and Asif Yaqoob (Pak)
Player of the match: Blessing Muzarabani (Zim)

- Zimbabwe won the toss and elected to field.
- This was the first time Oman and Zimbabwe faced each other in T20Is.

Match 19
13 February 2026
11:00 UTC+5:30
Scorecard

Zimbabwe; 169/2 (20 overs)	v	Australia; 146 (19.3 overs)
Brian Bennett 64* (56); Cameron Green 1/6 (1.1 overs)		Matt Renshaw 65 (44); Blessing Muzarabani 4/17 (4 overs)

Zimbabwe won by 23 runs
R. Premadasa Stadium, Colombo
Umpires: Chris Gaffaney (NZ) and Raveendra Wimalasiri (SL)
Player of the match: Blessing Muzarabani (Zim)

- Australia won the toss and elected to field.
- Blessing Muzarabani became the third player for Zimbabwe to take 100 wickets in T20Is.

Match 32
17 February 2026
15:00 UTC+5:30 (D/N)
Scorecard

Ireland	v	Zimbabwe

Match abandoned
Pallekele International Cricket Stadium, Kandy
Umpires: Ahsan Raza (Pak) and Asif Yaqoob (Pak)

- No toss.
- No play was possible due to rain.
- Zimbabwe qualified for the Super 8 while Australia and Ireland were eliminated as a result of this match.

Match 38
19 February 2026
15:00 UTC+5:30 (D/N)
Scorecard

Sri Lanka; 178/7 (20 overs)	v	Zimbabwe; 182/4 (19.3 overs)
Pathum Nissanka 62 (41); Graeme Cremer 2/27 (4 overs)		Brian Bennett 63* (48); Dushan Hemantha 2/36 (4 overs)

Zimbabwe won by 6 wickets
R. Premadasa Stadium, Colombo
Umpires: Richard Kettleborough (Eng) and Asif Yaqoob (Pak)
Player of the match: Sikandar Raza (Zim)

- Sri Lanka won the toss and elected to bat.

Super 8 (Group 2)

Match 44
23 February 2026
19:00 UTC+5:30 (N)
Scorecard

West Indies; 254/6 (20 overs)	v	Zimbabwe; 147 (17.4 overs)
Shimron Hetmyer 85 (34); Blessing Muzarabani 2/42 (4 overs)		Brad Evans 43 (21); Gudakesh Motie 4/28 (4 overs)

West Indies won by 107 runs
Wankhede Stadium, Mumbai
Attendance: 19,199
Umpires: Richard Illingworth (Eng) and Jayaraman Madanagopal (Ind)
Player of the match: Shimron Hetmyer (WI)

- Zimbabwe won the toss and elected to field.
- Shimron Hetmyer (WI) scored the fastest half-century (19 balls) for West Indies in T20Is.
- West Indies recorded the second highest total in the T20 World Cup.
- Brad Evans and Richard Ngarava (Zim) recorded the highest partnership for the 10th wicket in the T20 World Cup.

Match 48
26 February 2026
19:00 UTC+5:30 (N)
Scorecard

India; 256/4 (20 overs)	v	Zimbabwe; 184/6 (20 overs)
Abhishek Sharma 55 (30); Sikandar Raza 1/29 (3 overs)		Brian Bennett 97* (59); Arshdeep Singh 3/24 (4 overs)

India won by 72 runs
M. A. Chidambaram Stadium, Chennai
Umpires: Richard Kettleborough (Eng) and Alex Wharf (Eng)
Player of the match: Hardik Pandya (Ind)

- Zimbabwe won the toss and elected to field.
- Suryakumar Yadav (Ind) completed 4,000 international runs during the match.
- India recorded their highest total and the second highest total by any team in the T20 World Cup.
- South Africa qualified for their second consecutive and overall fourth T20 World Cup semi-final while Zimbabwe were eliminated as a result of this match.

Match 51
1 March 2026
15:00 UTC+5:30 (D/N)
Scorecard

Zimbabwe; 153/7 (20 overs)	v	South Africa; 154/5 (17.5 overs)
Sikandar Raza 73 (43); Kwena Maphaka 2/21 (4 overs)		Dewald Brevis 42 (18); Sikandar Raza 3/29 (4 overs)

South Africa won by 5 wickets
Arun Jaitley Stadium, Delhi
Umpires: Kumar Dharmasena (SL) and Richard Illingworth (Eng)
Player of the match: Sikandar Raza (Zim)

- Zimbabwe won the toss and elected to bat.
- Lungi Ngidi became the first South African cricketer to take 90 wickets in T20Is.

== Records and statistics ==
=== Team records ===
Highest innings totals

Score	Opponent	Venue	Season
174/7 (20 overs)	Ireland	Hobart	2022
169/2 (20 overs)	Australia	Colombo	2026
163/5 (20 overs)	Ireland	Sylhet	2014
158/8 (20 overs)	Hong Kong	Nagpur	2016
147/7 (20 overs)	Scotland	Nagpur	2016
147/8 (20 overs)	Bangladesh	Brisbane	2022
Last updated: 13 February 2026

=== Most appearances ===
This list consists players with most number of matches at the T20 World Cup. Craig Ervine has played a total of 11 matches, and has captained the team in 7 of their World Cup matches.

Matches	Player	Period
14	Sikandar Raza	2014-2022
14	Sean Williams	2014-2022
13	Tendai Chatara	2014-2022
12	Elton Chigumbura	2007-2016
12	Hamilton Masakadza	2007-2016
Last updated: 6 November 2022

=== Batting statistics ===
Most runs

Runs	Player	Mat	Inn	HS	Avg	100s	50s	Period
278	Sikandar Raza	14	14	82	19.85	—N/a	1	2014–2022
275	Sean Williams	14	14	64	19.64	—N/a	2	2014–2022
245	Brendan Taylor	8	8	60*	40.83	—N/a	2	2007–2014
213	Hamilton Masakadza	12	12	43	17.75	—N/a	—N/a	2007–2016
180	Vusi Sibanda	10	10	59	20.00	—N/a	1	2007–2016
Last updated: 6 November 2022

Highest partnerships

Runs	Players	Opposition	Venue	Season
74 (1st wicket)	Brendan Taylor (41) & Vusi Sibanda (29)	v England	Cape Town	2007
64 (4th wicket)	Sikandar Raza (40) & Craig Ervine (23)	v Scotland	Hobart	2022
63 (6th wicket)	Sean Williams (36) & Ryan Burl (26)	v Bangladesh	Brisbane	2022
62 (2nd wicket)	Brendan Taylor (32) & Hamilton Masakadza (26)	v Netherlands	Sylhet	2014
61 (5th wicket)	Malcolm Waller (26) & Vusi Sibanda (32)	v Hong Kong	Nagpur	2016
Last updated: 6 November 2022

=== Bowling statistics ===
Most wickets

Wickets	Player	Matches	Avg.	Econ.	BBI	4W	5W	Period
13	Sikandar Raza	14	16.53	6.51	3/19	0	0	2014–2022
12	Blessing Muzarabani	8	16.58	7.65	3/23	0	0	2022–2022
11	Sean Williams	14	21.45	6.05	3/15	0	0	2014–2022
11	Tendai Chatara	13	26.90	6.72	2/14	0	0	2014–2022
9	Tinashe Panyangara	6	19.66	7.69	4/37	1	0	2014–2016
9	Richard Ngarava	8	21.88	7.03	2/18	0	0	2022–2022
Last updated: 6 November 2022
