= Kenyan cricket team in Zimbabwe in 2009–10 =

Kenyan cricket team in Zimbabwe in 2009
	Zimbabwe	Kenya
- Dates: 7 – 18 October 2009
Captains	Prosper Utseya	Morris Ouma

One Day International series
- Results: Zimbabwe won the 5-match series 4–1
Most runs	Hamilton Masakadza (467)	David Obuya (197)
Most wickets	Prosper Utseya (11)	Nehemiah Odhiambo (12)
- Player of the series: Hamilton Masakadza (Zim)

The Kenyan cricket team toured Zimbabwe from 7 to 18 October 2009. They played five One Day Internationals (ODIs) against the full Zimbabwe team and an Intercontinental Cup match against a Zimbabwe XI. Zimbabwe won the ODI series 4–1. The only win of the tour for Kenya came in the third ODI, which the visitors won by 20 runs.

== Squads ==
Zimbabwe	Kenya
Prosper Utseya (c); Elton Chigumbura; Charles Coventry; Graeme Cremer; Trevor Garwe; Kyle Jarvis; Ray Price; Hamilton Masakadza; Stuart Matsikenyeri; Chris Mpofu; Forster Mutizwa; Brendan Taylor; Mark Vermeulen; Malcolm Waller; Sean Williams	Maurice Ouma (c); Rageb Aga; Steve Tikolo; David Obuya; Rakep Patel; Alex Obanda; Collins Obuya; Nehemiah Odhiambo; Thomas Odoyo; Jimmy Kamande; Elijah Otieno; Lameck Onyango; Alfred Luseno; Peter Ongondo; Hiren Varaiya

== Intercontinental Cup Match ==
7–10 October
Scorecard

Kenya	v	Zimbabwe XI
333 (92.3 overs); Steve Tikolo 61 (96); Timycen Maruma 3/82 (24 overs)		352 (103.5 overs); Vusi Sibanda 209 (320); Thomas Odoyo 3/38 (19 overs)
254 (74.3 overs); Morris Ouma 54 (115); Ed Rainsford 3/39 (13 overs)		238/5 (62.5 overs); Vusi Sibanda 116* (172); Thomas Odoyo 1/18 (6 overs)

Zimbabwe XI won by 5 wickets
Kwekwe Sports Club, Kwekwe, Zimbabwe
Umpires: Owen Chirombe (Zim) and Nadir Shah (Ban)

- Zimbabwe XI won the toss and elected to field.
- Kyle Jarvis (Zimbabwe XI) made his first-class debut.
- Points: Zimbabwe 20, Kenya 0

== ODI series ==
=== 1st ODI ===
12 October
09:30
Scorecard

Zimbabwe; 313/4 (50 overs)	v	Kenya; 222 (49.5 overs)
Hamilton Masakadza 156 (151); Nehemiah Odhiambo 2/45 (10 overs)		Steve Tikolo 49 (58); Kyle Jarvis 3/36 (7 overs); Prosper Utseya 3/36 (10 overs)

Zimbabwe won by 91 runs
Harare Sports Club, Harare, Zimbabwe
Umpires: Kevan Barbour (Zim) and Nadir Shah (Ban)
Player of the match: Hamilton Masakadza (Zim)

- Zimbabwe won the toss and elected to bat.
- Kyle Jarvis (Zim) made his ODI debut.
- Lameck Onyango conceded 91 runs, the most by a Kenya bowler in an ODI.

=== 2nd ODI ===
13 October
09:30
Scorecard

Zimbabwe; 263/7 (50 overs)	v	Kenya; 177 (44.5 overs)
Stuart Matsikenyeri 71* (70); Hiren Varaiya 3/38 (10 overs)		David Obuya 49 (51); Graeme Cremer 6/46 (10 overs)

Zimbabwe won by 86 runs
Harare Sports Club, Harare, Zimbabwe
Umpires: Kevan Barbour (Zim) and Nadir Shah (Ban)
Player of the match: Graeme Cremer (Zim)

- Zimbabwe won the toss and elected to bat.

=== 3rd ODI ===
15 October
09:30
Scorecard

Kenya; 266/9 (50 overs)	v	Zimbabwe; 246 (49.5 overs)
Alex Obanda 65 (73); Ray Price 2/22 (9 overs)		Brendan Taylor 92 (109); Nehemiah Odhiambo 4/61 (9.5 overs)

Kenya won by 20 runs
Harare Sports Club, Harare, Zimbabwe
Umpires: Kevan Barbour (Zim) and Nadir Shah (Ban)
Player of the match: Nehemiah Odhiambo (Ken)

- Kenya won the toss and elected to bat.

=== 4th ODI ===
17 October
09:30
Scorecard

Kenya; 270/8 (50 overs)	v	Zimbabwe; 271/4 (48 overs)
Morris Ouma 58 (58); Prosper Utseya 4/46 (10 overs)		Forster Mutizwa 79(97); Nehemiah Odhiambo 2/46 (9 overs)

Zimbabwe won by 6 wickets
Harare Sports Club, Harare, Zimbabwe
Umpires: Kevan Barbour (Zim) and Nadir Shah (Ban)
Player of the match: Forster Mutizwa (Zim)

- Kenya won the toss and elected to bat.

=== 5th ODI ===
18 October
09:30
Scorecard

Zimbabwe; 329/3 (50 overs)	v	Kenya; 187 (39.3 overs)
Hamilton Masakadza 178* (167); Nehemiah Odhiambo 2/56 (8 overs)		Jimmy Kamande 37 (63); Chris Mpofu 3/44 (7 overs)

Zimbabwe won by 142 runs
Harare Sports Club, Harare, Zimbabwe
Umpires: Kevan Barbour (Zim) and Nadir Shah (Ban)
Player of the match: Hamilton Masakadza (Zim)

- Zimbabwe won the toss and elected to bat.
- Trevor Garwe (Zim) made his ODI debut.
