= Bangladeshi cricket team in Zimbabwe in 2013 =

International cricket tour

Bangladesh cricket team in Zimbabwe in 2013
	Zimbabwe	Bangladesh
- Dates: 17 April 2013 – 12 May 2013
Captains	Brendan Taylor	Mushfiqur Rahim

Test series
- Result: 2-match series drawn 1–1
Most runs	Brendan Taylor (319)	Nasir Hossain (174)
Most wickets	Shingi Masakadza (10)	Robiul Islam (15)
- Player of the series: Robiul Islam (Bangladesh)

One Day International series
- Results: Zimbabwe won the 3-match series 2–1
Most runs	Vusi Sibanda (152)	Nasir Hossain (167)
Most wickets	Tendai Chatara (6)	Ziaur Rahman (7)
- Player of the series: Vusi Sibanda (Zimbabwe)

Twenty20 International series
- Results: 2-match series drawn 1–1
Most runs	Hamilton Masakadza (61)	Shakib Al Hasan (105)
Most wickets	Prosper Utseya (4); Tinashe Panyangara (4)	Shakib Al Hasan (6)
- Player of the series: Shakib Al Hasan (Bangladesh)

The Bangladesh national cricket team toured Zimbabwe from 17 April 2013 to 12 May 2013. The tour consisted of two Test matches, three One Day Internationals and two Twenty20 International matches. Both test matches were played at the Harare Sports Club, Harare while the limited overs matches was played at the Queens Sports Club, Bulawayo.

== Squads ==
Tests		ODIs		T20Is	
Zimbabwe	Bangladesh	Zimbabwe	Bangladesh	Zimbabwe	Bangladesh
Brendan Taylor (c); Regis Chakabva; Tendai Chatara; Elton Chigumbura; Michael Chinouya; Graeme Cremer; Kyle Jarvis; Hamilton Masakadza; Shingi Masakadza; Keegan Meth; Natsai M'shangwe; Tinotenda Mutombodzi; Richmond Mutumbami; Ray Price; Vusi Sibanda; Sikandar Raza; Prosper Utseya; Brian Vitori; Malcolm Waller; Sean Williams	Mushfiqur Rahim (c); Enamul Haque Jr.; Jahurul Islam; Mahmudullah; Mohammad Ashraful; Mominul Haque; Nasir Hossain; Robiul Islam; Rubel Hossain; Sajidul Islam; Shafiul Islam; Shahadat Hossain; Shahriar Nafees; Shakib Al Hasan; Sohag Gazi; Tamim Iqbal; Ziaur Rahman	Brendan Taylor (c); Regis Chakabva; Tendai Chatara; Elton Chigumbura; Michael Chinouya; Kyle Jarvis; Timycen Maruma; Hamilton Masakadza; Shingi Masakadza; Natsai M'shangwe; Tinotenda Mutombodzi; Tinashe Panyangara; Vusi Sibanda; Sikandar Raza; Prosper Utseya; Brian Vitori; Malcolm Waller; Sean Williams	Mushfiqur Rahim (c); Jahurul Islam; Mahmudullah; Mohammad Ashraful; Mominul Haque; Nasir Hossain; Robiul Islam; Sajidul Islam; Shafiul Islam; Shakib Al Hasan; Sohag Gazi; Tamim Iqbal; Ziaur Rahman; Abdur Razzak; Shamsur Rahman	Brendan Taylor; Tendai Chatara; Kyle Jarvis; Timycen Maruma; Hamilton Masakadza; Shingi Masakadza; Natsai M'shangwe; Tinotenda Mutombodzi; Tinashe Panyangara; Vusi Sibanda; Sikandar Raza; Prosper Utseya; Brian Vitori; Malcolm Waller; Sean Williams	Mushfiqur Rahim (c); Jahurul Islam; Mahmudullah; Mohammad Ashraful; Mominul Haque; Nasir Hossain; Robiul Islam; Sajidul Islam; Shafiul Islam; Shakib Al Hasan; Sohag Gazi; Tamim Iqbal; Ziaur Rahman; Abdur Razzak; Shamsur Rahman

Due to injuries, Rubel Hossain and Shahadat Hossain were replaced by Shafiul Islam and Ziaur Rahman for the second Test. Rubel Hossain was withdrawn from the ODI and T20 matches due to illness.

== Test series ==
=== 1st Test ===
17–21 April
Scorecard

Zimbabwe	v	Bangladesh
389 (152.3 overs); Brendan Taylor 171 (324); Robiul Islam 3/84 (38 overs)		134 (54.1 overs); Jahurul Islam 43 (113); Shingirai Masakadza 4/32 (14.1 overs)
227/7 dec (64 overs); Brendan Taylor 102* (146); Robiul Islam 6/71 (19 overs)		147 (49.2 overs); Mohammad Ashraful 40 (105); Graeme Cremer 4/4 (5.2 overs)

Zimbabwe won by 335 runs
Harare Sports Club, Harare
Umpires: Billy Bowden (NZ) and Tony Hill (NZ)
Player of the match: Brendan Taylor (ZIM)

- Bangladesh won the toss and elected to field.
- Timycen Maruma, Keegan Meth, and Richmond Mutumbami (Zimbabwe) made their Test debuts.

=== 2nd Test ===
25–29 April
Scorecard

Bangladesh	v	Zimbabwe
391 (113.2 overs); Shakib Al Hasan 81 (118); Elton Chigumbura 3/75 (24.2 overs)		282 (96 overs); Elton Chigumbura 86 (111); Robiul Islam 5/85 (33 overs)
291/9d (88 overs); Mushfiqur Rahim 93 (153); Shingirai Masakadza 4/58 (24 overs)		257 (95.3 overs); Hamilton Masakadza 111* (252); Ziaur Rahman 4/63 (23 overs)

Bangladesh won by 143 runs
Harare Sports Club, Harare
Umpires: Ian Gould (ENG) and Tony Hill (NZ)
Player of the match: Mushfiqur Rahim (Bangladesh)

- Zimbabwe won the toss and elected to field
- Ziaur Rahman (Bangladesh) made his Test debut.

== ODI series ==
=== 1st ODI ===
3 May
9:00
Scorecard

Bangladesh; 269/8 (50 overs)	v	Zimbabwe; 148 (32.1 overs)
Nasir Hossain 68 (67); Shingi Masakadza 4/51 (10 overs)		Hamilton Masakadza 38 (53); Ziaur Rahman 5/30 (9 overs)

Bangladesh won by 121 runs
Queens Sports Club, Bulawayo
Umpires: Johan Cloete (South Africa) and Russell Tiffin (Zimbabwe)
Player of the match: Ziaur Rahman (Bangladesh)

- Zimbabwe won the toss and elected to field.
- Robiul Islam (Bangladesh) and Sikandar Raza (Zimbabwe) made their ODI debuts.

=== 2nd ODI ===
5 May
9:00
Scorecard

Bangladesh; 252/9 (50 overs)	v	Zimbabwe; 253/4 (47.5 overs)
Abdur Razzak 53* (22); Elton Chigumbura 3/39 (10 overs)		Sean Williams 78* (75); Shafiul Islam 2/51 (9 overs)

Zimbabwe won by 6 wickets
Queens Sports Club, Bulawayo
Umpires: Owen Chirombe (Zim) and Johan Cloete (RSA)
Player of the match: Sean Williams (Zimbabwe)

- Zimbabwe won the toss and elected to field

=== 3rd ODI ===
8 May
9:00
Scorecard

Bangladesh; 247/9 (50 overs)	v	Zimbabwe; 251/3 (47.1 overs)
Mahmudullah 75* (73); Brian Vitori 2/43 (9 overs)		Vusi Sibanda 103* (135); Ziaur Rahman 1/25 (5 overs)

Zimbabwe won by 7 wickets
Queens Sports Club, Bulawayo
Umpires: Johan Cloete (South Africa) and Jeremiah Matibiri (Zimbabwe)
Player of the match: Vusi Sibanda (Zimbabwe)

- Zimbabwe won the toss elected to field.

== Twenty20 Series ==
=== 1st Twenty20 ===
11 May
13:30
Scorecard

Zimbabwe; 168/5 (20 overs)	v	Bangladesh; 162/8 (20 overs)
Hamilton Masakadza 59 (48); Shakib Al Hasan 2/20 (4 overs)		Shakib Al Hasan 65 (40); Tinashe Panyangara 3/32 (4 overs)

Zimbabwe won by 6 runs
Queens Sports Club, Bulawayo
Umpires: Owen Chirombe (Zim) and Russell Tiffin (Zim)
Player of the match: Hamilton Masakadza (Zimbabwe)

- Zimbabwe won the toss and elected to bat.
- Sajidul Islam (Bangladesh), Tinashe Panyangara, and Sikandar Raza (Zimbabwe) made their T20I debuts.

=== 2nd Twenty20 ===
12 May
13:30
Scorecard

Bangladesh; 168/7 (20 overs)	v	Zimbabwe; 134/9 (20 overs)
Tamim Iqbal 43 (30); Prosper Utseya 2/15 (4 overs)		Vusi Sibanda 32 (19); Shakib Al Hasan 4/21 (4 overs)

Bangladesh won by 34 runs
Queens Sports Club, Bulawayo
Umpires: Owen Chirombe (Zim) and Jeremiah Matibiri (Zim)
Player of the match: Shakib Al Hasan (Bangladesh)

- Bangladesh won the toss and elected to bat.
- Robiul Islam (Bangladesh) made his T20I debut.
