= Zimbabwean cricket team in South Africa in 2009–10 =

	South Africa	Zimbabwe
- Dates: 8 November – 10 November 2009
Captains	Graeme Smith	Prosper Utseya

One Day International series
- Results: South Africa won the 2-match series 2–0
Most runs	JP Duminy (111)	Tatenda Taibu (155)
Most wickets	Roelof van der Merwe (3)	Ray Price (6)
- Player of the series: Tatenda Taibu (Zim)

The Zimbabwe national cricket team toured South Africa for a two-match ODI series from 8 to 10 November 2009.

== Squads ==
Zimbabwe
Batsmen: Chamu Chibhabha; Charles Coventry; Hamilton Masakadza; Forster Mutizwa; Mark Vermeulen; Malcolm Waller; All-rounders: Prosper Utseya (captain); Elton Chigumbura; Stuart Matsikenyeri	Wicket-keepers: Tatenda Taibu; Brendan Taylor; Bowlers: Graeme Cremer; Kyle Jarvis; Chris Mpofu; Ray Price

South Africa
Batsmen: Graeme Smith (captain); Hashim Amla; AB de Villiers; JP Duminy; Alviro Petersen; All-rounders: Johan Botha; Jacques Kallis; Ryan McLaren; Albie Morkel	Wicket-keepers: Mark Boucher; Bowlers: Charl Langeveldt; Roelof van der Merwe; Wayne Parnell; Dale Steyn; Lonwabo Tsotsobe

== ODI series ==
=== 1st ODI ===
8 November 2009
Scorecard

South Africa; 295/5 (50 overs)	v	Zimbabwe; 250/6 (50 overs)
HM Amla 80 (96); RW Price 3/44 [10]		T Taibu 103* (112); R McLaren 3/51 [10]

South Africa won by 45 runs
Willowmoore Park, Benoni
Umpires: HDPK Dharmasena (SL) and RE Koertzen (SA)
Player of the match: T Taibu (Zim)

- Ryan McLaren (SA) made his ODI debut.

=== 2nd ODI ===
10 November 2009
day/night
Scorecard

South Africa; 331/5 (50 overs)	v	Zimbabwe; 119 (34.3 overs)
JP Duminy 111* (87); RW Price 3/55 [10]		T Taibu 52 (71); JA Morkel 3/20 [6]

South Africa won by 212 runs
Centurion, Gauteng
Umpires: JD Cloete (SA) and HDPK Dharmasena (SL)
Player of the match: JP Duminy (SA)
