= Bangladeshi cricket team in Zimbabwe in 2011 =

Bangladesh cricket team in Zimbabwe in 2011
	Zimbabwe	Bangladesh
- Dates: 4 August – 21 August 2011
Captains	Brendan Taylor	Shakib Al Hasan

Test series
- Result: Zimbabwe won the one-match series 1–0
Most runs	Brendan Taylor (176)	Mohammad Ashraful (112)
Most wickets	Kyle Jarvis (5); Chris Mpofu (5); Brian Vitori (5)	Rubel Hossain (3); Shakib Al Hasan (3)
- Player of the series: (Zimbabwe) Brendan Taylor

One Day International series
- Results: Zimbabwe won the five-match series 3–2
Most runs	Vusi Sibanda (242)	Shakib Al Hasan (216)
Most wickets	Brian Vitori (11)	Rubel Hossain (11)
- Player of the series: (Zimbabwe) Brian Vitori

The Bangladesh cricket team toured Zimbabwe from 4 to 21 August 2011. The tour consisted of one Test match and five One Day Internationals (ODIs) played against the Zimbabwean national team and one first-class match played against a Zimbabwean representative team. The Test match was Zimbabwe's first since India toured Zimbabwe in 2005. Zimbabwe won the Test match by 130 runs and also won the one-day series 3–2.

== Squads ==
Bangladesh announced its squad for the Test match and ODI series on 15 July 2011. Zimbabwe announced its squad for the Test match and ODI series on 1 August 2011:

Zimbabwe (Test and ODI)	Bangladesh (Test and ODI)
Brendan Taylor (c); Regis Chakabva; Elton Chigumbura; Craig Ervine; Kyle Jarvis; Hamilton Masakadza; Tino Mawoyo; Keegan Meth; Chris Mpofu; Ray Price; Vusi Sibanda; Tatenda Taibu (wk); Prosper Utseya; Brian Vitori	Shakib Al Hasan (c); Tamim Iqbal (vc); Abdur Razzak; Imrul Kayes; Junaid Siddique; Mahmudullah; Mohammad Ashraful; Mushfiqur Rahim (wk); Nasir Hossain; Nazmul Hossain; Robiul Islam; Rubel Hossain; Shafiul Islam; Shahriar Nafees; Shuvagoto Hom

== Tour matches ==
=== Zimbabwe XI vs Bangladeshis (3-day match) ===
30, 31 July, 1 August 2011
Scorecard

Bangladesh	v	Zimbabwe XI
188 (60.1 overs); Mushfiqur Rahim 64 (143); Njabulo Ncube 3/40 (12.1 overs)		113 (45 overs); Craig Ervine 21 (76); Robiul Islam 3/33 (12 overs)
147 (47.5 overs); Shakib Al Hasan 40 (82); Prosper Utseya 3/25 (5.5 overs)		225/6 (63.4 overs); Forster Mutizwa 87* (125); Shakib Al Hasan 2/41 (13 overs)

Zimbabwe XI won by 4 wickets
Harare Sports Club, Harare
Umpires: (Zimbabwe) Owen Chirombe & (Zimbabwe) Jeremiah Matibiri
Player of the match: Forster Mutizwa (Zimbabwe XI)

- Bangladesh won the toss and elected to bat.

== Test series ==
=== Only Test ===
4–8 August 2011
Scorecard

Zimbabwe	v	Bangladesh
370 (131 overs); Hamilton Masakadza 104 (244 balls); Shakib Al Hasan 3/62 (26 overs)		287 (96.2 overs); Mohammad Ashraful 73 (158 balls); Brian Vitori 4/66 (24 overs)
291/5d (92 overs); Brendan Taylor 105* (267 balls); Shafiul Islam 1/29 (11 overs)		244 (57.3 overs); Tamim Iqbal 43 (44 balls) and Abdur Razzak 43 (17 balls); Kyle Jarvis 4/61 (16.3 overs)

Zimbabwe won by 130 runs
Harare Sports Club, Harare
Umpires: (Sri Lanka) Kumar Dharmasena & (Australia) Bruce Oxenford
Player of the match: (Zimbabwe) Brendan Taylor

- Bangladesh won the toss and elected to field.
- Craig Ervine, Kyle Jarvis, Tino Mawoyo and Brian Vitori (all Zimbabwe) made their Test debuts.
  This was Zimbabwe's first Test win since February 2004, when they defeated Bangladesh.

== ODI series ==
=== 1st ODI ===
12 August
Scorecard

Bangladesh; 184 (48.4 overs)	v	Zimbabwe; 186/6 (41.2 overs)
Mushfiqur Rahim 59 (91 balls); Brian Vitori 5/30 (10 overs)		Vusi Sibanda 96 (102 balls); Rubel Hossain 4/27 (10 overs)

Zimbabwe won by 4 wickets
Harare Sports Club, Harare
Umpires: (Sri Lanka) Kumar Dharmasena and (Zimbabwe) Russell Tiffin
Player of the match: (Zimbabwe) Brian Vitori

- Zimbabwe won the toss and elected to field
- Brian Vitori (Zimbabwe) made his ODI debut.

=== 2nd ODI ===
14 August
Scorecard

Bangladesh; 188 (47.3 overs)	v	Zimbabwe; 191/3 (44.1 overs)
Nasir Hossain 63 (92 balls); Brian Vitori 5/20 (9.3 overs)		Vusi Sibanda 67 (96 balls); Mohammad Ashraful 1/26 (6.1 overs)

Zimbabwe won by 7 wickets
Harare Sports Club, Harare
Umpires: (Sri Lanka) Kumar Dharmasena and (Zimbabwe) Russell Tiffin
Player of the match: (Zimbabwe) Brian Vitori

- Zimbabwe won the toss and elected to field
- Nasir Hossain (Bangladesh) made his ODI debut.

=== 3rd ODI ===
16 August
Scorecard

Zimbabwe; 250/7 (50 overs)	v	Bangladesh; 245 (49.2 overs)
Tatenda Taibu 83 (103 balls); Rubel Hossain 2/41 (10 overs)		Mushfiqur Rahim 101 (100 balls); Prosper Utseya 3/47 (10 overs)

Zimbabwe won by 5 runs
Harare Sports Club, Harare
Umpires: (Sri Lanka) Kumar Dharmasena and (Zimbabwe) Russell Tiffin
Player of the match: (Bangladesh) Mushfiqur Rahim

- Bangladesh won the toss and elected to field
- Shuvagoto Hom (Bangladesh) made his ODI debut.

=== 4th ODI ===
19 August
Scorecard

Zimbabwe; 199 (48.2 ov)	v	Bangladesh; 203/4 (36.4 ov)
Brendan Taylor 106 (137 balls); Rubel Hossain 4/31 (9 overs)		Tamim Iqbal 61 (53 balls); Kyle Jarvis 1/44 (6 overs)

Bangladesh won by 6 wickets
Queens Sports Club, Bulawayo
Umpires: (Zimbabwe) Owen Chirombe and (Sri Lanka) Kumar Dharmasena
Player of the match: (Bangladesh) Rubel Hossain

- Bangladesh won the toss and elected to field

=== 5th ODI ===
21 August
Scorecard

Bangladesh; 253/6 (50 overs)	v	Zimbabwe; 160 (38.2 overs)
Shakib Al Hasan 79 (71 balls); Ray Price 3/51 (10n overs)		Malcolm Waller 51 (70 balls); Mahmudullah 3/13 (4 overs)

Bangladesh won by 93 runs
Queens Sports Club, Bulawayo
Umpires: (Zimbabwe) Owen Chirombe and (Sri Lanka) Kumar Dharmasena
Player of the match: (Bangladesh) Shakib Al Hasan

- Zimbabwe won the toss and elected to field
