= West Indian cricket team in Zimbabwe in 2001 =

West Indies in Zimbabwe in 2001
| | Zimbabwe | West Indies |
- Dates: 19 July – 31 July 2001
| Captains | Heath Streak | Carl Hooper |

Test series
- Result: West Indies won the 2-match series 1–0
| Most runs | Alistair Campbell (202) | Chris Gayle (233) |
| Most wickets | Bryan Strang (10) | Colin Stuart (6) |
- Player of the series: Chris Gayle (WIN)

The West Indies cricket team toured Zimbabwe in June and July 2001 to play 2 Test matches against Zimbabwe. The series was named Clive Lloyd Trophy, in honor of former West Indian great Clive Lloyd. West Indies won the first title of the trophy by 1–0.

Before the Test series, West Indies participated to a triangular One Day International competition with Zimbabwe and India. The West Indies tour consisted of 3 List A matches and 2 First-class matches as well.

== Squads ==
| Zimbabwe | West Indies |
|---|---|
| Heath Streak (c); Tatenda Taibu (wk); Dion Ebrahim; Alistair Campbell; Stuart Carlisle; Craig Wishart; Guy Whittall; Grant Flower; Andy Blignaut; Bryan Strang; Ray Price; Hamilton Masakadza | Carl Hooper (c); Courtney Browne (wk); Ridley Jacobs (wk); Shivnarine Chanderpaul; Pedro Collins; Daren Ganga; Chris Gayle; Reon King; Neil McGarrell; Marlon Samuels; Ramnaresh Sarwan; Colin Stuart; Marlon Black; Leon Garrick; Dinanath Ramnarine; Wavell Hinds; Corey Collymore |

== Tour matches ==
=== List A: CFX Academy vs West Indians ===
17 June 2001
Scorecard

| CFX Academy; 205/5 (45 overs) | v | West Indians; 211/3 (45 overs) |
| Guy Croxford 86 (122); Marlon Samuels 3/29 (5 overs) | | Darren Ganga 101 (145); Dirk Viljoen 2/25 (8 overs) |

West Indians won by 6 runs
Country Club, Harare
Umpires: Christian Nyazika and WA Vaughan-Davies
Player of the match: Guy Croxford (CFX)

- West Indians won the toss and elected to bat.

=== List A: Zimbabwe Country vs West Indians ===
20 June 2001
Scorecard

| West Indians; 206/9 (50 overs) | v | Zimbabwe Country Districts; 210/3 (48 overs) |
| Shivnarine Chanderpaul 84 (114); Gus Mackay 3/22 (8 overs) | | Andy Waller 124 (152); Cameron Cuffy 2/32 (10 overs) |

Zimbabwe Country Districts won by 7 wickets
Harare South Country Club, Harare
Umpires: Quintin Goosen and Justice Tapfumaneyi

- West Indians won the toss and elected to bat.

=== List A: Zimbabwe A vs West Indians ===
20 June 2001
Scorecard

| Zimbabwe A 124 (34 overs) | v | West Indians; 277/6 (50 overs) |
| Gary Brent 36; Mahendra Nagamootoo 4/44 (9 overs) | | Ramnaresh Sarwan 94; Paul Strang 2/49 (10 overs) |

West Indians won by 153 runs
Harare Sports Club, Harare
Umpires: Graeme Evans and D Kalan

- Zimbabwe A won the toss and elected to field.

=== First-class: Zimbabwe President's XI vs West Indians ===
9–11 July 2001
Scorecard

| West Indians | v | Zimbabwe President's XI |
| 191 (48.4 overs); Neil McGarrell 47 (63); David Mutendera 3/41 (7 overs) | | 128/9d (46.4 overs); Hamilton Masakadza 47 (63); Reon King 3/22 (12.4 overs) |
| 457/5d (99 overs); Chris Gayle 259* (297); Mluleki Nkala 2/47 (8 overs) | | 306 (88.1 overs); Paul Strang 81* (89); Reon King 3/42 (17 overs) |

West Indians won by 214 runs
Country Club, Harare
Umpires: Ahmed Esat and Graeme Evans

- Zimbabwe President's XI won the toss and elected to field.

=== First-class: Zimbabwe A vs West Indians ===
14–16 July 2001
Scorecard

| Zimbabwe A | v | West Indians |
| 345 (96.4 overs); Alistair Campbell 140 (250); Colin Stuart 5/58 (17 overs) | | 374 (96.4 overs); Chris Gayle 164 (184); Ray Price 5/121 (34 overs) |
| 55/0 (9 overs); Guy Croxford 41* (32) | | 395 (93.4 overs); Chris Gayle 99 (130); Ray Price 2/99 (32.4 overs) |

Match drawn
Kwekwe Sports Club, Kwekwe
Umpires: Quintin Goosen and WA Vaughan-Davies

- Zimbabwe A won the toss and elected to field.

== Test series ==
=== 1st Test ===
19–22 July 2001
scorecard

| Zimbabwe | v | West Indies |
| 155 (59 overs); Guy Whittall 42 (113); Reon King 4/51 (17 overs) | | 559/6d (168 overs); Chris Gayle 175 (255); Heath Streak 2/110 (35 overs) |
| 228 (101.4 overs); Alistair Campbell 103 (229); Neil McGarrell 4/38 (24 overs) |

West Indies won by an innings and 176 runs
Queens Sports Club, Bulawayo
Umpires: Kevan Barbour (Zim) and Arani Jayaprakash (Ind)
Player of the match: Chris Gayle (WI)

- Zimbabwe won the toss and elected to bat.
- Tatenda Taibu (Zim) made his Test debut.

=== 2nd Test ===
27–31 July 2001
scorecard

| West Indies | v | Zimbabwe |
| 347 (111.2 overs); Ramnaresh Sarwan 86 (226); Bryan Strang 4/83 (32 overs) | | 131 (57.1 overs); Guy Whittall 43 (128); Neil McGarrell 4/23 (17 overs) |
| 98/1 (46.2 overs); Chris Gayle 52* (144); Heath Streak 1/34 (15.2 overs) | | 563/9d (54 overs); Hamilton Masakadza 119 (316); Colin Stuart 3/99 (60 overs) |

Match drawn
Harare Sports Club, Harare
Umpires: Kevan Barbour (Zim) and Arani Jayaprakash (Ind)
Player of the match: Hamilton Masakadza (Zim)

- West Indies won the toss and elected to field.
- Hamilton Masakadza (Zim) made his Test debut.
- Hamilton Masakadza beat the record held by Tatenda Taibu to become the youngest player to play for Zimbabwe. He also became the youngest player to score a century on Test debut (17 years, 354 days), and the second Zimbabwe player to score a century on Test debut.

== Coca-Cola Cup ==
The Coca-Cola Cup was a One Day International (ODI) tournament that was held between 23 June and 8 July 2001 in Zimbabwe. It was held after the Test series between Zimbabwe and India. India were the third team that competed in addition to Zimbabwe and West Indies for the Coca-Cola Cup. After six games between the three sides in the round-robin group stage, West Indies and India qualified for the final. India entered as favorites into the final having defeated West Indies in each of the two group-stage games.

However, in the final played on 7 July at the Harare Sports Club, West Indies defeated India by 16 runs. After having been put in to bat upon losing the toss, openers Chris Gayle and Daren Ganga started off strongly for West Indies scoring 96 runs in the first 15 overs. Setting India a target of 291, Corey Collymore, picking the crucial wickets of Sachin Tendulkar, Sourav Ganguly and VVS Laxman, returned figures of 4/49, and was named the player of the match.
