= Zimbabwean cricket team in the West Indies in 2012–13 =

	West Indies	Zimbabwe
- Dates: 22 February 2013 – 24 March 2013

Test series
- Result: West Indies won the 2-match series 2–0
Most runs	Denesh Ramdin (148)	Vusi Sibanda (94)
Most wickets	Shane Shillingford (19)	Kyle Jarvis (7)
- Player of the series: Shane Shillingford (West Indies)

One Day International series
- Results: West Indies won the 3-match series 3–0
Most runs	Kieran Powell (178)	Craig Ervine (121)
Most wickets	Dwayne Bravo (10)	Hamilton Masakadza (3)
- Player of the series: Darren Bravo (West Indies)

Twenty20 International series
- Results: West Indies won the 2-match series 2–0
Most runs	Lendl Simmons (104)	Hamilton Masakadza (62)
Most wickets	Samuel Badree (4); Dwayne Bravo (4)	Christopher Mpofu (3)
- Player of the series: Lendl Simmons (West Indies)

The Zimbabwe national cricket team toured the West Indies from 22 February 2013 to 24 March 2013. The teams played three ODIs, two T20Is, and two Test matches. During the 2nd Test, Chris Gayle scored his 89th six in Test cricket, surpassing Brian Lara's record of 88 sixes for a West Indian cricketer.

== Tour matches ==
=== University of West Indies Vice Chancellor's XI v Zimbabweans ===
20 February
09:30
Scorecard

University of West Indies Vice Chancellor's XI; 270 (48.4 overs)	v	Zimbabweans; 346/7 (50 overs)
Ramnaresh Sarwan 90 (72); Malcolm Waller 3/8 (2 overs)		Vusi Sibanda 147r.o (114); Chaim Holder 2/50 (10 over)

Zimbabweans won by 76 runs
Progress Park, St Andrew's, Grenada
Umpires: Peter Nero and Joel Wilson

- Zimbabweans won the toss and elected to bat

=== Three-day: Sagicor High Performance Centre v Zimbabweans ===
7–9 March
Scorecard

Zimbabweans	v	Sagicor High Performance Centre
255/8d (104 overs); Hamilton Masakadza 112 (273); Jomel Warrican 2/48 (19 overs)		230 (81.4 overs); Kyle Hope 62 (133); Graeme Cremer 7/79 (24 overs)
209/7 (66 overs); Vusi Sibanda 80 (108); Jomel Warrican 2/16 (15 overs)

Match drawn
Three Ws Oval, Bridgetown, Barbados
Umpires: Gregory Brathwaite (Barbados) and Nigel Duguid (Guyana)

- Zimbabweans won the toss and elected to bat.

== ODI series ==
=== 1st ODI ===
22 February
9:30
Scorecard

West Indies; 337/4 (50 overs)	v	Zimbabwe; 181/9 (50 overs)
Johnson Charles 130 (111); Christopher Mpofu 2/83 (10 overs)		Malcolm Waller 51 (75); Sunil Narine 3/28 (10 overs)

West Indies won by 156 runs
National Cricket Stadium, St. George's
Umpires: Ian Gould (England) and Joel Wilson (West Indies)
Player of the match: Johnson Charles (West Indies)

- Zimbabwe won the toss and elected to field

=== 2nd ODI ===
24 February
9:30
Scorecard

Zimbabwe; 273/8 (50 overs)	v	West Indies; 274/3 (49 overs)
Craig Ervine 80 (85); Dwayne Bravo 6/43 (10 overs)		Ramnaresh Sarwan 120 (143); Hamilton Masakadza 2/27 (7 overs)

West Indies won by 7 wickets
National Cricket Stadium, St. George's
Umpires: Johan Cloete (South Africa) and Peter Nero (West Indies)
Player of the match: Dwayne Bravo (West Indies)

- Zimbabwe won the toss and elected to bat
- Tendai Chatara (Zimbabwe) made his ODI debut

=== 3rd ODI ===
26 February
9:30
Scorecard

Zimbabwe; 211/9 (50 overs)	v	West Indies; 215/5 (46.2 overs)
Chamu Chibhabha 48* (68); Veerasammy Permaul 3/40 (10 overs)		Darren Bravo 72* (103); Tinotenda Mutombodzi 2/35 (10 overs)

West Indies won by 5 wickets
National Cricket Stadium, St. George's
Umpires: Gregory Brathwaite (West Indies) and Ian Gould (England)
Player of the match: Darren Bravo (West Indies)

- Zimbabwe won the toss and elected to bat.
- Tinotenda Mutombodzi (Zimbabwe) made his ODI debut.

== T20I series ==
=== 1st T20I ===
2 March
14:00
Scorecard

Zimbabwe; 130/8 (20 overs)	v	West Indies; 131/2 (16.1 overs)
Malcolm Waller 49 (34); Tino Best 3/18 (4 overs)		Lendl Simmons 63* (49); Christopher Mpofu 2/14 (4 overs)

West Indies won by 8 wickets
Sir Vivian Richards Stadium, North Sound, Antigua
Umpires: Peter Nero (Trinidad) and Joel Wilson (Trinidad)
Player of the match: Lendl Simmons (West Indies)

- Zimbabwe won the toss and elected to bat
- Natsai Mushangwe and Tinotenda Mutombodzi (Zimbabwe) made their T20I debuts

=== 2nd T20I ===
3 March
14:00
Scorecard

West Indies; 158/7 (20 overs)	v	Zimbabwe; 117/6 (20 overs)
Kieron Pollard 46* (24); Tinotenda Mutombodzi 2/28 (4 overs)		Hamilton Masakadza 53* (51); Samuel Badree 3/17 (4 overs)

West Indies won by 41 runs
Sir Vivian Richards Stadium, North Sound, Antigua
Umpires: Gregory Brathwaite (Barbados) and Joel Wilson (Trinidad)
Player of the match: Samuel Badree (West Indies)

- West Indies won the toss and elected to bat
- Shannon Gabriel (West Indies) made his T20I debut

== Test series ==
=== 1st Test ===
12–16 March
Scorecard

Zimbabwe	v	West Indies
211 (76.4 overs); Tino Mawoyo 50 (95); Marlon Samuels 4/13 (6.4 overs)		307 (84.2 overs); Darren Sammy 73 (69); Kyle Jarvis 5/54 (17.2 overs)
107 (41.4 overs); Craig Ervine 23* (69); Shane Shillingford 6/49 (16 overs)		12/1 (5 overs); Kieran Powell 6 (6); Tendai Chatara 1/1 (2 overs)

West Indies won by 9 wickets
Kensington Oval, Bridgetown, Barbados
Umpires: Ranmore Martinesz (SL) and Bruce Oxenford (Aus)
Player of the match: Shane Shillingford (West Indies)

- Zimbabwe won the toss and elected to bat.
- Ray Price (Zimbabwe) played his last Test match
- Tendai Chatara (Zimbabwe) made his Test debut.

=== 2nd Test ===
20–24 March
Scorecard

Zimbabwe	v	West Indies
175 (60.5 overs); Brendan Taylor 33 (62); Shane Shillingford 5/59 (21.5 overs)		381/8d (117 overs); Shivnarine Chanderpaul 108 (284); Prosper Utseya 3/60 (22 overs)
141 (42.2 overs); Vusi Sibanda 35 (57); Shane Shillingford 5/34 (15 overs)

West Indies won by an innings and 65 runs
Windsor Park, Roseau, Dominica
Umpires: Tony Hill (NZ) and Ranmore Martinesz (SL)
Player of the match: Shane Shillingford (West Indies)

- West Indies won the toss and elected to field.
- Start of play was delayed on Day 1 due to a wet outfield.
- Start of play was delayed on Day 3 due to a wet outfield.
- Sean Williams (Zimbabwe) made his Test debut.
