= Clive Lloyd Trophy =

Cricket trophy

- Countries: West Indies and Zimbabwe
- Administrator: Cricket West Indies and Zimbabwe Cricket
- Format: Test cricket
- First edition: 2001
- Latest edition: 2022-23
- Tournament format: Test Series
- Number of teams: 2 (West Indies & Zimbabwe)
- Current trophy holder: West Indies
- Most successful: West Indies (5 titles)

The Clive Lloyd Trophy is a cricket trophy named after the former West Indies captain Clive Lloyd, that is awarded to the winner of Test series between West Indies and Zimbabwe. The Trophy was first contested in a two-Test series in Zimbabwe in 2001, though the two sides did play one series before the naming of the Trophy during the 1999/2000 season, another two-Test series the West Indies won 2-0. West Indies won the 2017-18 season Test series 1-0.

== Results ==
Year	Host	Winning team
2001	Zimbabwe	West Indies
2003-04	Zimbabwe	West Indies
2012	West Indies	West Indies
2017-18	Zimbabwe	West Indies
2022-23	Zimbabwe	West Indies

Total Series	West Indies	Zimbabwe	Drawn
5	5	0	0

== List of Test series ==
Series	Years	Host	Tests	West Indies	Zimbabwe	Drawn	Result	Holder	Player of the series
1	2001	Zimbabwe	2	1	0	1	West Indies	West Indies	(Cricket West Indies) Chris Gayle
2	2003-04	Zimbabwe	2	1	0	1	West Indies	West Indies	(Cricket West Indies) Chris Gayle
3	2012	West Indies	2	2	0	0	West Indies	West Indies	(Cricket West Indies) Shane Shillingford
4	2017-18	Zimbabwe	2	1	0	1	West Indies	West Indies	(Cricket West Indies) Devendra Bishoo
5	2022-23	Zimbabwe	2	1	0	1	West Indies	West Indies	(Cricket West Indies) Gudakesh Motie
Total			10	6	0	4			

== See also ==
- West Indies cricket team
- Zimbabwe national cricket team
- Zimbabwean cricket team in the West Indies in 1999–2000
- West Indian cricket team in Zimbabwe in 2001
- West Indian cricket team in Zimbabwe in 2003–04
- Zimbabwean cricket team in the West Indies in 2012–13
