= West Indian cricket team in Zimbabwe in 2017–18 =

International cricket tour

	Zimbabwe	West Indies
- Dates: 15 October – 2 November 2017
Captains	Graeme Cremer	Jason Holder

Test series
- Result: West Indies won the 2-match series 1–0
Most runs	Hamilton Masakadza (251)	Shai Hope (174)
Most wickets	Graeme Cremer (9)	Devendra Bishoo (13)
- Player of the series: Devendra Bishoo (WI)

The West Indies cricket team toured Zimbabwe in October and November 2017 to play two Tests matches for the Clive Lloyd Trophy. The teams last played a Test match against each other in March 2013. Ahead of the Test series, the two teams also played a three-day warm-up fixture. The series marked the international comebacks of Brendan Taylor and Kyle Jarvis, after their resignation from their Kolpak deals. West Indies won the series 1–0, after the final match finished in a draw. It was the first Test series win for the West Indies with Jason Holder as captain, and the first time that Zimbabwe had drawn a Test match since playing Bangladesh in January 2005.

== Squads ==
Tests
Zimbabwe	West Indies
Graeme Cremer (c); Regis Chakabva; Chamu Chibhabha; Michael Chinouya; Tendai Chisoro; Craig Ervine; Kyle Jarvis; Hamilton Masakadza; Nyasha Mayavo; Solomon Mire; Peter Moor (wk); Christopher Mpofu; Sikandar Raza; Brendan Taylor; Malcolm Waller; Sean Williams	Jason Holder (c); Devendra Bishoo; Jermaine Blackwood; Kraigg Brathwaite; Roston Chase; Miguel Cummins; Shane Dowrich (wk); Shannon Gabriel; Shimron Hetmyer; Kyle Hope; Shai Hope; Alzarri Joseph; Kieran Powell; Raymon Reifer; Kemar Roach

== Tour match ==
=== Three-day match: Zimbabwe A v West Indies ===
15–17 October 2017
Scorecard

West Indies	v	Zimbabwe A
336/7d (97.1 overs); Shai Hope 85 (107); Michael Chinouya 2/55 (19 overs)		143 (44.1 overs); Peter Moor 32 (34); Shannon Gabriel 2/5 (6 overs)
263/5d (68 overs); Kieran Powell 77 (162); Ryan Burl 1/5 (2 overs)		70/4 (27 overs); Chamu Chibhabha 24 (57); Devendra Bishoo 1/5 (7 overs)

Match drawn
Bulawayo Athletic Club, Bulawayo
Umpires: Christopher Phiri (Zim) and Langton Rusere (Zim)

- West Indies won the toss and elected to bat.
- 15 players per side (11 batting, 11 fielding).

== Test series ==
=== 1st Test ===
21–25 October 2017 (Note: While five days of play were scheduled for each Test, the first Test reached a result within four days.)
Scorecard

West Indies	v	Zimbabwe
219 (82.5 overs); Shai Hope 90* (201); Graeme Cremer 4/64 (23.5 overs)		159 (61.3 overs); Hamilton Masakadza 42 (78); Devendra Bishoo 5/79 (24 overs)
373 (126 overs); Roston Chase 95 (139); Graeme Cremer 4/114 (34 overs)		316 (90.4 overs); Brendan Taylor 73 (151); Devendra Bishoo 4/105 (32 overs)

West Indies won by 117 runs
Queens Sports Club, Bulawayo
Umpires: Kumar Dharmasena (SL) and Paul Reiffel (Aus)
Player of the match: Devendra Bishoo (WI)

- West Indies won the toss and elected to bat.
- Solomon Mire (Zim) made his Test debut.

=== 2nd Test ===
29 October–2 November 2017
Scorecard

Zimbabwe	v	West Indies
326 (109.1 overs); Hamilton Masakadza 147 (240); Kemar Roach 3/44 (18.1 overs)		448 (178.2 overs); Jason Holder 110 (198); Sikandar Raza 5/99 (48 overs)
301/7 (144 overs); Sikandar Raza 89 (203); Shannon Gabriel 2/34 (21 overs)

Match drawn
Queens Sports Club, Bulawayo
Umpires: Kumar Dharmasena (SL) and Simon Fry (Aus)
Player of the match: Sikandar Raza (Zim)

- Zimbabwe won the toss and elected to bat.
- Only 61 overs were bowled on day 1 due to rain.
- Tendai Chisoro (Zim) made his Test debut.
- Hamilton Masakadza (Zim) became the fifth batsman for Zimbabwe to score 2,000 runs in Tests.
- Devendra Bishoo (WI) took his 100th wicket in Tests.
- Sikandar Raza (Zim) took his first five-wicket haul in Tests.
- Shane Dowrich (WI) scored his maiden century in Tests.
- Jason Holder and Shane Dowrich made the highest total for the eighth-wicket for the West Indies in Tests (212). This was only the second time in Test cricket that two batsmen coming in at number 8 or lower had scored a century in the same innings.
