= West Indian cricket team in Zimbabwe in 2003–04 =

The West Indian national cricket team toured Zimbabwe in October and November 2003 and played a two-match Test series against the Zimbabwean national cricket team. West Indies won the Test series 1–0. West Indies were captained by Brian Lara and Zimbabwe by Heath Streak. In addition, the teams played a five-match series of Limited Overs Internationals (LOI) which West Indies won 3–2. Before the test series, the West Indian team practiced at the Takashinga Cricket Club, which was officially opened by West Indian captain Brian Lara and a plaque to commemorate the moment was hung at the club house.

== Test series summary ==
=== 1st Test ===
4–8 November 2003
Scorecard

Zimbabwe	v	West Indies
507/9d (152.3 overs); HH Streak 127* (264); FH Edwards 5/133 (34.3 overs)		335 (114.2 overs); WW Hinds 79 (95); RW Price 6/73 (37.2 overs)
200/7d (52 overs); S Matsikenyeri 46* (64); VC Drakes 4/67 (20 overs)		207/9 (83 overs); RD Jacobs 60* (139); RW Price 4/88 (38 overs)

Match drawn
Harare Sports Club, Harare
Umpires: BF Bowden (NZ) and SJA Taufel (AUS)
Player of the match: HH Streak (ZIM)

- Zimbabwe won the toss and elected to bat.
- S Matsikenyeri and V Sibanda (both ZIM) made their Test debuts.

=== 2nd Test ===
12–16 November 2003
Scorecard

West Indies	v	Zimbabwe
481 (107 overs); BC Lara 191 (203); RW Price 5/199 (43 overs)		377 (133.1 overs); MA Vermeulen 118 (304); CD Collymore 4/70 (24 overs)
128 (52.4 overs); WW Hinds 28 (75); RW Price 4/36 (21 overs)		104 (49 overs); HH Streak 33* (64); OAC Banks 3/35 (15 overs)

West Indies won by 128 runs
Queens Sports Club, Bulawayo
Umpires: RE Koertzen (SA) and SJA Taufel (AUS)
Player of the match: BC Lara (WI)

- West Indies won the toss and elected to bat.

== ODI series summary ==
=== 1st ODI ===
22 November 2003
Scorecard

West Indies; 347/6 (50 overs)	v	Zimbabwe; 173/3 (34.5 overs)
CH Gayle 153* (160); S Matsikenyeri 1/31 (3 overs)		CB Wishart 72* (81); CH Gayle 2/21 (10 overs)

West Indies won by 51 runs (D/L method)
Queens Sports Club, Bulawayo
Umpires: KC Barbour (ZIM) and RE Koertzen (SA)
Player of the match: CH Gayle (WI)

- West Indies won the toss and elected to bat.
- When play was halted Zimbabwe needed to have scored 225 runs to win.
- R Rampaul (WI) and V Sibanda (ZIM) made their ODI debuts.

=== 2nd ODI ===
23 November 2003
Scorecard

West Indies; 125 (42.3 overs)	v	Zimbabwe; 128/4 (29.4 overs)
MN Samuels 36* (53); RW Price 2/16 (10 overs)		MA Vermeulen 66* (79); CD Collymore 2/27 (7 overs)

Zimbabwe won by 6 wickets
Queens Sports Club, Bulawayo
Umpires: RE Koertzen (SA) and ID Robinson (ZIM)
Player of the match: MA Vermeulen (ZIM)

- West Indies won the toss and elected to bat.

=== 3rd ODI ===
26 November 2003
Scorecard

Zimbabwe; 229/5 (50 overs)	v	West Indies; 208 (47.2 overs)
MA Vermeulen 66 (70); WW Hinds 2/43 (10 overs)		CH Gayle 61 (112); AM Blignaut 4/43 (10 overs)

Zimbabwe won by 21 runs
Harare Sports Club, Harare
Umpires: KC Barbour (ZIM) and EAR de Silva (SL)
Player of the match: HH Streak (ZIM)

- West Indies won the toss and elected to field.

=== 4th ODI ===
29 November 2003
Scorecard

West Indies; 256/3 (45 overs)	v	Zimbabwe; 150/7 (32 overs)
WW Hinds 127* (141); HH Streak 1/46 (8 overs)		T Taibu 66 (85); FH Edwards 6/22 (7 overs)

West Indies won by 72 runs (D/L method)
Harare Sports Club, Harare
Umpires: EAR de Silva (SL) and ID Robinson (ZIM)
Player of the match: FH Edwards (WI)

- Zimbabwe won the toss and elected to field.
- West Indies innings was reduced to 45 overs.
- Zimbabwe's target was 223 runs in 32 overs.
- FH Edwards (WI) made his ODI debut.

=== 5th ODI ===
30 November 2003
Scorecard

Zimbabwe; 196 (47.5 overs)	v	West Indies; 197/2 (25.4 overs)
MA Vermeulen 36 (54); RL Powell 2/32 (7 overs)		CH Gayle 112* (75); SM Ervine 1/35 (4.4 overs)

West Indies won by 8 wickets
Harare Sports Club, Harare
Umpires: KC Barbour (ZIM) and EAR de Silva (SL)
Player of the match: CH Gayle (WI)

- Zimbabwe won the toss and elected to bat.
- A Maregwede (ZIM) made his ODI debut.
