= Zimbabwean cricket team in South Africa in 2018–19 =

International cricket tour

	South Africa	Zimbabwe
- Dates: 30 September – 14 October 2018
Captains	Faf du Plessis (Note: JP Duminy captained South Africa in the first and second ODIs.)	Hamilton Masakadza

One Day International series
- Results: South Africa won the 3-match series 3–0
Most runs	Heinrich Klaasen (104); Aiden Markram (104)	Sean Williams (82)
Most wickets	Imran Tahir (10)	Tendai Chatara (6)
- Player of the series: Imran Tahir (SA)

Twenty20 International series
- Results: South Africa won the 3-match series 2–0
Most runs	Rassie van der Dussen (69)	Sean Williams (62)
Most wickets	Imran Tahir (5)	Christopher Mpofu (3); Kyle Jarvis (3)
- Player of the series: Imran Tahir (SA)

The Zimbabwe cricket team toured South Africa in September and October 2018 to play three One Day Internationals (ODIs) and three Twenty20 International (T20I) matches. The ODI fixtures were part of South Africa's preparations for the 2019 Cricket World Cup.

Dale Steyn, who last played an ODI in October 2016, was named in South Africa's ODI squad following a lengthy injury-enforced break. Steyn was selected to play in the second ODI of the series.

Before the start of the tour, both Faf du Plessis and Hashim Amla were initially ruled out of South Africa's squads due to injury. JP Duminy was named captain in place of du Plessis, with Dean Elgar added to the ODI squad, replacing Amla. In the first ODI, Duminy captained South Africa for the first time in ODIs. However, ahead of the third ODI match, du Plessis was declared fit to play quicker than expected, and returned to the side.

In the second ODI of the tour, Hamilton Masakadza became the fourth cricketer for Zimbabwe to play in 200 ODI matches. South Africa won the ODI series 3–0. South Africa won the T20I series 2–0 after the final match was washed out with no play possible.

== Squads ==
ODIs		T20Is	
South Africa	Zimbabwe	South Africa	Zimbabwe
Faf du Plessis (c); JP Duminy (vc); ~~Hashim Amla~~; Dean Elgar; Reeza Hendricks; Christiaan Jonker; Heinrich Klaasen; ~~Keshav Maharaj~~; Aiden Markram; Wiaan Mulder; Lungi Ngidi; Andile Phehlukwayo; Kagiso Rabada; Tabraiz Shamsi; Dale Steyn; Imran Tahir; Khaya Zondo	Hamilton Masakadza (c); Tendai Chatara; Elton Chigumbura; Craig Ervine; Kyle Jarvis; Tinashe Kamunhukamwe; Wellington Masakadza; Brandon Mavuta; Solomon Mire; Peter Moor; Ryan Murray; Richard Ngarava; Brendan Taylor; Donald Tiripano; Sean Williams	Faf du Plessis (c); JP Duminy (vc); Gihahn Cloete; Junior Dala; Quinton de Kock; Robert Frylinck; Christiaan Jonker; Heinrich Klaasen; David Miller; Lungi Ngidi; Dane Paterson; Andile Phehlukwayo; Tabraiz Shamsi; Imran Tahir; Rassie van der Dussen	Hamilton Masakadza (c); Tendai Chatara; Chamu Chibhabha; Elton Chigumbura; Tendai Chisoro; Kyle Jarvis; Neville Madziva; Wellington Masakadza; Brandon Mavuta; Solomon Mire; Peter Moor; Christopher Mpofu; Tarisai Musakanda; Brendan Taylor; Sean Williams

Prior to the start of the tour, Keshav Maharaj was released from South Africa's squad. Ahead of the second ODI match, Wiaan Mulder suffered an injury and was ruled out of South Africa's squad for the rest of the series. Following the first T20I match, Imran Tahir was released from South Africa's squad, to allow the team to try out other bowling options.

== ODI Series ==
=== 1st ODI ===
30 September 2018
10:00
Scorecard

Zimbabwe; 117 (34.1 overs)	v	South Africa; 119/5 (26.1 overs)
Elton Chigumbura 27 (37); Lungi Ngidi 3/19 (8.1 overs)		Heinrich Klaasen 44 (44); Tendai Chatara 2/12 (6 overs)

South Africa won by 5 wickets
Diamond Oval, Kimberley
Umpires: Chris Gaffaney (NZ) and Bongani Jele (SA)
Player of the match: Lungi Ngidi (SA)

- South Africa won the toss and elected to field.
- Christiaan Jonker (SA) and Brandon Mavuta (Zim) both made their ODI debuts.
- JP Duminy (SA) scored his 5,000th run in ODIs.

=== 2nd ODI ===
3 October 2018
13:30 (D/N)
Scorecard

South Africa; 198 (47.3 overs)	v	Zimbabwe; 78 (24 overs)
Dale Steyn 60 (85); Tendai Chatara 3/42 (9 overs)		Hamilton Masakadza 27 (40); Imran Tahir 6/24 (6 overs)

South Africa won by 120 runs
Mangaung Oval, Bloemfontein
Umpires: Chris Gaffaney (NZ) and Adrian Holdstock (SA)
Player of the match: Dale Steyn (SA)

- South Africa won the toss and elected to bat.
- Hamilton Masakadza (Zim) played in his 200th ODI.
- Imran Tahir became the fourth bowler for South Africa to take a hat-trick in ODIs.
- This was Zimbabwe's lowest total against South Africa in ODIs.

=== 3rd ODI ===
6 October 2018
13:30 (D/N)
Scorecard

Zimbabwe; 228 (49.3 overs)	v	South Africa; 231/6 (45.5 overs)
Sean Williams 69 (79); Dale Steyn 3/29 (9.3 overs)		Reeza Hendricks 66 (82); Donald Tiripano 2/35 (9 overs)

South Africa won by 4 wickets
Boland Park, Paarl
Umpires: Chris Gaffaney (NZ) and Shaun George (SA)
Player of the match: Heinrich Klaasen (SA)

- Zimbabwe won the toss and elected to bat.
- Brendan Taylor (Zim) scored his 6,000th run in ODIs.

== T20I series ==
=== 1st T20I ===
9 October 2018
18:00 (N)
Scorecard

South Africa; 160/6 (20 overs)	v	Zimbabwe; 126 (17.2 overs)
Rassie van der Dussen 56 (44); Kyle Jarvis 3/37 (4 overs)		Peter Moor 44 (21); Imran Tahir 5/23 (4 overs)

South Africa won by 34 runs
Buffalo Park, East London
Umpires: Shaun George (SA) and Adrian Holdstock (SA)
Player of the match: Imran Tahir (SA)

- South Africa won the toss and elected to bat.
- Gihahn Cloete and Rassie van der Dussen (SA) both made their T20I debuts.
- Imran Tahir (SA) took his second five-wicket haul in T20Is.

=== 2nd T20I ===
12 October 2018
18:00 (N)
Scorecard

Zimbabwe; 132/7 (20 overs)	v	South Africa; 135/4 (15.4 overs)
Sean Williams 41 (28); Robert Frylinck 2/20 (4 overs)		JP Duminy 33* (26); Sean Williams 2/25 (3 overs)

South Africa won by 6 wickets
Senwes Park, Potchefstroom
Umpires: Shaun George (SA) and Allahudien Paleker (SA)
Player of the match: Dane Paterson (SA)

- Zimbabwe won the toss and elected to bat.
- Hamilton Masakadza became the first batsman for Zimbabwe to score 1,500 runs in T20Is.

=== 3rd T20I ===
14 October 2018
14:30
Scorecard

South Africa	v	Zimbabwe

Match abandoned
Willowmoore Park, Benoni
Umpires: Adrian Holdstock (SA) and Bongani Jele (SA)

- No toss.
- No play was possible due to rain.
