= Sikandar Raza =

Zimbabwean cricketer (born 1986)

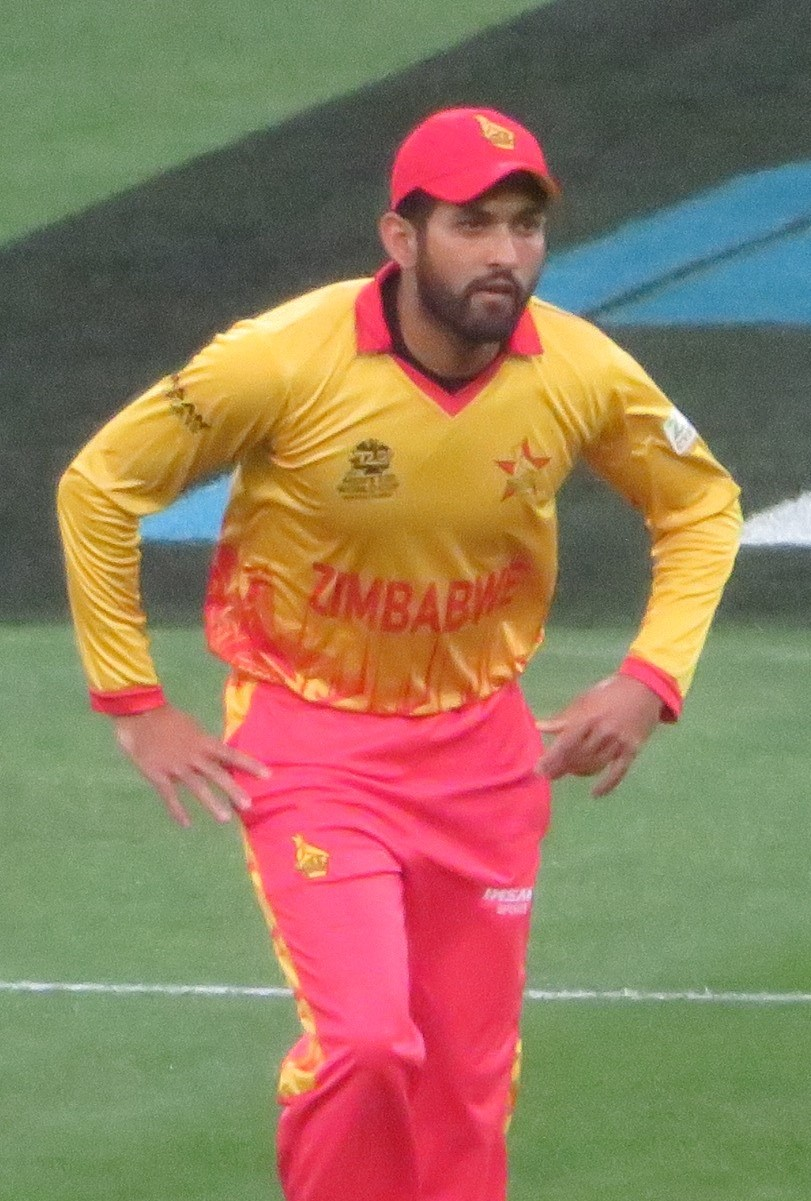
- Raza during 2022 T20 World Cup

Personal information
- Full name: Sikandar Raza Butt
- Born: 24 April 1986 (age 40); Sialkot, Pakistan
- Batting: Right-handed
- Bowling: Right-arm off break
- Role: All-rounder

International information
- National side: Zimbabwe (2013–present)
- Test debut (cap 89): 3 September 2013 v Pakistan
- Last Test: 20 October 2025 v Afghanistan
- ODI debut (cap 116): 3 May 2013 v Bangladesh
- Last ODI: 23 October 2026 v Afghanistan
- ODI shirt no.: 24
- T20I debut (cap 37): 11 May 2013 v Bangladesh
- Last T20I: 1 November 2026 v Afghanistan
- T20I shirt no.: 24

Domestic team information
- Years: Team
- 2006/07–2008/09: Northerns (Note: Only teams he has played for in more than one season are shown in this list.)
- 2009/10–2010/11: Southern Rocks
- 2011/12–2016/17: Mashonaland Eagles
- 2017–2019: Chittagong Vikings
- 2017/18–2019/20: Matabeleland Tuskers
- 2023–2024: Punjab Kings
- 2023–2025: Lahore Qalandars
- 2023–Present: Dambulla Sixers

Career statistics
Competition	Test	ODI	T20I	FC
Matches	22	162	147	71
Runs scored	1,434	4,824	3,369	4,610
Batting average	34.14	37.39	26.11	36.58
100s/50s	1/11	7/27	2/17	7/26
Top score	127	141	133*	226
Balls bowled	3,335	5,468	2,496	5,660
Wickets	40	101	116	83
Bowling average	44.55	44.00	25.41	37.09
5 wickets in innings	2	0	1	2
10 wickets in match	0	0	0	0
Best bowling	7/113	4/55	5/18	7/113
Catches/stumpings	7/–	64/–	66/–	53/–
- Source: Cricinfo, 12 November 2026

Sikandar Raza Butt (Urdu: سکندر رضا; born 24 April 1986) is a Zimbabwean international cricketer. He is an all-rounder, who bats right-handed and bowls right arm off-spin. He made his international debut for Zimbabwe in May 2013 and is the first player from his country to score a T20I century. He is the current captain of Zimbabwe T20I team.

== Early life ==
Raza was born in Sialkot to a Punjabi-speaking Kashmiri Muslim family. He studied at the Pakistan Air Force College, Lower Topa for three years and aspired to be a Pakistan Air Force pilot, but his dreams were cut short when he failed a vision test that was mandatory for selection in the Pakistan airforce at that time.

In 2002, Raza moved with his family to Zimbabwe. He went to Scotland, where he pursued a bachelor's degree in software engineering at the Glasgow Caledonian University. During season 2006, he scored three T20 centuries for Weirs CC - on the same square the famous Bollywood movie 83 was filmed in 2019.

It was here where Raza played semi-professional cricket, realising his potential.

== Domestic and T20 franchise career ==
After the revamping of Zimbabwe's domestic structure in 2009, Raza went on to play first-class cricket for the Mashonaland Eagles. He made his first-class debut on 12 April 2007 for Northerns against Easterns during the 2007 Logan Cup. He is a successful first-class cricketer, with a top score of 146.

Raza also played List A cricket originally for Northerns but later switched to play for Mashonaland Eagles. He made his List A debut in 2007. He made his Twenty20 debut for the Southern Rocks in 2010 against the Desert Vipers. Raza turned out to be a T20 specialist, and was the leading run-scorer in the 2010 Stanbic Bank T20 Competition.

In the Metbank Pro40 Championship Final in 2010, Raza scored a brilliant 44 for Southern Rocks as they cruised to the title against Mid West Rhinos. It was his first big performance that caught the selectorial eye. In January 2011, he achieved his career best List-A score of 80 runs.

Raza's performances earned him a place in the preliminary squad for Zimbabwe's 2011 Cricket World Cup campaign, but did not make it to the final 15 man squad. By then, he had another fine performance, at the Masvingo Sports Club, where his opening stand of 161 with Chamu Chibhabha, simply by bludgeoning the Matabeleland Tuskers bowlers, led the foundation for a massive Southern Rocks victory. This made the Zimbabwean selectors select Raza for the training squad for the Australia A and South Africa A tri-series. The only matter, was he did not have citizenship status, which was granted to him in September 2011. By then, he had another remarkable performance, scoring 93 off just 48 balls for Southern Rocks against Matabeleland Tuskers.

Opening the innings with the legendary West Indian Brian Lara and then getting great support from Elton Chigumbura, Raza took on the Matabeleland Tuskers's bowling attack. He then represented a Zimbabwe XI team before the Bangladesh tour to Zimbabwe started. Zimbabwe XI won the two matches.

On 3 June 2018, Raza was selected to play for the Montreal Tigers in the players' draft for the inaugural edition of the Global T20 Canada tournament.

In October 2018, Raza was named in Tshwane Spartans' squad for the first edition of the Mzansi Super League T20 tournament. Later the same month, he was named in the squad for the Chittagong Vikings team, following the draft for the 2018–19 Bangladesh Premier League.

In July 2019, Raza was selected to play for the Amsterdam Knights in the inaugural edition of the Euro T20 Slam cricket tournament. However, the following month the tournament was cancelled. In July 2020, he was named in the Trinbago Knight Riders squad for the 2020 Caribbean Premier League.

In December 2020, Raza was selected to play for the Southern Rocks in the 2020–21 Logan Cup. In December 2022, Raza was drafted by the Lahore Qalandars as their Gold Category round pick at the 2023 PSL draft.

In December 2022, Raza was bought by the Punjab Kings in the 2023 Indian Premier League for 50 Lakhs. He made his IPL debut for Punjab Kings against Kolkata Knight Riders on 1 April 2023, scoring 16 off 13 balls and taking the figures of 1-25 from 3 overs. On 15 April 2023, he claimed his maiden IPL half-century, scoring 57 runs of 41 balls helping his team to defeat Lucknow Super Giants by 2 wickets. With this, he also became the first Zimbabwean player to score a half-century in IPL.

In February 2026, Raza signed a contract to play for Worcestershire Rapids in that year's English T20 Blast.

== International career ==
Raza made his ODI debut for Zimbabwe in May 2013 against Bangladesh and scored only three runs batting at number three thus becoming the 116th player to appear for Zimbabwe in the format. He also became the first non-residential player to represent Zimbabwe at international level.

Raza scored 82 off 112 balls with 6 fours and two sixes against India during the first of the five match home bilateral ODI series in 2013 which was also only his 4th ODI appearance. He made his test debut on 3 September 2013 and scored 60 runs on his debut against Pakistan at Harare Sports Club, in which he had a 127-run partnership for the fourth wicket with Malcolm Waller that put the hosts on course for the lead. Despite scoring a half-century on his Test debut, he was dropped from the team when Zimbabwean captain Brendan Taylor returned to the team.

Raza made his T20I debut on 5 November 2013 against Bangladesh. He is also the youngest person to hit a fifty in T20I. He achieved this feat when he was just above 17 years old. He scored his maiden ODI century against Afghanistan in July 2014, while opening the batting helping Zimbabwe to register a convincing victory over Afghanistan by eight wickets. He also set the record for the highest individual score by a Zimbabwe batsman in an ODI run chase as well as successful ODI run chase with 141. During the run chase, he along with Hamilton Masakadza set the highest partnership for any wicket for Zimbabwe in their ODI history as the duo added 224 runs for the opening wicket which made the run chase look so easy.

He was part of the Zimbabwean squad for the 2015 Cricket World Cup tournament. Although his World Cup performance with the bat was not up to the level of expectations, he impressed many by his bowling. Raza was named stand-in captain in the second T20I during the India tour of Zimbabwe in 2015. Before this, he captained four times for Mash Eagles in domestic cricket in 2012. He led Zimbabwe in their first win of the tour by 10 runs.

During the 2016–17 Zimbabwe Tri-Series, he jointly with Tendai Chisoro set the highest record 9th wicket partnership for Zimbabwe in ODI cricket by adding unbeaten 91 runs which propelled Zimbabwe to a reasonable totak of 218/8 after reeling at one stage on 127/8. The partnership was crucial in the end as Zimbabwe stunned West Indies by 5 runs in D/L method. Raza remained unbeaten on 76 off 103 balls.

The highlight of Raza's match-winning ability came during the Zimbabwe tour to Sri Lanka in 2017. He guided Zimbabwe to win the final ODI to seal the series 3–2, their first ever series win against Sri Lanka. It was their first away series win since 2009 and the first away series win against a Test nation since defeating Bangladesh in 2001. It was also Zimbabwe's first win in a five-match series away from home. Raza won the man of the match award for his match winning knock in the final ODI. In the same tour, Raza scored his maiden Test century in the one-off test, guiding Zimbabwe to post a huge task to chase for the hosts. Despite his performances, Sri Lanka chased 389 runs and won the one-off test, by recording the highest chase in Asian soil.

During the second test against West Indies, Raza took his maiden Test five-wicket haul in the second innings. Apart from fifer, Raza also scored two fifties and became only the second Test cricketer to score 80 plus in both innings and take a five-wicket haul after Proteas Jacques Kallis. Due to his all-round performances, Zimbabwe able to draw the match, and earned him man of the match as well. This draw, gave Zimbabweans, their first draw in 12 years, and the first time they avoid a loss since 2013 in 10 Tests.

In February 2018, the International Cricket Council (ICC) named Raza as one of the ten players to watch ahead of the 2018 Cricket World Cup Qualifier tournament. He was awarded the Player of The Tournament award for his 319 runs and 15 wickets during the Cricket World Cup Qualifiers though Zimbabwe failed to qualify for the 2019 Cricket World Cup. When he was asked by commentator Pommie Mbangwa whether he was happy with the Player of the Tournament award, he started by saying he was unhappy and insisted that the team had broken the hearts of 15 million Zimbabweans and also vented his frustrations over the ten team World Cup which restricted associate nations from competing in the biggest showpiece. Following Zimbabwe's failure to qualify for 2019 World Cup, the ZC Board took aggressive approach by snubbing senior players from the team including Raza for the 2018 home Zimbabwe Tri-Nation Series which also featured Australia and Pakistan.

In January 2020, in the second Test against Sri Lanka, Raza took the second-best bowling figures in an innings for a Zimbabwe bowler in Test cricket, with 7 for 113 from 43 overs. On 6 March 2020, in the third match against Bangladesh, Raza played in his 100th ODI match.

In April 2021, he was sidelined from international cricket for a brief period and his international career was in jeopardy when he suffered an infection in his bone marrow. His condition was also speculated to be cancerous and he would have probably amputated had he opted for chemotherapy. It was later revealed that his condition was normal and reports of his condition to be cancerous were downplayed. In July 2021, he returned to competitive cricket and made international return during the bilateral home ODI series against Bangladesh.

In July 2022, he was named in Zimbabwe's squad for the 2022 ICC Men's T20 World Cup Global Qualifier B tournament which was held in Zimbabwe. He played a vital cog in Zimbabwe's golden run during the tournament where Zimbabwe defeated much fancied Netherlands in the final to secure a place for the 2022 ICC Men's T20 World Cup qualifying round. He was named the player of the match for his bowling prowess in the finals his sharp bowling of 4/8 including a maiden over restricted Dutch to 95 all out helping Zimbabwe to defend a modest total of 132. He was also awarded the Player of the Tournament for his all round prowess during the 2022 T20 World Cup Global Qualifier.

In August 2022, during the first of the three match ODI series against Bangladesh at home, Raza scored an unbeaten 135 to propel Zimbabwe to their first ever ODI win over Bangladesh since 2013 and he was awarded the player of the match award. His innings of 135* came in a competitive run chase of 304 and it is also the highest individual score by a batsman in ODI cricket in a successful run chase while batting at no 5 and lower. He along with teammate Innocent Kaia became only the second pair of batsmen for Zimbabwe after Stuart Carlisle and Sean Ervine to score centuries in the same ODI innings for Zimbabwe. Both Raza and Kaia added a crucial 192 run stand which was Zimbabwe's fourth highest ever partnership for any wicket. He also became only the second Zimbabwean after Craig Ervine to score two centuries in successful ODI run chases. He scored his second successive century in a row during the second ODI of the series. He was awarded player of the match for his strong all-round performance both with the bat and ball which helped Zimbabwe to win the match quite comprehensively by five wickets to take an unassailable 2–0 lead. He became the first Zimbabwean to score three ODI centuries in successful ODI run chases and became the first Zimbabwean to score two consecutive centuries in two successive successful ODI chases. During the second ODI, he also added 201 runs with Regis Chakabva for the fifth wicket to guide Zimbabwe into the driver's seat from a precarious position. It was also Zimbabwe's highest fifth wicket partnership in ODIs. He was awarded the player of the series for his heroics with the bat and ball throughout the series and it was incredibly Zimbabwe's first ODI series win over Bangladesh since 2013.

During the third and final ODI against India in August 2022, he played one of the most breathtaking counter-attacking knocks in ODI cricket by scoring 115 off just 95 balls (at one phase he moved from 46 to 100 in just 36 deliveries) and his knock included nine fours and three sixes with a strike rate boasting 121.05 despite his knock couldn't help Zimbabwe to cross the line. His knock certainly paved a way for a possible prospect of a shock win over India as Zimbabwe managed to overcome from 169/7 to within touching distance of a famous victory albeit Sikandar Raza's monumental century. However, India prevailed in the end soon after the dismissal of Raza whose marathon knock was brought to an end by a spectacular stunning diving catch from Shubman Gill in the penultimate over. Zimbabwe was bowled out for 276 runs thus falling short of the victory target by 14 runs denying a consolation win for the hosts. Raza subsequently joined an elite list of having scored the most number of ODI centuries in run chases in a single calendar year with only Sachin Tendulkar, Rohit Sharma and Virat Kohli ahead of him in that list. Raza became the first player to score three ODI centuries in ODI run chases in a same month of a calendar year as all three of his centuries in 2022 came in run chases in the month of August. Raza made the most out of 2022 in the shorter formats aggregating 615 runs in ODIs and 516 runs in T20Is.

On 20 June 2023, qualifier match against the Netherlands, Raza showed his all round performance. While bowling he took 4 wickets. While chasing down 315 runs, he scored his 7th and fastest ODI century for Zimbabwe. He scored unbeaten 102 runs from 54 deliveries hitting six boundaries and eight sixes. He guided Zimbabwe to a 6 wicket victory and due to his all round performance he won player of the match award.

On 23 October 2024, Raza became the first Zimbabwe player to score a T20I century when he made 133 not out off 43 balls against The Gambia, during the 2024 ICC Men's T20 World Cup Africa Sub-regional Qualifier B tournament in Nairobi, Kenya. In 2026, he led Zimbabwe into the super-8 in the 2026 Men's T20 World Cup and defeated Australia, knocking them out.
