= West Indian cricket team in Zimbabwe in 2022–23 =

International cricket tour

	Zimbabwe	West Indies
- Dates: 4 February – 16 February 2023
Captains	Craig Ervine	Kraigg Brathwaite

Test series
- Result: West Indies won the 2-match series 1–0
Most runs	Innocent Kaia (172)	Tagenarine Chanderpaul (258)
Most wickets	Brandon Mavuta (8)	Gudakesh Motie (19)
- Player of the series: Gudakesh Motie (WI)

The West Indies men's cricket team toured Zimbabwe in February 2023 to play two Test matches. In December 2022, the Zimbabwe Cricket (ZC) confirmed the fixtures. The first game of the series was Zimbabwe's first Test match after an 18-month gap since they played a home series against Bangladesh in July 2021 and the fourth time that the West Indies have toured Zimbabwe since 2000, with the most recent tour being in 2017; the tourists had won the three previous series without losing a Test match. West Indies won the series 1–0 after claiming an innings victory over Zimbabwe in the second Test.

== Squads ==
Zimbabwe	West Indies
Craig Ervine (c); Gary Ballance; Chamu Chibhabha; Tanaka Chivanga; Brad Evans; Joylord Gumbie (wk); Innocent Kaia; Tanunurwa Makoni; Wellington Masakadza; Kudzai Maunze; Brandon Mavuta; Richard Ngarava; Victor Nyauchi; Milton Shumba; Donald Tiripano; Tafadzwa Tsiga (wk)	Kraigg Brathwaite (c); Jermaine Blackwood (vc); Nkrumah Bonner; Tagenarine Chanderpaul; Roston Chase; Joshua Da Silva (wk); Shannon Gabriel; Jason Holder; Alzarri Joseph; Kyle Mayers; Gudakesh Motie; Raymon Reifer; Kemar Roach; Devon Thomas; Jomel Warrican

== Tour match ==
Before the start of the Test series, West Indies played a three-day warm-up fixture against a Zimbabwe XI side.

28–30 January 2023
Scorecard

West Indies	v	Zimbabwe XI
517 (132.5 overs); Kraigg Brathwaite 116* (170); Milton Shumba 3/80 (11.5 overs)		122 (56.3 overs); Timycen Maruma 37 (74); Alzarri Joseph 2/12 (4 overs)
82/2 (27.1 overs); Jermaine Blackwood 34* (49); Faraz Akram 1/4 (3 overs)

Match drawn
Bulawayo Athletic Club, Bulawayo
Umpires: Forster Mutizwa (Zim) and Christopher Phiri (Zim)

- Zimbabwe XI won the toss and elected to field.
- 23.3 overs of play was lost on Day 2 due to rain.

== Test series ==
=== 1st Test ===
4–8 February 2023
Scorecard

West Indies	v	Zimbabwe
447/6d (143 overs); Tagenarine Chanderpaul 207* (467); Brandon Mavuta 5/140 (41 overs)		379/9d (125 overs); Gary Ballance 137* (231); Alzarri Joseph 3/75 (26 overs)
203/5d (60 overs); Raymon Reifer 58 (106); Wellington Masakadza 3/71 (23 overs)		134/6 (54 overs); Chamu Chibhabha 31 (60); Gudakesh Motie 4/50 (24 overs)

Match drawn
Queens Sports Club, Bulawayo
Umpires: Paul Reiffel (Aus) and Langton Rusere (Zim) (Note: Iknow Chabi (Zim) replaced Langton Rusere as the on-field umpire from the start of the second day of the match.)
Player of the match: Tagenarine Chanderpaul (WI)

- West Indies won the toss and elected to bat.
- 39 and 52 overs of play was lost on Days 1 and 2 respectively due to rain.
- Brad Evans, Innocent Kaia, Tanunurwa Makoni and Tafadzwa Tsiga (Zim) all made their Test debuts.
- Gary Ballance made his Test debut for Zimbabwe after previously playing 23 Tests for England, becoming the 16th cricketer to represent two international teams in Tests.
- Kraigg Brathwaite and Tagenarine Chanderpaul (WI) scored the highest opening partnership for the West Indies in Tests.
- Tagenarine Chanderpaul scored his maiden century and double-century in Tests.
- Brandon Mavuta (Zim) took his first five-wicket haul in Tests.
- Gary Ballance (Zim) became only the second player, after Kepler Wessels, to score a century for two different teams in Tests.
- Kraigg Brathwaite and Tagenarine Chanderpaul became the first pair to bat on all five days of a Test match.

=== 2nd Test ===
12–16 February 2023 (Note: While five days of play were scheduled for each Test, the second Test reached a result in three days.)
Scorecard

Zimbabwe	v	West Indies
115 (40.5 overs); Innocent Kaia 38 (52); Gudakesh Motie 7/37 (14.5 overs)		292 (92.3 overs); Roston Chase 70 (132); Victor Nyauchi 5/56 (17.3 overs)
173 (47.3 overs); Craig Ervine 72 (105); Gudakesh Motie 6/62 (17.3 overs)

West Indies won by an innings and 4 runs
Queens Sports Club, Bulawayo
Umpires: Paul Reiffel (Aus) and Langton Rusere (Zim)
Player of the match: Gudakesh Motie (WI)

- Zimbabwe won the toss and elected to bat.
- 40.2 and 15 overs were lost on Days 2 and 3, respectively, due to rain.
- Tanaka Chivanga (Zim) made his Test debut.
- Gudakesh Motie (WI) took his first five-wicket haul in Tests.
- Victor Nyauchi (Zim) took his first five-wicket haul in Tests.
- Gudakesh Motie (13/99) recorded the best match figures by a spinner for the West Indies in Tests.
