= Guy Croxford =

Zimbabwean cricketer (born 1981)

Personal information
- Full name: Guy Mark Croxford
- Born: 2 June 1981 (age 45); Harare, Zimbabwe
- Batting: Right-handed
- Bowling: Right-arm medium
- Role: Batsman

Domestic team information
- Years: Team
- 2000/01–2001: CFX Academy cricket team
- 2002/03: Manicaland

Career statistics
| Competition | First-class | List A |
|---|---|---|
| Matches | 13 | 10 |
| Runs scored | 908 | 243 |
| Batting average | 43.23 | 24.30 |
| 100s/50s | 0/8 | 0/1 |
| Top score | 96* | 86 |
| Balls bowled | 441 | – |
| Wickets | 5 | – |
| Bowling average | 44.40 | – |
| 5 wickets in innings | 0 | – |
| 10 wickets in match | 0 | – |
| Best bowling | 2/4 | – |
| Catches/stumpings | 4/– | 2/– |
- Source: ESPNcricinfo, 7 December 2016

Guy Mark Croxford (born 2 June 1981) is a Zimbabwean former cricketer. He played thirteen first-class matches between 2000 and 2003.

== Biography ==
Croxford belongs to a cricketing family. His father was an opening bowler and his elder brother was a wicket-keeper batsman before a car accident ended his cricket career.

Croxford's initial cricket exposure came from his father's coaching, and he later learned his skills at Lilfordia School and Falcon College, scoring several centuries. While he used to bowl, he decided to focus more on batting, labelling himself as a part-time bowler.

Croxford was a consistent national age-group team member during his school years. His notable performances include scoring 168 runs against Border during the Under-14 tour to Potchefstroom and a century against Holland at the Under-15 World Cup in England. His highest score in any class of cricket was 168.

After school, he worked for his mother's flower export business during a gap year. He joined the CFX Academy in 2001 after a last-minute vacancy.
