= Shingirai Masakadza =

Zimbabwean cricketer (born 1986)

Personal information
- Full name: Shingirai Winston Masakadza
- Born: 4 September 1986 (age 40); Harare, Zimbabwe
- Nickname: Shingi
- Batting: Right-handed
- Bowling: Right-arm fast-medium
- Role: All-rounder
- Relatives: Hamilton Masakadza (brother); Wellington Masakadza (brother)

International information
- National side: Zimbabwe
- Test debut (cap 83): 26 January 2012 v West Indies
- Last Test: 12 November 2014 v Bangladesh
- ODI debut (cap 108): 4 March 2010 v South Africa
- Last ODI: 17 August 2014 v South Africa
- T20I debut (cap 22): 28 February 2010 v West Indies
- Last T20I: 24 August 2013 v Pakistan

Domestic team information
- Years: Team
- 2007/08–2008/09: Easterns
- 2009/10–: Mountaineers

Career statistics
Competition	Test	ODI	T20I	FC
Matches	5	16	7	107
Runs scored	88	170	18	2,975
Batting average	11.00	21.25	4.50	21.25
100s/50s	0/0	0/0	0/0	2/16
Top score	24	45*	9	140
Balls bowled	1,057	791	117	15,463
Wickets	16	25	4	337
Bowling average	32.18	35.64	52.75	23.72
5 wickets in innings	0	0	0	12
10 wickets in match	0	0	0	0
Best bowling	4/32	4/46	2/39	6/54
Catches/stumpings	2/–	7/–	2/–	71/–
- Source: CricketArchive, 12 April 2025

Shingirai Winston Masakadza (born 4 September 1986) is a cricketer and former professional footballer from Zimbabwe. The brother of former Zimbabwe cricket captain Hamilton Masakadza, he is a pace bowler and middle-order batsmen. After making his first class debut for Easterns in 2008, he was called up to the Zimbabwe squad to face the West Indies in the Caribbean in February 2010. Before becoming a full-time cricketer, Massakadza played football for Dynamos, one of Zimbabwe's most popular clubs.

In the summer of 2022, Shingi played for Ackworth Cricket Club in the Yorkshire Cricket Southern Premier League. He played a pivotal role in the team getting promoted at the first attempt after winning the division

== Domestic career ==
In December 2020, he was selected to play for the Mountaineers in the 2020–21 Logan Cup.

== International career ==
He made his ODI debut in Providence, and after Zimbabwe posted a competitive score of 256/5, Shingirai held his nerve in the final over of the match, to take two wickets as Zimbabwe pulled off a two-run victory, with Masakadza ending with figures of 3/36, taking the wickets of Shivnarine Chanderpaul, Dwayne Smith and Sulieman Benn. His name was then included in the squad that would play Ireland in August 2010. He scored 46 not out as Zimbabwe lost the match but won the series 2–1. Masakadaza was played as a replacement for Charles Coventry in that match.

He was subsequently selected for the two match T20 series against South Africa and participated in the Second T20 at the expense of Ed Rainsford. Masakadza clean bowled David Miller and also took the wicket of Robin Peterson against a weakened South Africa who were without Dale Steyn, Jacques Kallis and Morne Morkel. In the subsequent ODI series he took 4 wickets in his opening match, the wickets being of Graeme Smith, Colin Ingram, Albie Morkel and David Miller.

Masakadza was included in Zimbabwe's squad for the 2011 World Cup, and played in one match, Zimbabwe's seven-wicket defeat to Pakistan.

He along with Ian Nicolson set the record for the highest last-wicket stand in ODIs for Zimbabwe(60)
