= Kevan Barbour =

Zimbabwean international cricket umpire

Kevan Christopher Barbour (born 23 October 1949) is an international cricket umpire from Zimbabwe. Previously, he has served as the president, chairman and provincial manager of the Manicaland Cricket Association.

== Early life ==
Barbour was born in Bulawayo and educated at Milton High School. He played for Matabeleland from 1968 until 1970, when he moved to work in Mutare, and then played for Manicaland until 1975. He also played for the Rhodesia B cricket team. After a further move to Kwekwe, he played for Midlands until 1977. He settled back in Mutare and played for Manicaland again until 1979.

== Retired ==
Barbour retired as a cricketer in 1996, and took up umpiring. He made his international umpiring debut in 1998 during an ODI game between Zimbabwe and Pakistan, before making his Test umpiring debut in the 1st Test between Zimbabwe and Sri Lanka at Bulawayo in November 1999. He umpired three further Tests in 2001, all in Zimbabwe: the 1st Test against Bangladesh at Bulawayo in April 2001, the 2nd Test against West Indies at Harare in July 2001, and then the 2nd Test against South Africa at Bulawayo in September 2001. He was an umpire at the 2003 Cricket World Cup.

As of August 2010, he has umpired four Tests and 51 ODIs, most recently standing in an ODI in October 2009. Save for two World Cup ODIs in South Africa, and three other ODIs in Sharjah in 2003, all have been played in Zimbabwe, and all but a handful involving the Zimbabwe national cricket team. Barbour has also been the third umpire in six Tests in Zimbabwe, most recently in 2005, and 29 ODIs.

== See also ==
- List of Test cricket umpires
- List of One Day International cricket umpires
