= Vusi Sibanda =

Zimbabwean cricketer (born 1983)

Personal information
- Full name: Vusimuzi Sibanda
- Born: 10 October 1983 (age 43); Highfield, Harare, Zimbabwe
- Batting: Right-handed
- Bowling: Right-arm medium
- Role: Opening batsman

International information
- National side: Zimbabwe (2003-2016)
- Test debut (cap 60): 4 November 2003 v West Indies
- Last Test: 25 October 2014 v Bangladesh
- ODI debut (cap 75): 22 November 2003 v West Indies
- Last ODI: 15 June 2016 v India
- ODI shirt no.: 46
- T20I debut (cap 13): 12 September 2007 v Australia
- Last T20I: 12 March 2016 v Afghanistan
- T20I shirt no.: 10 (previously 26, 46)

Domestic team information
- Years: Team
- 2002–2006: Midlands
- 2009–: Mid West Rhinos
- Takashinga

Career statistics
| Competition | Test | ODI | T20I | FC |
|---|---|---|---|---|
| Matches | 14 | 127 | 25 | 125 |
| Runs scored | 591 | 2,994 | 483 | 7,341 |
| Batting average | 21.10 | 24.54 | 20.12 | 33.36 |
| 100s/50s | 0/2 | 2/21 | 0/1 | 18/31 |
| Top score | 93 | 116 | 59 | 217 |
| Balls bowled | – | 267 | – | 2,696 |
| Wickets | – | 3 | – | 38 |
| Bowling average | – | 88.33 | – | 42.71 |
| 5 wickets in innings | – | 0 | – | 1 |
| 10 wickets in match | – | 0 | – | 0 |
| Best bowling | – | 1/12 | – | 5/55 |
| Catches/stumpings | 16/– | 42/– | 12/– | 147/– |
- Source: ESPNcricinfo, 15 June 2017

Vusimuzi "Vusi" Sibanda (born 10 October 1983) is a Zimbabwean cricketer. He has played international cricket for the Zimbabwe in all three formats of the game. He also played for Midlands in the Logan Cup.

== Early career ==
Sibanda is a right-handed opening batsman who showed potential as a teenager, graduating from the Zimbabwe Cricket Academy and being fast-tracked into the national team.

He grew up in Highfields, Harare, was spotted early on by developmental coaches, and earned a scholarship to Churchill Boys High. He plays domestic cricket for Mid West Rhinos.

== International career ==
He made his One Day International (ODI) debut in 2003 against the West Indies and made 58. Sibanda however struggled at international level from there on in, not scoring another half century for 18 innings, making at one stage 3 consecutive ducks.

In May 2005 his place in the national team came under threat by the imminent return of the 'rebel' Zimbabwean cricketers who had earlier walked out on the team in a dispute with Zimbabwe Cricket. The return was unsuccessful and Sibanda again became a regular at the top of the order for Zimbabwe, making his maiden ODI hundred in 2006 against Bermuda in the Caribbean Tri Nations Tournament.

He made a return to international cricket (although he denied ever retiring) for the Africa XI in the 2007 Afro-Asia Cup. He played in two of the three ODIs, scoring 80 runs at an average of 40.00. Although Sibanda was not playing initially in the 2011 Cricket World Cup an injury to Sean Williams meant a call-up for him. He scored 61 off 57 balls in an innings that included 7 fours. Zimbabwe reached 308/6.

Sibanda was included to the 2016 ICC World Twenty20 for Zimbabwe as the opening batsman with skipper Hamilton Masakadza. He scored his maiden T20I fifty of 59 from 54 balls against Hong Kong on 8 March 2016, during first match of group B in qualifying round. Zimbabwe won the match by 14 runs and Sibanda won man of the match award as well.

== Career summary ==
=== Tests ===
Test Debut: vs West Indies, Harare, 2003–2004
Latest Test: vs New Zealand, Bulawayo, 2011–2012

- Sibanda's best Test score of 93 was made against New Zealand, Harare, 2011.

=== One-day internationals ===
ODI Debut: vs West Indies, Bulawayo, 2003–2004
Latest ODI: vs Asia XI, Chennai, 2007

- Sibanda's best ODI score of 116
- His best ODI bowling figures of 1 for 12 came against England, Birmingham, ICC Champions Trophy 2004
