= Christopher Mpofu =

Zimbabwean cricketer

Chris Mpofu
Personal information
- Full name: Christopher Bobby Mpofu
- Born: 27 November 1985 (age 40); Plumtree, Matebeleland, Zimbabwe
- Batting: Right-handed
- Bowling: Right-arm medium-fast
- Role: Bowler

International information
- National side: Zimbabwe (2004–2020)
- Test debut (cap 68): 6 January 2005 v Bangladesh
- Last Test: 26 December 2017 v South Africa
- ODI debut (cap 84): 28 November 2004 v England
- Last ODI: 1 March 2020 v Bangladesh
- ODI shirt no.: 28
- T20I debut (cap 22): 9 January 2007 v England
- Last T20I: 11 March 2020 v Bangladesh
- T20I shirt no.: 28

Domestic team information
- Years: Team
- 2003/04–2005/06: Matabaleland
- 2003/04: Mashonaland
- 2006/07–2008/09: Westerns
- 2009/10–2017/18: Matabeleland Tuskers

Career statistics
Competition	Test	ODI	T20I	FC
Matches	15	84	32	111
Runs scored	105	57	35	1,250
Batting average	5.83	2.85	8.75	10.00
100s/50s	0/0	0/0	0/0	0/1
Top score	33	9*	17*	57
Balls bowled	2,489	3,960	694	17,422
Wickets	29	93	33	296
Bowling average	48.00	38.50	31.36	30.18
5 wickets in innings	0	1	0	12
10 wickets in match	0	0	0	1
Best bowling	4/92	6/52	4/30	7/37
Catches/stumpings	4/–	11/–	5/–	29/–
- Source: ESPNcricinfo, 13 March 2023

Christopher Bobby Mpofu (born 27 November 1985) is a Zimbabwean former international cricketer. He played for the Zimbabwe national cricket team at Test, One Day International and Twenty20 International level.

== Early life and career ==
Mpofu spent time in Brisbane, Australia at the National Performance Centre. He was coached by former Australian fast bowler Damien Fleming.

Mpofu made his first-class debut for Matabeleland against Manicaland in March 2004, taking three wickets on debut. In the 2004/05 Faithwear Inter-Clothing Provincial One-Day Competition, Mpofu was the leading wicket-taker with 11 wickets. He claimed 9 wickets in the 2005/06 edition of the competition.

== International career ==
Following the mass exodus of top level players in the Zimbabwean cricket crisis of 2004, Mpofu made his One-Day International debut against England, and cost the English team some anxious moments.

Following the exodus of the rebels, Mpofu was given his Test debut against Bangladesh at the M. A. Aziz Stadium, Chittagong. He had scores of 0 and 5 in the match. The match was an indication of Zimbabwe's horrific decline in Tests as Bangladesh secured their maiden Test victory, and that too by 226 runs.

He was stumped twice in an afternoon (for a pair) in the first Test against New Zealand in August 2005, he followed up by being run out for 3 in the second match, as he strolled down the pitch to congratulate his teammate Blessing Mahwire on reaching his half-century, with the ball still in action. He still tends to blow hot and cold and has few rivals in the race to be considered international cricket's worst batsman.

Despite containing the basics, a good away movement, and a good action, Mpofu struggled, as for a long time he was the lone seamer among a cluster of spinners, and he had no one to help him out, and consistency was a major problem for the young seamer. There was a game against Pakistan in which he took 1/75.

=== International comeback ===
As Mpofu later recalled, Zimbabwe's short tour of South Africa in 2010 was the most toughest part of his life. On flat batting pitches without any assistance to seamers, Mpofu recorded unflattering bowling figures of 1 for 59 in the Twenty20 match in Kimberley, and 0/59 in a One-Day International at Bloemfontein. Mpofu later said that he thought about Mick Lewis in that 438-game and how he never played for Australia again, and whether the same fate would befall Mpofu too.

It was former Zimbabwean fast-bowling great Heath Streak who helped Mpofu believe he could. When Streak was appointed as bowling coach, Mpofu had a sense that things were changing. The two had a more good understanding because Streak who also came from Matabeleland as Mpofu spoke in his mother language, Ndebele. Streak told Mpofu that in cricket, he needed a wider repoirtoire of balls. Furthermore, former English Test cricketer Robin Jackman told him after his disastrous performances in South Africa that if he had to succeed in international cricket, he will have to bowl a slower ball. Mpofu first tried that experiment in the nets, and following success there, tried them in an international match situation. This chain of incidents proved to be a turning point in Mpofu's career.

A string of decent performances followed in the 2010 tri-series against India and Sri Lanka, as Zimbabwe beat India (twice) and Sri Lanka (once) to reach the final ahead of favorites India, ultimately finishing as runners-up. Mpofu continued in the same vein in the team's tour of Ireland. Mpofu took 8 wickets from these two combined series.

=== 2011 Cricket World Cup ===
Mpofu had a fine World Cup 2011 performance, with 7 wickets at an average of 22.71 from 4 matches and eased into a more senior role for Zimbabwe. Furthermore, he found a new-ball partner with Ray Price and created a new celebration jig with him as any one of them got a wicket.

=== Mid career (2010-2015) ===
Mpofu played in Zimbabwe's comeback Test match against Bangladesh, and took 5 wickets as Zimbabwe recorded their first victory since 2004 by a major 130 runs.

Chris Mpofu continued his good wicket-taking form in the next Test against Pakistan, by taking 2 wickets in the only innings he bowled. Another highlight being his six in the Zimbabwean first innings off Pakistan's stalwart spinner Saeed Ajmal that brought up the Zimbabwean 400. Despite this, the match was a heavy 7-wicket loss for the hosts who were playing at Bulawayo.

Mpofu continued his fine form in the next Test against New Zealand where he took 4 wickets in a single innings to restrict New Zealand to 426. He eventually finished with another 5-wicket haul. Despite captain Brendan Taylor's brilliant innings of 117 in the last innings, Zimbabwe lost the match narrowly by 34 runs, owing much to Black Caps debutant Doug Bracewell's 5-wicket haul that overshadowed Mpofu's and Kyle Jarvis's.

Chris Mpofu was left out of the Zimbabwe squad for the 2015 ICC Cricket World Cup in Australia.

== Records ==
- He is the world record holder for conceding the fewest runs (6 runs) without bowling a maiden over in a T20 International after bowling the complete quota of overs.
