= Kyle Jarvis =

Zimbabwean cricketer

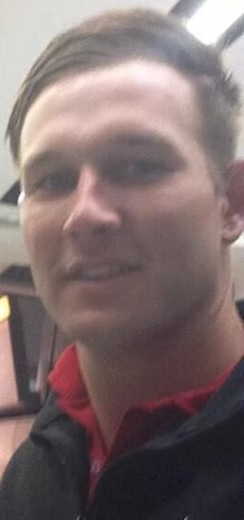
- Jarvis in 2013

Personal information
- Full name: Kyle Malcolm Jarvis
- Born: 16 February 1989 (age 37); Harare, Zimbabwe
- Height: 6 ft 3 in (1.91 m)
- Batting: Right-handed
- Bowling: Right-arm fast-medium
- Role: Bowler
- Relatives: Malcolm Jarvis (father)

International information
- National side: Zimbabwe (2009–2020)
- Test debut (cap 76): 4 August 2011 v Bangladesh
- Last Test: 19 January 2020 v Sri Lanka
- ODI debut (cap 105): 12 October 2009 v Kenya
- Last ODI: 7 July 2019 v Ireland
- ODI shirt no.: 8
- T20I debut (cap 28): 16 September 2011 v Pakistan
- Last T20I: 20 September 2019 v Afghanistan

Domestic team information
- Years: Team
- 2009/10–2012/13: Mashonaland Eagles
- 2011/12–2012/13: Central Districts
- 2013–2017: Lancashire
- 2014/15–2018/19: Mid West Rhinos
- 2019/20: Rangers

Career statistics
| Competition | Test | ODI | T20I | FC |
|---|---|---|---|---|
| Matches | 13 | 49 | 22 | 84 |
| Runs scored | 128 | 222 | 55 | 1,153 |
| Batting average | 9.14 | 9.65 | 7.85 | 14.23 |
| 100s/50s | 0/0 | 0/0 | 0/0 | 0/1 |
| Top score | 25* | 37 | 27 | 57 |
| Balls bowled | 2,511 | 2,362 | 448 | 15,119 |
| Wickets | 46 | 58 | 28 | 320 |
| Bowling average | 29.43 | 36.00 | 23.75 | 25.57 |
| 5 wickets in innings | 3 | 0 | 0 | 18 |
| 10 wickets in match | 0 | 0 | 0 | 2 |
| Best bowling | 5/54 | 4/17 | 3/15 | 7/35 |
| Catches/stumpings | 3/– | 11/– | 5/– | 23/– |
- Source: Cricinfo, 19 June 2021

Kyle Malcolm Jarvis (born 16 February 1989) is a Zimbabwean former cricketer who represented Zimbabwe and played for Lancashire. The son of another former Zimbabwean international cricketer Malcolm Jarvis, he was educated at St John's College, Harare, where he excelled at rugby and cricket. Kyle was a key bowler for Zimbabwe in the 2008 Under-19 World Cup and he also played for the Zimbabwe U-19 Rugby Team. He was coached by Zimbabwean veteran seamer Heath Streak. He was one of the fastest bowlers to have played for Zimbabwe bowling at 140 km/h very often during his early career. On 17 June 2021, Jarvis retired from all forms of cricket after battling a trio of illnesses earlier this year.

== Career ==
Jarvis was first called up to the Zimbabwe squad even before he had made his first-class debut, for the ODI series against the touring Kenyan team in 2009. He received his maiden national call up and was fast tracked into the national team after the appointment of Heath Streak as the then bowling coach for Zimbabwe as well as following a string of impressive performances with the ball during the 2008 Under-19 Cricket World Cup. The squad also marked a comeback for star wicketkeeper-batsman Tatenda Taibu in the national team. Jarvis was also picked for the Zimbabwe XI to play the Kenyans in the ICC Intercontinental Cup fixture and made his first-class debut in the same match. Jarvis made his ODI debut on 12 October 2009 against Kenya at Harare during the first ODI of the series. He took 3 wickets for just 36 runs. He eventually took 5 wickets on tour at an economy rate of 5.78.

Following his performances on his maiden tour, Jarvis was picked for the tour to Bangladesh in 2009. The tour was not particularly good for Jarvis taking just five wickets from four matches, at a cost of 161 runs. An economy rate of 6.00 was only better than part-timer Malcolm Waller's 7.50; his bowling average of 32.20.

Jarvis made his first-class debut in an ICC Intercontinental Cup fixture against Kenya played out at the Kwekwe Sports Club. Jarvis took 2 wickets on debut. He made his debut Logan Cup match for Mashonaland Eagles, taking match figures of 6/60.

Jarvis made his Test cricket debut for Zimbabwe against Bangladesh at Harare on 4 August 2011. The match marked Zimbabwe's return to Test cricket after a six-year absence. He went on to play in Zimbabwe's one-off Tests against Pakistan and New Zealand later in 2011, taking a five-wicket haul (5–64) in the second innings of the New Zealand Test. He was part of the Zimbabwe squad which competed at the 2012 ICC World Twenty20 which was held in Sri Lanka.

After the New Zealand home series, Jarvis was included on the Zimbabwean tour to the West Indies in March 2013, where he bettered his 5 wickets for 64 runs against New Zealand with a new Test best of 5 for 54 in the first Test at the Kensington Oval in Bridgetown, Barbados. He subsequently played in the ODI and T20 fixtures on that tour.

Jarvis was also picked in the April 2013 series against the touring Bangladeshis. He took nine wickets in the two match Test series, at an average of 33.33, with an innings best of 4–40 in the first Test at the Harare Sports Club. He also featured in the ODI series against Bangladesh, playing two out of the three matches but only managing to take three wickets at an average of 38.33. He did not play any of the subsequent T20 matches.

On 18 August 2013, Jarvis announced he had retired from international cricket to pursue a county contract with Lancashire in England as a non overseas player, at a time when there was a standoff between Zimbabwe players and the Zimbabwe Cricket regarding the payment structure prior to Zimbabwe's home series against Pakistan. He was reported to have signed a Kolpak deal with Lancashire in late 2015. During his stint with Lancashire, he impressed with ball ending up as the top wicket taker for Lancashire with 62 wickets in the Division 2 of the 2015 County Championship and also ended up as the leading wicket taker for Lancashire with 51 scalps in the Division 1 of the 2016 County Championship and in his final year with Lancashire, he managed to pick 36 wickets at an average of 22.33. He was named as Lancashire club's player of the championship in 2015 for his breathtaking performance with the ball in the 2015 county season which also helped Lancashire club to be promoted from Division 2 to Division 1 of the County Championship.

In September 2017, Jarvis left Lancashire, to return to Zimbabwe to play international cricket. He ended his stint with Lancashire prematurely although he was contracted to play for the county side until 2018. In October 2017, he was included in Zimbabwe's Test squad for series against West Indies. He made a brief cricket return and picked 1-40. Against Bangladesh in 2018 he took figures 5-71 and 2-27. In an interview with Cricinfo in 2018, he stated that Australian pacer Glenn McGrath was his childhood hero and revealed that he modelled his bowling action similar to McGrath. He also stated that he had relied on his slow bowling around 130 km/h in his later career because of not being consistent enough to deliver around 140 km/h as well as to manage the workload and injury concerns. He was also part of the Zimbabwean squad which played at the 2018 Cricket World Cup Qualifier which was held in Zimbabwe.

In January 2020, Jarvis was ruled out from the second test match against Sri Lanka after suffering a back injury and muscle spasms in the first test of the series. He underwent significant rehabilitation for months after suffering back injury in 2020. However, in February 2021 it was revealed that Jarvis had been diagnosed with trio of illness at the same time including COVID-19, malaria and tick bite fever which forced him to take a break from cricket for a period of six months and underwent medical treatment at the Borrowdale Trauma Centre in Harare. He was reportedly tested positive for COVID-19 in January 2021 after completing a training session. On 17 June 2021, in a press conference with Zimbabwe Cricket, he announced his retirement from international cricket at the age of 32 citing illness and fitness issues. He is set to pursue his career following his retirement, focusing on new personal business ventures including planning to build a restaurant and carrying on with a vehicle import-export business.
