= Ray Price (cricketer) =

Zimbabwean cricketer (born 1976)

Personal information
- Full name: Raymond William Price
- Born: 12 June 1976 (age 50); Salisbury, Rhodesia
- Height: 183 cm (6 ft 0 in)
- Batting: Right-handed
- Bowling: Slow left arm orthodox
- Role: Bowler

International information
- National side: Zimbabwe
- Test debut (cap 43): 4 December 1999 v Sri Lanka
- Last Test: 14 March 2013 v West Indies
- ODI debut (cap 69): 14 September 2002 v India
- Last ODI: 9 February 2012 v New Zealand
- ODI shirt no.: 7
- T20I debut (cap 17): 10 October 2008 v Sri Lanka
- Last T20I: 20 September 2012 v South Africa

Domestic team information
- Years: Team
- 1999-2004: Midlands
- 2005–2007: Worcestershire
- 2007/08: Mashonaland
- 2009–2013: Mashonaland Eagles (squad no. 15)
- 2011: Mumbai Indians

Career statistics
Competition	Test	ODI	T20I	FC
Matches	22	102	16	118
Runs scored	261	406	15	2,512
Batting average	8.70	9.66	3.00	16.31
100s/50s	0/0	0/0	0/0	1/11
Top score	36	46	7*	117*
Balls bowled	6,135	5,374	369	27,899
Wickets	80	100	13	416
Bowling average	36.06	35.75	29.07	29.17
5 wickets in innings	5	0	0	20
10 wickets in match	1	0	0	3
Best bowling	6/73	4/22	2/6	8/35
Catches/stumpings	4/–	17/–	3/–	61/–
- Source: ESPNcricinfo, 14 March 2013

Raymond William Price (born 12 June 1976) is a former Zimbabwean international cricketer. He bowls left-arm orthodox spin. He is the nephew of the renowned Zimbabwean golfer Nick Price.

== Early life ==
Price was born two months premature and contracted meningitis when he was a few months old. He was given only a one in four chance of survival, but managed to beat the odds. However, although it was not realised for some time, he was left totally deaf by the disease. When he was four, an operation helped him regain his hearing, but left him with terrible coordination difficulties. He was consequently some way behind his age group when he went to school.

Price first played cricket with friends in his back garden. When he was at primary school he was a pace bowler, but took up spin at Watershed College, a boarding school near Marondera. He gradually got better and better at cricket, ending up as a key figure for the school team.

== Early career ==
He had attracted the attention of the Mashonaland County Districts cricket side, and he made his first-class debut in 1995/6, although only as an amateur. He was a trained installer of refrigeration and air conditioning units during this period of his career.

Price began to impress the Zimbabwe selectors and, when an injury and form crisis robbed Zimbabwe of the first-choice spinner Paul Strang, Adam Huckle and Andy Whittall, they selected him for the third Test of the series against Sri Lanka in 1999/2000.

He became a marginal figure in the squad, sometimes he played and sometimes he did not, however in 2001/02 he began to put in some good performances for the national side, including 5–181, his first Test five-wicket haul, against South Africa at Bulawayo and 4–116 against Pakistan at the same ground.

== Gaining attention ==
In 2003 Price toured England and impressed everyone who saw him bowl. He was rated as a better spinner than the English spinner Ashley Giles. It was in that winter's tour of Australia, however, that Ray truly established himself as a world-class bowler, taking 6–121 in the second Test at Sydney. Against the West Indies back home that winter Price ran through their strong batting line-up twice, taking 6–73 and 4–88 in the first Test at Harare and then again in Bulawayo, taking 5–119 and 4–36. He played a pivotal role in Zimbabwe's series win over Bangladesh that winter too, taking 8 wickets in two Tests. He was becoming disaffected with the politicisation of Zimbabwean cricket however, and in 2004 he joined the player rebellion led by captain Heath Streak. Soon afterwards he signed for Worcestershire and announced an ambition to play for England.

Price has built up a devoted following among supporters of other counties. His appearance at the 2005 Bath Festival was met with jubilation by his fans as they chanted his name throughout the day. His clever left arm spin bamboozled Somerset that day as 'Ray's Barmy Army' went through a selection of pop hits based on the popular Zimbabwe international.

== Late career ==
In 2006 Price revealed to the Press Association that he hoped to play international cricket again – for England after the required qualification period.

In 2007 he made a surprise return to Zimbabwe, and played in several National League matches for Old Hararians. Some believed this might have been a hint to the national selectors, with the 2007 World Cup approaching. However, he was not selected for the Zimbabwe squad.

Price rejected a one-year contract with Worcestershire at the end of the 2007 season, ending his three-and-a-half-year spell at the club.

In late 2007, he officially returned to the Zimbabwe team. He was selected for the Zimbabwe squad to play the West Indies. Ever since, he has been a regular and influential member of the team, used to dry up runs and to take crucial wickets. He has been one of many rebel cricketers who have returned due to the improving situation in Zimbabwe. He has had a superb comeback to the Zimbabwe cricket team, rising to 3rd in the ICC Cricket ODI Bowling Rankings, taking 45 wickets in just 27 matches, while bowling very economically. He played in all ODIs for Zimbabwe in 2009, against the South Africa national cricket team, the Bangladesh cricket team, the Sri Lanka national cricket team and the Kenya cricket team. Price was unsold at the original IPL 2011 player auction in January and Mumbai Indians bought him at his reserve price of $50,000, in place of the injured Moises Henriques. He became only the second Zimbabwean to play in the IPL.

Later in 2011, Price was selected to play in all three of Zimbabwe's one-off Tests against Bangladesh, Pakistan and New Zealand, after Zimbabwe's five-year hiatus from Test cricket. He took ten wickets over the three matches.

Price ended his international career on 14 March 2013 during a test match against West Indies.
