= Hamilton Masakadza =

Zimbabwean cricketer (born 1983)

Personal information
- Born: 9 August 1983 (age 43); Harare, Zimbabwe
- Height: 6 ft 3 in (1.91 m)
- Batting: Right-handed
- Bowling: Right-arm medium
- Role: Top-order batter
- Relatives: Shingi Masakadza (brother); Wellington Masakadza (brother)

International information
- National side: Zimbabwe (2001–2019)
- Test debut (cap 53): 27 July 2001 v West Indies
- Last Test: 11 November 2018 v Bangladesh
- ODI debut (cap 65): 23 September 2001 v South Africa
- Last ODI: 7 July 2019 v Ireland
- ODI shirt no.: 3
- T20I debut (cap 6): 28 November 2006 v Bangladesh
- Last T20I: 20 September 2019 v Afghanistan
- T20I shirt no.: 3

Domestic team information
- Years: Team
- 1999/00–2004/05: Manicaland
- 200/01: Mashonaland
- 2003/04: Matabeleland
- 2006/07–2008/09: Easterns
- 2009/10–2017/18: Mountaineers
- 2013: Sylhet Royals
- 2017: Amo Sharks

Career statistics
Competition	Test	ODI	T20I	FC
Matches	38	209	66	140
Runs scored	2,223	5,658	1,662	9,564
Batting average	30.04	27.73	25.96	39.85
100s/50s	5/8	5/34	0/11	23/44
Top score	158	178*	93*	208*
Balls bowled	1,152	1,844	72	4,130
Wickets	16	39	2	62
Bowling average	30.56	41.94	56.50	29.53
5 wickets in innings	0	0	0	0
10 wickets in match	0	0	0	0
Best bowling	3/24	3/39	1/4	4/11
Catches/stumpings	29/0	71/–	25/–	124/–
- Source: ESPNcricinfo, 20 September 2019

Hamilton Masakadza (born 9 August 1983) is a Zimbabwean former cricketer, who played all formats of the game for Zimbabwe. He captained the national team during 2016 ICC World T20, but was relieved of his duties following an indifferent team performance in the tournament, where they failed to get past the qualifying round. In February 2019, Zimbabwe Cricket confirmed that Masakadza would captain the national side across all three formats for the 2019–20 season.

He was a right-handed batsman and occasional right-arm medium-pace bowler. His brothers, Shingirai Masakadza and Wellington Masakadza, also played for Zimbabwe; all three have played domestically for the Mountaineers.

He became the first player to score multiple 150-plus scores in a series or tournament, where he achieved the feat against Kenya in 2009. In October 2018, during Zimbabwe's tour to South Africa, Masakadza became the fourth cricketer for Zimbabwe to play in 200 One Day International (ODI) matches.

In September 2019, Masakadza announced that he would retire from international cricket following the conclusion of the 2019–20 Bangladesh Tri-Nation Series. On 20 September 2019, he played in his final international cricket match for Zimbabwe, against Afghanistan. In October 2019, Masakadza was appointed as Zimbabwe Cricket's director of cricket.

== Early and domestic career ==
In February 2000, aged just 16 and still a schoolboy at Churchill School, Masakadza became the first black Zimbabwean, and the youngest player to score a first-class century. He made his Test debut soon after, in July 2001, against the West Indies in Harare. In his team's second innings, he made 119, thus becoming – at the age of 17 years and 354 days – the youngest player to make a century on his Test debut. However, he held this record for less than two months, before it was broken by Bangladesh's Mohammad Ashraful.

After briefly putting his professional cricket career on hold to study at the University of the Free State, Masakadza was recalled to the national team in late 2004 following the rebel crisis, and has maintained a regular presence since.

He was the leading run-scorer for Mountaineers in the 2017–18 Pro50 Championship, with 317 runs in six matches.

== International career ==
During the team's six-year exile from Test cricket (2005–2011), he increased his ability in One Day Internationals. His first century in this format came on 14 August 2009, against Bangladesh in Bulawayo, and in October 2009 he made scores of 156 and 178 not out in a home ODI series against Kenya – thus becoming the first Zimbabwean to make two scores of 150 or more in ODIs, and the first player from any country to make two such scores in the same series. He has the record for scoring the most runs in a five-match ODI series (467)

When Zimbabwe made its return to Test cricket in August 2011, playing a one-off match against Bangladesh in Harare, Masakadza made 104 in the first innings – thus making his second Test century ten years after his first. In 2015, he made his first appearance in the senior Cricket World Cup, having previously made two appearances in the Under-19 version (in 2000 and 2002).

In 2014, he along with Sikandar Raza, set the record for the highest ever partnership for Zimbabwe in ODIs. (224 for the first wicket)

As of November 2015, Masakadza is Zimbabwe's sixth-highest Test run-scorer and fifth-highest ODI run-scorer. He is also the country's leading Twenty20 International run-scorer, becoming the first Zimbabwean to reach 1,000 runs in this format on 29 September 2015.

In Zimbabwe's tour of Bangladesh in January 2016, Masakadza set a world record for the most runs scored in a T20I bilateral series, with a total of 222 across four games.

Following India's tour to Zimbabwe in June 2016, Masakadza became the first Zimbabwean cricketer to play in 50 Twenty20 International matches.

== Post-retirement ==
In August 2019, Zimbabwe Cricket initiated a new role called director of cricket with the intention of restructuring its management, and Hamilton Masakadza was appointed as the first director of cricket at Zimbabwe Cricket. In October 2019, Hamilton assumed his duties as Zimbabwe Cricket's director of cricket. He was given the task of defining policy, strategy, and programs of best practice by all of Zimbabwe's teams during his tenure.

In March 2024, after serving as Zimbabwe Cricket's director of cricket for five years, he resigned from the position as a result of Zimbabwe's failure to qualify for the 2024 ICC Men's T20 World Cup.
