= Malcolm Waller =

Zimbabwean cricketer

Personal information
- Full name: Malcolm Noel Waller
- Born: 28 September 1984 (age 42); Harare, Zimbabwe
- Batting: Right-handed
- Bowling: Right-arm off-break
- Role: Batsman
- Relatives: Andy Waller (father); Nathan Waller (cousin)

International information
- National side: Zimbabwe (2009-2018)
- Test debut (cap 82): 1 November 2011 v New Zealand
- Last Test: 29 October 2017 v West Indies
- ODI debut (cap 102): 19 January 2009 v Bangladesh
- Last ODI: 6 March 2018 v Afghanistan
- ODI shirt no.: 9
- T20I debut (cap 30): 15 October 2011 v New Zealand
- Last T20I: 6 July 2018 v Australia
- T20I shirt no.: 9

Career statistics
Competition	Test	ODI	T20I	FC
Matches	14	79	32	80
Runs scored	577	1,259	613	4,700
Batting average	21.37	19.07	26.65	36.43
100s/50s	0/4	0/5	0/1	11/22
Top score	72*	99*	68	208*
Balls bowled	456	666	30	4,672
Wickets	8	10	0	62
Bowling average	27.25	56.60	–	40.00
5 wickets in innings	0	0	0	1
10 wickets in match	0	0	0	0
Best bowling	4/59	2/44	–	5/48
Catches/stumpings	10/–	22/–	9/–	55/–
- Source: ESPNCricinfo, 17 January 2019

Malcolm Noel Waller (born 28 September 1984) is a Zimbabwean professional cricketer, who plays all formats of the game. He is a middle-order batsman and off-spinner. In December 2014, he was suspended from bowling after the International Cricket Council (ICC) concluded that "all of his off-spin deliveries exceeded the 15 degrees level of tolerance permitted under the regulations".

In August 2015 his action was found to be legal and the next month he was selected in Zimbabwe's squad for their series against Pakistan.

== International career ==
Following his first-class debut in the Logan Cup in April 2008, Waller was called up to the national team for a tour of Bangladesh, where he made his international debut in a One Day International on 19 January 2009. Chasing a mere 128, Zimbabwe were in trouble at 44/6 when Waller walked in and drove the first ball he faced through the covers for four. He played a few more shots and was the top scorer in the innings with 24. With Ray Price's entertaining shots in the end Zimbabwe eventually won by 2 wickets.

Waller rose to fame when he helped Zimbabwe chase down their highest ever ODI target of 328 against New Zealand at Bulawayo in the third ODI. He remained unbeaten on 99 as he chased down a total of more than 300 for the first time in Zimbabwe's history.

=== Test Debut against New Zealand, 2011 ===
Following this, he made his Test debut against New Zealand in the only Test at Bulawayo on 1 November 2011. Waller remained unbeaten on 72 and became the eleventh Zimbabwean to score 50 or above in his debut test.

== Retirement ==
Waller retired from International cricket on 19 March 2019.

== Family ==
Waller's father, Andy, played for Zimbabwe in the 1980s and 1990s. His father also scored 50 in his debut Test albeit in the second innings. His cousin, Nathan Waller also represented Zimbabwe under-19 teams.

== Education ==
Waller attended Lilfordia School. He then moved to the UK to study at Brighton College, where he played in the first XI for three years.
