= 2012–13 Pro50 Championship =

- Dates: 6 October 2012 – 19 January 2013
- Administrator: Zimbabwe Cricket
- Cricket format: List A cricket
- Tournament format: Round-robin + Final
- Champions: Mashonaland Eagles (2nd title)
- Participants: 5
- Matches: 21
- Most runs: Vusi Sibanda (437)
- Most wickets: Christopher Mpofu (14); Glen Querl (14)

The 2012–13 Pro50 Championship was the eleventh edition of the Pro50 Championship, a List A cricket tournament in Zimbabwe. The competition began on 6 October 2012 and the final was played on 19 January 2013.

In the opening round of fixtures, the Mashonaland Eagles had a comfortable victory over the Southern Rocks, while the Mid West Rhinos easily defeated the Matabeleland Tuskers by seven wickets, with the Rhinos openers putting on a partnership of 170 runs in their chase of 211. A second List A century for Vusi Sibanda helped the Rhinos to victory over the Rocks in the second round; he was eventually dismissed for 190. The other game between Mountaineers and the Eagles was postponed following the death of Mashonaland coach Kevin Curran, and the rescheduled match was later abandoned. The third round brought victories for the Rhinos and the Tuskers against the Eagles and Rocks, respectively. The Eagles completed a tense one-wicket win over the Tuskers in round four, while the other game was more one-sided with the Rhinos bowling out the Mountaineers for just 66 runs and then chasing down the target in the 13th over of their reply. In round 5, Graeme Cremer scored an unbeaten 106 and then Glen Querl took his first List A five-for to seal a 132-run win for the Tuskers over the Rhinos. Tino Mawoyo scored his first List A century (an unbeaten 120) and shared and opening stand of 182 with Kevin Kasuza (who scored 85), which made short work of the Mountaineers chase of 267 to beat the Rocks.

The sixth round was affected by rain, with the Tuskers narrowly winning against the Mountaineers by 9 runs on the Duckworth–Lewis method, while the match between the Eagles and the Rocks was abandoned after only 22 overs due to rain. Round seven saw the Eagles cruise to an eight-wicket win over the Mountaineers, with the highlight being an opening stand of 102 between Stuart Matsikenyeri and Sikandar Raza in their chase. Meanwhile the Rhinos thrashed the Rocks by 189 runs, with Vusi Sibanda (106) and Brendan Taylor (134 from 106 deliveries) adding 204 runs for their second wicket. In the eighth round of matches, the Tuskers defeated the Rocks in a match that was reduced to 37 overs per side and the match between the Rhinos and the Eagles was abandoned after less than 10 overs due to rain. In round nine, Sean Ervine top scored with 45 and took three wickets as the Tuskers beat the Eagles to remain top of the table. In the other game, the Mountaineers successfully chased a revised target in a rain-shortened contest against the Rhinos, aided by a century opening stand between Hamilton Masakadza and English batsman Mark Pettini. The final round of the group stage was washed out by rain, with just 11 overs completed in one match and no play at all in the other.

Mashonaland Eagles won the tournament for the second time, defeating the Matabeleland Tuskers by 5 runs in a rain-affected final. Prosper Utseya put in a strong all-round performance, scoring 53 runs batting at number seven to top score for the Eagles before being given out for Obstructing the field and then taking three wickets. Tuskers captain Gavin Ewing scored 94 runs, but his team were just short of the Duckworth–Lewis target when their chase was stopped after 47.5 overs due to rain.

Mid West Rhinos batsman Vusi Sibanda was the tournament's leading run-scorer with a total of 437 runs. Matabeleland Tuskers bowlers Christopher Mpofu and Glen Querl were the joint-leading wicket-tackers with a total of 14 wickets each.

== Points table ==
| Pos | Team | Pld | W | L | T | NR | BP | Ded | Pts | NRR |
|---|---|---|---|---|---|---|---|---|---|---|
| 1 | Matabeleland Tuskers | 8 | 5 | 2 | 0 | 1 | 2 | 0 | 24 | 0.858 |
| 2 | Mashonaland Eagles | 8 | 3 | 2 | 0 | 3 | 1 | 0 | 19 | −0.010 |
| 3 | Mid West Rhinos | 8 | 4 | 2 | 0 | 2 | 3 | 7 | 16 | 1.362 |
| 4 | Mountaineers | 8 | 3 | 3 | 0 | 2 | 0 | 0 | 16 | −0.756 |
| 5 | Southern Rocks | 8 | 0 | 6 | 0 | 2 | 0 | 0 | 4 | −1.655 |

Qualified for the final

== Results ==
=== Round-robin ===
6 October 2012
Scorecard

| Southern Rocks; 151/9 (50 overs) | v | Mashonaland Eagles; 152/5 (36.5 overs) |
| Tendai Chisoro 73* (85); Tatenda Manatsa 2/16 (7 overs) | | Forster Mutizwa 57* (105); Tinashe Panyangara 4/26 (7 overs) |

Mashonaland Eagles won by 5 wickets
Harare Sports Club, Harare
Umpires: Owen Chirombe and Langton Rusere

- Mashonaland Eagles won the toss and elected to field.
- Ben Slater (Southern Rocks) made his List A debut.

6 October 2012
Scorecard

| Matabeleland Tuskers; 211/8 (50 overs) | v | Mountaineers; 212/3 (45.4 overs) |
| Craig Ervine 62 (87); Prosper Utseya 3/46 (10 overs) | | Tino Mawoyo 89 (119); John Nyumbu 2/66 (9.4 overs) |

Mountaineers won by 7 wickets
Queens Sports Club, Bulawayo
Umpires: Trevor Phiri and Jeremiah Matibiri

- Mountaineers won the toss and elected to field.

10 October 2012
Scorecard

| Mid West Rhinos; 330/7 (50 overs) | v | Southern Rocks; 230 (42.1 overs) |
| Vusi Sibanda 190 (157); Brian Vitori 3/49 (10 overs) | | Ben Slater 46 (63); Malcolm Waller 4/29 (7.1 overs) |

Mid West Rhinos won by 100 runs
Masvingo Sports Club, Masvingo
Umpires: Owen Chirombe and Bothwell Mandiya

- Southern Rocks won the toss and elected to field.

13 October 2012
Scorecard

| Mashonaland Eagles; 182 (47.3 overs) | v | Mid West Rhinos; 187/6 (45.5 overs) |
| Chamu Chibhabha 36 (45); Malcolm Waller 3/15 (7 overs) | | Jaik Mickleburgh 73 (110); Tinotenda Mutombodzi 3/27 (10 overs) |

Mid West Rhinos won by 4 wickets
Kwekwe Sports Club, Kwekwe
Umpires: Russell Tiffin and Iknow Chabi

- Mid West Rhinos won the toss and elected to field.

13 October 2012
Scorecard

| Matabeleland Tuskers; 140/9 (31 overs) | v | Southern Rocks; 131/9 (31 overs) |
| Keegan Meth 36 (35); Cuthbert Musoko 4/24 (7 overs) | | Peter Burgoyne 23 (27); Christopher Mpofu 4/19 (6 overs) |

Matabeleland Tuskers won by 9 runs
Masvingo Sports Club, Masvingo
Umpires: Langton Rusere and Bothwell Mandiya

- Southern Rocks won the toss and elected to field.
- Match reduced to 31 overs per side.
- Cuthbert Musoko (Southern Rocks) made his List A debut.

17 October 2012
Scorecard

| Matabeleland Tuskers; 237/8 (50 overs) | v | Mashonaland Eagles; 239/9 (49.2 overs) |
| Sean Ervine 94 (106); Mark Mbofana 3/35 (8 overs) | | Sikandar Raza 63 (73); Keegan Meth 2/29 (10 overs) |

Mashonaland Eagles won by 1 wicket
Harare Sports Club, Harare
Umpires: Russell Tiffin and Langton Rusere

- Mashonaland Eagles won the toss and elected to field.

17 October 2012
Scorecard

| Mountaineers; 66 (26.3 overs) | v | Mid West Rhinos; 68/2 (12.1 overs) |
| Kudzai Sauramba 14 (25); Graeme Cremer 3/22 (6.3 overs) | | Vusi Sibanda 31 (25); Donald Tiripano 1/12 (2.1 overs) |

Mid West Rhinos won by 8 wickets
Kwekwe Sports Club, Kwekwe
Umpires: Iknow Chabi and Jeremiah Matibiri

- Mid West Rhinos won the toss and elected to field.

20 October 2012
Scorecard

| Matabeleland Tuskers; 294/4 (50 overs) | v | Mid West Rhinos; 162 (38 overs) |
| Craig Ervine 106* (102); Malcolm Waller 1/37 (6 overs) | | Jaik Mickleburgh 46* (52); Glen Querl 5/26 (8 overs) |

Matabeleland Tuskers won by 132 runs
Queens Sports Club, Bulawayo
Umpires: Langton Rusere and Christopher Phiri

- Mid West Rhinos won the toss and elected to field.

20 October 2012
Scorecard

| Southern Rocks; 266/8 (50 overs) | v | Mountaineers; 267/3 (47.1 overs) |
| Alester Maregwede 62 (86); Donald Tiripano 2/29 (6 overs) | | Tino Mawoyo 120* (128); Roy Kaia 2/50 (5.1 overs) |

Mountaineers won by 7 wickets
Mutare Sports Club, Mutare
Umpires: Owen Chirombe and Iknow Chabi

- Southern Rocks won the toss and elected to bat.

24 October 2012
Scorecard

| Mountaineers | v | Mashonaland Eagles |

Match abandoned without a ball bowled
Mutare Sports Club, Mutare
Umpires: Sifelani Rwaziyeni and Jeremiah Matibiri

- No toss.

8 December 2012
Scorecard

| Matabeleland Tuskers; 211 (47 overs) | v | Mountaineers; 210 (40.3 overs) |
| Moeen Ali 48 (48); Sean Williams 48 (50); Tendai Chatara 3/34 (9 overs) | | Kudzai Sauramba 40 (40); Christopher Mpofu 4/43 (9 overs) |

Matabeleland Tuskers won by 9 runs (D/L method)
Mutare Sports Club, Mutare
Umpires: Russell Tiffin and Sifelani Rwaziyeni

- Mountaineers won the toss and elected to field.
- Matabeleland Tuskers innings reduced to 47 overs. Mountaineers were set a D/L target of 220 runs from 43 overs.

8 December 2012
Scorecard

| Mashonaland Eagles; 102/2 (21.5 overs) | v | Southern Rocks |
| Regis Chakabva 42* (52); Trevor Garwe 1/20 (4 overs); Cuthbert Musoko 1/20 (5 overs) |

No result
Masvingo Sports Club, Masvingo
Umpires: Owen Chirombe and Bothwell Mandiya

- Southern Rocks won the toss and elected to field.
- Rain ended the match after 21.5 overs.
- Alex Smith (Southern Rocks) made his List A debut.

12 December 2012
Scorecard

| Mountaineers; 179 (50 overs) | v | Mashonaland Eagles; 182/2 (42.1 overs) |
| Shingirai Masakadza 52* (69); Kyle Jarvis 2/37 (10 overs) | | Stuart Matsikenyeri 77* (136); Tendai Chatara 1/36 (8.1 overs) |

Mashonaland Eagles won by 8 wickets
Harare Sports Club, Harare
Umpires: Russell Tiffin and Owen Chirombe

- Mashonaland Eagles won the toss and elected to field.

12 December 2012
Scorecard

| Mid West Rhinos; 302/6 (50 overs) | v | Southern Rocks; 113 (38.2 overs) |
| Brendan Taylor 134 (106); Cuthbert Musoko 3/67 (10 overs) | | Prince Masvaure 40* (73); Mluleki Nkala 5/35 (10 overs) |

Mid West Rhinos won by 189 runs
Kwekwe Sports Club, Kwekwe
Umpires: Sifelani Rwaziyeni and Langton Rusere

- Southern Rocks won the toss and elected to field.

5 January 2013
Scorecard

| Mid West Rhinos; 30/1 (9.3 overs) | v | Mashonaland Eagles |
| Vusi Sibanda 14* (29); Taurai Muzarabani 1/13 (10 overs) |

No result
Harare Sports Club, Harare
Umpires: Russell Tiffin and Owen Chirombe

- Mashonaland Eagles won the toss and elected to field.
- Rain ended the match after just 9.3 overs.

5 January 2013
Scorecard

| Southern Rocks; 131 (36 overs) | v | Matabeleland Tuskers; 136/5 (27.4 overs) |
| Matthew Pardoe 42 (71); Sean Ervine 3/29 (7 overs) | | Brian Chari 54 (66); Tawanda Mupariwa 3/29 (8 overs) |

Matabeleland Tuskers won by 5 wickets
Queens Sports Club, Bulawayo
Umpires: Jeremiah Matibiri and Christopher Phiri

- Matabeleland Tuskers won the toss and elected to field.

9 January 2013
Scorecard

| Mashonaland Eagles; 157 (43.2 overs) | v | Matabeleland Tuskers; 161/3 (32.4 overs) |
| Sikandar Raza 46 (57); Sean Ervine 3/31 (7 overs) | | Sean Ervine 45 (63); Chamu Chibhabha 1/24 (4 overs) |

Matabeleland Tuskers won by 7 wickets
Queens Sports Club, Bulawayo
Umpires: Langton Rusere and Lucky Ngwenya

- Matabeleland Tuskers won the toss and elected to field.

9 January 2013
Scorecard

| Mid West Rhinos; 225/6 (43 overs) | v | Mountaineers; 200/3 (26.2 overs) |
| Jaik Mickleburgh 49 (73); Tapiwa Mufudza 2/51 (9 overs) | | Mark Pettini 85* (73); Neville Madziva 2/32 (5.2 overs) |

Mountaineers won by 7 wickets (D/L method)
Mutare Sports Club, Mutare
Umpires: Russell Tiffin and Sifelani Rwaziyeni

- Mid West Rhinos won the toss and elected to bat.
- Three rain delays reduced the Mid West Rhinos innings to 43 overs. Mountaineers were set a D/L target of 200 runs to win from 28 overs.

12 January 2013
Scorecard

| Matabeleland Tuskers; 53/2 (11.2 overs) | v | Mid West Rhinos |
| Craig Ervine 32* (35); Ed Rainsford 2/9 (4 overs) |

No result
Kwekwe Sports Club, Kwekwe
Umpires: Owen Chirombe and Iknow Chabi

- Matabeleland Tuskers won the toss and elected to bat.
- Rain stopped play after just 11.2 overs.

12 January 2013
Scorecard

| Southern Rocks | v | Mountaineers |

Match abandoned without a ball bowled
Triangle Country Club Ground, Masvingo
Umpires: Jeremiah Matibiri and Bothwell Mandiya

- No toss.
- No play due to rain

=== Final ===
19 January 2013
Scorecard

| Mashonaland Eagles; 222 (49.1 overs) | v | Matabeleland Tuskers; 203/8 (47.5 overs) |
| Prosper Utseya 53 (44); Keegan Meth 3/54 (10 overs) | | Gavin Ewing 94 (123); Prosper Utseya 3/41 (9.5 overs) |

Mashonaland Eagles won by 5 runs (D/L method)
Queens Sports Club, Bulawayo
Umpires: Owen Chirombe and Jeremiah Matibiri

- Matabeleland Tuskers won the toss and elected to field.
- The Matabeleland Tuskers innings was interrupted by rain and the D/L target after 47.5 overs was 209 runs.
- Mashonaland Eagles won the 2012/13 Pro50 Championship
