= Andrew Stone =

Andrew Stone may refer to:

== Sports ==
- Andrew Stone (cricketer) (born 1983), Zimbabwean cricketer
- Andrew Stone (field hockey) (born 1960), American field hockey player
- Andrew Stone (soccer) (born 1990), American soccer player
- Andrew Stone (sailor) (born 1969), New Zealand sailor
- Lex Stone (Andrew Alexis Stone, 1885–1925), head football coach for the University of Tennessee, 1910

== Politicians ==
- Andrew Stone (MP) (1703–1773), British MP for Hastings, 1741–1761
- Andrew Stone, Baron Stone of Blackheath (born 1942), member of the House of Lords

== Others ==
- Andrew Leete Stone (1815–1892), author, Civil War chaplain and pastor
- Andrew Stone (computer programmer) (born 1956), American computer programmer
- Andrew H. Stone (fl. 1980s–2020s), American judge in the State of Utah
- Andrew Stone (Pineapple Dance Studios), dance instructor at Pineapple Dance Studios, Covent Garden, London
- Andrew L. Stone (1902–1999), American screenwriter, director, and producer
- Andy Stone, only permanent member of music group Vince Vance & the Valiants
