= Nyasha =

Nyasha is a Zimbabwean name of Shona origin which refers to grace, mercy, or kind-hearted, and is a unisex name borne by both male and female children. Nyasha can also be a nickname for those bearing names such as Nyashadzashe,] or Nyashadzenyu.

== Notable people with the name ==
- Nyasha Chari (born 1980), Zimbabwean cricketer
- Nyasha Chikwinya, Zimbabwean politician
- Nyasha Gwanzura, Zimbabwean cricketer
- Nyasha Hatendi (born 1981), American-English actor and producer
- Nyasha Junior, American biblical scholar
- Nyasha Matonhodze, Zimbabwean-British fashion model
- Nyasha Mayavo (born 1992), Zimbabwean cricketer
- Nyasha Michelle, Zimbabwean-British television personality
- Nyasha Mushekwi (born 1987), Zimbabwean football player
- Nyasha Mutsauri (born 1991), Zimbabwean beauty pageant titleholder
