= Justin Lewis =

Justin Lewis may refer to:

- Justin Lewis (basketball) (born 2002), American basketball player
- Justin Lewis (cricketer) (born 1982), Zimbabwean cricketer
- Justin Lewis (media scholar), British media studies professor
- Justin Lewis (entrepreneur), software designer and entrepreneur
- Justin W. Lewis (born 1982), American conductor, cellist and educator
