= Greg Lamb =

Zimbabwean cricketer (born 1981)

Personal information
- Full name: Gregory Arthur Lamb
- Born: 4 March 1981 (age 45); Salisbury, Zimbabwe
- Nickname: Gumbos, Lamby
- Height: 6 ft 0 in (1.83 m)
- Batting: Right-handed
- Bowling: Right-arm off break Right-arm medium

International information
- National side: Zimbabwe
- Only Test (cap 79): 1 September 2011 v Pakistan
- ODI debut (cap 107): 4 March 2010 v West Indies
- Last ODI: 6 March 2010 v West Indies
- ODI shirt no.: 19
- T20I debut (cap 21): 28 February 2010 v West Indies
- Last T20I: 13 June 2010 v India
- T20I shirt no.: 19

Domestic team information
- Years: Team
- 1999/00: CFX Academy
- 2000/01: Mashonaland A
- 2004–2008: Hampshire (squad no. 29)
- 2009: Wiltshire
- 2009/10–2014/15: Mashonaland Eagles (squad no. 12)
- 2012/13: Mountaineers

Career statistics
Competition	Test	ODI	FC	LA
Matches	1	15	70	98
Runs scored	46	197	3,316	1,778
Batting average	23.00	17.90	33.49	26.53
100s/50s	–/–	–/–	7/14	1/9
Top score	39	37	171	100*
Balls bowled	192	642	5,590	2,441
Wickets	3	12	80	54
Bowling average	47.00	38.91	38.92	35.83
5 wickets in innings	–	–	1	–
10 wickets in match	–	–	–	–
Best bowling	3/120	3/45	7/73	4/38
Catches/stumpings	2/–	–/–	53/0	35/–
- Source: Cricinfo, 4 March 2026

Gregory Arthur Lamb (born 4 March 1981) is a Zimbabwean former cricketer who played international cricket for Zimbabwe and domestic cricket in England and Zimbabwe. Lamb began his career playing in the Logan Cup for the CFX Academy and Mashonaland A, before moving to England to play county cricket for Hampshire. He played for Hampshire between 2004 and 2008, and after he was released by the county, he played minor counties cricket for Wiltshire in 2009. He returned to Zimbabwe to play for the Mashonaland Eagles in the 2009–10 season, where his good form earned him selection to the Zimbabwe One Day International (ODI) and Twenty20 International (T20I) squads. Lamb would subsequently represent them in the 2010 World Twenty20 and the Cricket World Cup, before playing a single Test match in 2011 against Pakistan. He played his last international match in 2011, with his domestic career continuing until his retirement at the end of the 2012–13 season, that had seen him switch to play for the Mountaineers; he later returned to domestic cricket with the Mashonaland Eagles in the 2014–15 season, but retired again following its conclusion. After the end of his professional career, he spent two periods as batting coach of the Zimbabwe Under-19 team.

During his career, he made 70 first-class, 98 one-day and 63 Twenty20 (T20) appearances as an all-rounder, scoring over 5,000 runs across all formats and taking over 160 wickets. In his international career, he made 15 ODI and five T20I appearances, scoring 197 runs and taking 12 wickets in the former.

== Early life and education ==
Gregory Arthur Lamb was born on 4 March 1981 in Salisbury, Zimbabwe. He was raised on a tobacco farm in the Karoi District of Mashonaland, with his parents farm being adjacent to that of the cricketer Robin Brown, whose son he befriended. He was educated at Karoi Rydings school, where he first played cricket aged 8, and later earned national selection at primary level. He began playing as a wicket-keeper, but became "bored" in that role, and so developed his medium pace bowling. From there, he advanced to Lomagundi College. He played little cricket in his first three years at the college, but in his final year he scored three-successive centuries at the Prince Edward School cricket festival. In addition to playing cricket for the college, Lamb also played field hockey, tennis, and squash.

== Cricket ==
=== Early career ===
With an option to continue his education for a further year or join the Zimbabwe Cricket Academy, Lamb decided upon the latter. Playing for the Karoi District cricket team in 1998, he scored one century and six half-centuries. He played for Zimbabwe Under-19s in the 1998 Under-19 Cricket World Cup, making two appearances. He moved to Harare in 1999, and aided by his friendship with Dirk Viljoen, he joined the Old Hararians. Lamb made his debut in first-class cricket in January 1999 for the Zimbabwe Cricket Union President's XI against the touring England A team at Kwekwe; he made his debut in one-day cricket against the same opponents a week before. In March, he played a second first-class match for the Zimbabwe Cricket Academy against a touring Australian Cricket Academy team, scoring 67 runs from 67 balls in the academy's second innings. He spent the summer in England, playing club cricket for Brook in Surrey.

The following season, he made two first-class appearances for the President's XI against the touring Australians and Sri Lankans, and played a second match against the Sri Lankans for the academy. In January 2000, he played in seven matches in the Under-19 World Cup. After a modest start to the tournament, he finished with 63 runs against South Africa Under-19. He played for the CFX Academy in the 1999–2000 Logan Cup, making four appearances. Lamb was their leading wicket-taker in the competition, taking 16 wickets with his off spin at an average of 14.18; he claimed the only five-wicket haul of his career against Midlands, taking 7 for 73. He also scored his maiden first-class century, an unbeaten 100 runs against Manicaland. Lamb played for Zimbabwe A in the 2000 Emerging Nations Tournament, played against Associate members of the International Cricket Council. He made four appearances in the competition, scoring 121 runs, with his highest score being an unbeaten 72 runs against the Netherlands.

Lamb was chosen for Zimbabwe A's tour of Sri Lanka in April–May 2000, playing three first-class and four one-day matches. He returned to England during the Zimbabwean winter, where he spent a second season playing club cricket in England, this time for Walton-on-Thames. After playing a first-class match for Zimbabwe A against the touring New Zealanders in September 2000, he played four matches for Mashonaland A in the 2000–01 Logan Cup. In 2001, he played club cricket in England for Cheam, but suffered a shoulder dislocation that required surgery and kept him out of the 2001–02 Zimbabwean season. Prior to his injury, he had played Second XI cricket for Gloucestershire, Hampshire, and Kent. Alongside playing club cricket in Surrey, Lamb studied business studies and human biology at Guildford College. He was a member of the Midlands B squad for the B Division of the 2002–03 Logan Cup, having returned to Zimbabwe after spending two continuous years in England.

=== Move to England ===
Having impressed for Hampshire in the Second XI Championship in 2003, Lamb was offered a contract with the county ahead of the 2004 season. Since 1999, he had spent five winters in England; as a result, by the start of the 2004 season, he had completed his five-year residential qualification to play county cricket. He made his senior Hampshire debut in a one-day match against Lancashire at Southampton in the 2004 totesport League, with Lamb making five further appearances in the competition; he scored 129 runs at an average of 21.50, making one fifty against Northamptonshire. He made his Twenty20 (T20) debut during the 2004 season, making six appearances in the Twenty20 Cup. He made his County Championship debut in Hampshire's final Championship match of the season against Derbyshire, top-scoring in their first innings of 396 all out with 94 runs. He played regularly for the county in the 2005 season, making nine appearances in the County Championship, in which Hampshire finished as runners-up. He scored 250 runs at an average of 16.66 in the Championship, making two half-centuries. In one-day cricket, he made 16 appearances, playing in Hampshire's 18 runs victory against Warwickshire in the final of the Cheltenham & Gloucester Trophy at Lord's. In his 16 appearances, he scored 296 runs at an average of 24.66, scoring an unbeaten century opening the batting in a defeat against Northamptonshire in the totesport League. In the Twenty20 Cup, he scored 151 runs at an average of 25.16, making one half century (67 runs from 54 balls) against Essex.

Lamb struggled to hold down a place in the 2006 County Championship, playing twice, being preferred in limited-overs cricket. He played seven matches in the Cheltenham & Gloucester Trophy and five in the Pro 40, scoring 231 runs from 13 one-day appearances, with two half centuries. He also took 11 wickets at an average of 20.27, taking career-best one-day figures of 4 for 38 against Yorkshire, a match in which he also scored 64 runs. Lamb topped Hampshire's batting averages in the Twenty20 Cup, with 183 runs at an average of 36.60 from eight matches. After uncertainty about his future at Hampshire, Lamb was retained ahead of the 2007 season. He found himself out of the first eleven in 2007, making two one-day and seven T20 appearances. A broken thumb sustained in a Second XI match in August ruled him out of appearing in the final of the Friends Provident Trophy, after good bowling form for the Second XI had put him in contention for a recall in the final. He featured more regularly the following season, beginning the season as Hampshire's main spinner following the departures of Shaun Udal and Shane Warne. He made nine appearances in the County Championship, scoring 272 runs at an average of 20.92. In ten one-day matches, he scored 128 runs — 84 of which came against Worcestershire in the Friends Provident Trophy. He also made ten appearances in the Twenty20 Cup, taking 8 wickets at an average of 33.12. Lamb was released at the end of the 2008 season, having been displaced as Hampshire's first-choice spinner by Liam Dawson and Imran Tahir.

Lamb returned to club cricket, playing for Burridge in the Southern Premier Cricket League. Lamb joined Wiltshire in minor counties cricket prior to the 2009 season. He made six appearances in the Minor Counties Championship and four in the MCCA Knockout Trophy. He had success in the MCCA Knockout Trophy scoring 259 runs at an average of 129.50, and in the Minor Counties Championship he made one century.

=== Return to Zimbabwe ===
With the launch of a domestic franchise system in Zimbabwe ahead of the 2009–10 season, Lamb returned there to play for Mashonaland Eagles. He was prolific in his first season back in Zimbabwean domestic cricket, passing a thousand runs first-class in a season for the only time in his career, with 1,050 at an average of 61.76 from 12 matches in the Logan Cup. He scored three centuries, making 106 runs against the Southern Rocks, and 171 runs against Mid West Rhinos. His third, a score of 159 runs, came in the competitions drawn final against Mid West Rhinos, with Lamb also sharing in a partnership of 211 runs for the fifth wicket with Elton Chigumbura; the Eagles won the competition having topped the round-robin league stage. His form continued to the One-Day Competition, with Lamb scoring 261 runs at an average of 52.20. His good form was rewarded at the end of the season, when he was chosen in Zimbabwe's fifteen-man squad for their limited-overs tour of the West Indies in February–March 2010.

Lamb made his debut for Zimbabwe on the tour in a Twenty20 International (T20I) match against the West Indies that preceded the ODIs. In the T20I, Lamb bowled economically, taking 2 for 14 from four overs. His One Day International (ODI) debut followed in the opening match of the series, with Lamb featuring in all five ODIs. In March, he was named in Zimbabwe's squad for the World Twenty20 in the West Indies in May, playing in both their group stage defeats to New Zealand and Sri Lanka. The following month, he played in the home ODI tri-series against India and Sri Lanka, playing in four of Zimbabwe's five matches in the series, including the final against Sri Lanka. He then played in both T20I's against India that followed the ODI series. In the 2010-11 Logan Cup, he made four appearances and scored 211 runs at an average of 35.16, making one century (101 runs) against Matabeleland Tuskers. In four one-day matches in the Metbank Pro40 Championship, he scored 121 runs with a top-score of 96 from 78 balls against Southern Rocks. The Eagles reached the final of the Stanbic Bank 20, which they won by a single run. Lamb made six appearances in the competition, taking 6 wickets at an average of 21.83.

In January 2011, Lamb was named in Zimbabwe's fifteen-man squad for the 50-over World Cup in the West Indies. He played in five of their ten matches, though scored only 62 runs at an average of 15.50 and took 4 wickets at an average of 40.75. Having impressed in a two-day warm-up match between a Zimbabwe XI and the touring Pakistanis at the end of August, he played in the only Test match between Zimbabwe and Pakistan at Bulawayo at the beginning of September, scoring 39 runs in Zimbabwe's first innings and taking 3 for 120 in Pakistan's first innings. He subsequently played in the first ODI of the three-match series that followed the Test. Having missed the 2011–12 season, Lamb joined the Mountaineers ahead of the 2012–13 season. In that seasons Logan Cup, he scored 476 runs at an average of 36.61 from eight matches, making two centuries, and took 10 wickets at an average of 25.90. In limited-overs cricket, he made six appearances in the Pro50 Championship, and played seven times in the Stanbic Bank 20, making one T20 half century. He retired at the end of the season, citing low wages and limited game time, opting to work on his parents farm.

Lamb returned to professional cricket in October 2014, feeling that wages for cricketers in the country had improved. He made himself available for Zimbabwe's tour of Bangladesh, but was not selected. He returned to play for Mashonaland Eagles in the 2014–15 season, scoring 358 runs at an average of 39.77 from seven matches in the Logan Cup, alongside taking 15 wickets at an average of 28.40. In the Eagles victorious Pro50 Championship campaign, he scored 182 runs at an average of 36.40 from eight matches. He retired for the final time after the season.

=== Post-retirement ===
Lamb was appointed batting coach of Zimbabwe Under-19 in 2015, alongside bowling coach Prosper Utseya and head-coach Stephen Mangongo. He accompanied the under-19s to the 2016 Under-19 Cricket World Cup. His contract was terminated in April 2018, which saw several staff across both age-group and the national teams sacked following Zimbabwe's failure to qualify for the 2019 World Cup. He played club cricket in Ireland in 2019, playing for The Hills in the Leinster Senior League. He rejoined the coaching staff of the Zimbabwe Under-19 team in December, being appointed their batting coach ahead of their participation in the 2020 Under-19 Cricket World Cup. He played club cricket for Minster in the Kent Cricket League between 2021 and 2025, and was the club's director of youth cricket.

=== Playing style and statistics ===
An all-rounder, Lamb began his career as a right-arm medium paced bowler, but by 1998 had become an off spinner. David Houghton rated him as the best spinner in Zimbabwe during the formative years of his career, remaking on his loop and ability to generate spin on the ball. He was a right-handed middle order batsman, preferring to bat at number four, though on occasion he opened in limited-overs matches. In the early part of his career, he was prone to getting out when cutting the ball, but later refined his technique to play shots off the front foot. Batting was the aspect of his all-round game that he was best known for.

Lamb made 15 ODI appearances. In these, he scored 197 runs at an average of 17.90, with a highest score of 37 runs. He took 12 ODI wickets at an average of 38.91. In T20I cricket, he made five appearances, scoring 32 runs and taking 4 wickets at an average of exactly 20. In first-class cricket, Lamb made 70 appearances, scoring 3,316 runs at an average of 33.49, making seven centuries and 14 half-centuries. With the ball, he took 80 wickets at an average of 38.92. He scored 1,778 runs at an average of 26.53 from 98 appearances in one-day cricket, making nine half-centuries alongside one century, and took 54 wickets at an average of 35.83. He made 63 appearances in T20 cricket, scoring 762 runs at an average of 17.31, with three half centuries. He also took 32 wickets at an average of 28.90. Lamb favoured fielding at point or in the covers. Across all formats, he held 102 catches.

== Works cited ==
- Lynch, Stephen (2011). The Wisden Guide to International Cricket 2012. London: Bloomsbury Publishing. ISBN 978-1-4081-6530-0.
