= List of Haverford School people =

This list includes notable alumni and faculty of the Haverford School, a private school in Haverford, Pennsylvania.

== Notable alumni ==
=== Academia ===
- Robert Clarkson Clothier, 1903 – president of Rutgers University (1932–1951); president of the New Jersey Constitutional Convention (1947)
- John J. DiIulio Jr., 1976 – political science professor at the University of Pennsylvania; first director of the White House Office of Faith-Based and Community Initiatives initiated by President George W. Bush
- John Powers Middleton – television and film producer
- H. Richard Winn – neurosurgeon; professor of neurosurgery and neuroscience at Mount Sinai School of Medicine

=== Art and architecture ===
- Robert M. Ayres – architect active in San Antonio; son of Atlee Ayres
- Chuck Brodsky – folk artist
- Walter Mellor – architect
- Maxfield Parrish, 1888 – painter and illustrator

=== Business ===
- Douglas Brunt – president and CEO of the cybersecurity firm Authentium, married to Megyn Kelly
- Michael Dubin, 1997 – founder and CEO of Dollar Shave Club
- John Middleton – former owner of John Middleton Co., part owner of the Philadelphia Phillies
- Jeffrey E. Perelman – billionaire; CEO of JEP Management company
- Ronald Perelman, 1960 – billionaire; controlling owner of MacAndrews & Forbes
- Frank S. Welsh, 1958 – president of Welsh Color and Conservation, Inc.

=== Entertainment ===
- Lyle Bettger – actor
- James Lavino, 1991 – composer
- Justin W. Lewis – conductor, cellist, and educator
- Eric Thal, 1983 – stage and film actor
- Bradley Whitford – actor; attended but did not graduate

=== Law ===
- Henry Drinker – attorney

=== Literature and journalism ===
- Jennifer Finney Boylan – author, transgender activist, and president of PEN America
- Alec Brownstein – humorist and author
- Al Hunt, 1960 – journalist and managing editor of Bloomberg News
- Arthur Crew Inman – diarist and poet
- Peter Morris, 1991 – playwright; author of Guardians

=== Military ===
- Maj. Gen. Smedley Darlington Butler, 1898 – two-time Medal of Honor recipient; major general in the US Marine Corps; nicknamed "The Fighting Quaker"
- James Rogers McConnell, 1908 – World War I military aviator; a founding member of the Lafayette Escadrille

=== Politics ===
- Robert Clarkson Clothier, 1903 – president of the New Jersey Constitutional Convention (1947), 14th president of Rutgers University
- Ben T. Elliott – speechwriter for President Ronald Reagan
- Douglas Hemphill Elliott – United States House of Representatives
- Oscar Goodman, 1957 – mayor of Las Vegas, Nevada
- John Hickenlooper, 1970 – United States Senate, governor of Colorado, mayor of Denver, and 2020 Democratic Party presidential candidate
- Thacher Longstreth, 1937 – Philadelphia City Council

=== Science ===
- Pete Conrad – astronaut, third man to walk on the Moon
- John du Pont – ornithologist, founder and director of the Delaware Museum of Natural History, and convicted murderer
- Richard W. Thorington Jr. – zoologist; curator of mammals at the Smithsonian Institution

=== Sports ===
- Shizz Alston, 2015 – collegiate basketball player for Temple and professional basketball player
- Will Barker – former offensive tackle for the Dallas Cowboys
- Bert Bell, 1914 – NFL commissioner and founder of the Philadelphia Eagles
- Ben Bentil (born 1995) – Ghanaian basketball player for Hapoel Tel Aviv of the Israeli Basketball Premier League
- Britton Chance, 1931 – Olympic gold medalist in sailing; University of Pennsylvania professor
- William Clothier, 1889 – tennis player
- Ernest Cozens, 1907 – football player, president of the Eastern Intercollegiate Boxing Association
- Bob Folwell – football player and coach
- Bill Fritz – pole vaulter
- Mike Mayock, 1976 – former NFL player and NFL analyst, former general manager of the Oakland Raiders
- Jameer Nelson Jr., 2019 – NBA point guard for the Philadelphia 76ers
- Asim Richards, 2019 – NFL offensive guard for the Dallas Cowboys
- Steve Sabol, 1960 – president of NFL Films
- Henry Sayen – cricketer
- Dave Stilley – lacrosse player in Major League Lacrosse
- Jeremiah White, 2000 – professional soccer player
- Dan Wigrizer - former college lacrosse player

== Notable faculty ==
- Harold Boatrite – composer; former music teacher
- W. D. Ehrhart – poet, writer, scholar, Vietnam veteran; "the dean of Vietnam war poetry;" member of Vietnam Veterans Against the War; 1993 Pew Fellow in the Arts
- Joe Iacone – football coach
- Doug Knight – lacrosse coach and math teacher
- John Nagl – former headmaster of the school
- Walter Ferris Price – architect; school founder who taught classics
