= CFX Academy cricket team =

Cricket team in Zimbabwe

CFX Academy
Team information
- Established: 1999 (First-class)
- Last match: 2002
- Home venue: Kwekwe Sports Club

The CFX Academy cricket team was a first-class cricket team representing the Zimbabwe's cricket academy in the country's domestic cricket competitions. They competed in the Logan Cup from 1999 until 2002. The club played their home matches at the Country Club, Harare.

== First-class record ==
Season	Position	Leading run-scorer	Runs	Leading wicket-taker	Wickets
1999–2000	3rd	Alester Maregwede	246	Greg Lamb	16
2000–01	6th	Barney Rogers	394	Ian Coulson	9
2001–02	4th	Andre Hoffman	384	Jordane Nicolle	18

== Players ==
The following players represented the team:

- Glen Barrett
- Thomas Benade
- Gary Brent
- Conan Brewer
- Ryan Butterworth
- Nyasha Chari
- Innocent Chinyoka
- Neetan Chouhan
- Ian Coulson
- Charles Coventry
- Guy Croxford
- Keith Dabengwa
- Colin Delport
- Terry Duffin
- Dion Ebrahim
- Sean Ervine
- Neil Ferreira
- Travis Friend
- Glenn Goosen
- Gregg Haakonsen
- Andre Hoffman
- Douglas Hondo
- Ryan King
- Greg Lamb
- Justin Lewis
- Campbell Macmillan
- Clement Mahachi
- Blessing Mahwire
- Alester Maregwede
- Doug Marillier
- Stuart Matsikenyeri
- Allan Mwayenga
- Andre Neethling
- Jordane Nicolle
- Mluleki Nkala
- Ray Price
- Pete Rinke
- Barney Rogers
- Arnold Rushambwa
- Sherezad Shah
- Vusimuzi Sibanda
- Richard Sims
- Wisdom Siziba
- Leon Soma
- Andrew Stone
- Paul Strang
- Alec Taylor
- Matthew Townshend
- John Vaughan-Davies
- Mark Vermeulen
- Dirk Viljoen
- Kingsley Went
- Jason Young
