= Zimbabwean cricket team in Bangladesh in 2010–11 =

| | Bangladesh | Zimbabwe |
- Dates: 1 December 2010 – 12 December 2010
| Captains | Shakib Al Hasan | Elton Chigumbura |

One Day International series
- Results: Bangladesh won the 5-match series 3–1
| Most runs | Tamim Iqbal (162) | Craig Ervine (134) |
| Most wickets | Abdur Razzak (13) | Ray Price (6); Christopher Mpofu (6) |
- Player of the series: Abdur Razzak (Ban)

The Zimbabwe national cricket team toured Bangladesh, playing 5 ODI matches from 1 to 12 December 2010.

== Squads ==
ODI squads
| Bangladesh | Zimbabwe |
|---|---|
| Shakib Al Hasan (c) | Elton Chigumbura (c) |
| Abdur Razzak | Ryan Butterworth |
| Imrul Kayes | Regis Chakabva |
| Junaid Siddique | Chamu Chibhabha |
| Mahmudullah | Graeme Cremer |
| Mashrafe Mortaza | Keith Dabengwa |
| Mohammad Ashraful | Craig Ervine |
| Mushfiqur Rahim (wk) | Hamilton Masakadza |
| Naeem Islam | Shingirai Masakadza |
| Nazmul Hossain | Keegan Meth |
| Raqibul Hasan | Christopher Mpofu |
| Rubel Hossain | Ray Price |
| Shafiul Islam | Tatenda Taibu |
| Suhrawadi Shuvo | Brendan Taylor |
| Tamim Iqbal | Prosper Utseya |

== ODI series ==
=== Tour match ===
29 November 2010
Scorecard

| BCB XI (Bangladesh); 223/9 (50 overs) | v | Zimbabweans; 194 (46.1 overs) |
| Saghir Hossain 49 (84); Keegan Meth 4/46 (8 overs) | | Tatenda Taibu 32 (48); Noor Hossain 3/40 (8 overs) |

BCB XI won by 29 runs
Bangladesh Krira Shikkha Protisthan No 2 Ground, Savar, Dhaka
Umpires: Masudur Rahman (Ban) and Sharfuddoula (Ban)

- Bangladesh Cricket Board XI won the toss and elected to bat.

=== 1st ODI ===
1 December 2010
Scorecard

| Zimbabwe; 209 (49 overs) | v | Bangladesh; 200 (49 overs) |
| Regis Chakabva 45 (85); Abdur Razzak 4/41 (10 overs) | | Shakib Al Hasan 63 (65); Christopher Mpofu 3/25 (9 overs) |

Zimbabwe won by 9 runs
Sher-e-Bangla Cricket Stadium, Mirpur, Dhaka
Umpires: Asoka de Silva (SL) and Enamul Haque (Ban)
Player of the match: Christopher Mpofu (Zim)

- bangladesh won the toss and decided to bat .

=== 2nd ODI ===
3 December 2010
Scorecard

| Zimbabwe; 191 (46.2 overs) | v | Bangladesh; 194/4 (39.4 overs) |
| Craig Ervine 42* (41); Abdur Razzak 5/30 (9.2 overs) | | Raqibul Hasan 65 (79); Ray Price 2/41 (9 overs) |

Bangladesh won by 6 wickets
Sher-e-Bangla Cricket Stadium, Mirpur, Dhaka
Umpires: Asoka de Silva (SL) and Enamul Haque (Ban)
Player of the match: Abdur Razzak (Ban)

- Bangladesh won the toss and elected to field.

=== 3rd ODI ===
6 December 2010
Scorecard

| Bangladesh; 246/7 (50 overs) | v | Zimbabwe; 181 (48.1 overs) |
| Shakib Al Hasan 73 (91); Prosper Utseya 4/38 (10 overs) | | Prosper Utseya 67 (101); Abdur Razzak 4/14 (10 overs) |

Bangladesh won by 65 runs
Sher-e-Bangla Cricket Stadium, Mirpur, Dhaka
Umpires: Asoka de Silva (SL) and Sharfuddoula (Ban)
Player of the match: Abdur Razzak (Ban)

- Zimbabwe won the toss and elected to field.

=== 4th ODI ===
10 December 2010
Scorecard

| Zimbabwe | v | Bangladesh |

Match abandoned without a ball bowled
Zohur Ahmed Chowdhury Stadium, Chittagong
Umpires: Asoka de Silva (SL) and Nadir Shah (Ban)

=== 5th ODI ===
12 December 2010
Scorecard

| Zimbabwe; 188/6 (50 overs) | v | Bangladesh; 189/4 (43 overs) |
| Tatenda Taibu 64 (104); Shakib Al Hasan 3/58 (10 overs) | | Tamim Iqbal 95 (96); Keith Dabengwa 1/23 (4 overs) |

Bangladesh won by 6 wickets
Zohur Ahmed Chowdhury Stadium, Chittagong
Umpires: Asoka de Silva (SL) and Nadir Shah (Ban)
Player of the match: Tamim Iqbal (Ban)

- Zimbabwe won the toss and elected to bat.
