= Thomas Benade =

Zimbabwean cricketer (born 1982)

Personal information
- Born: 1 September 1982 (age 44); Harare, Zimbabwe
- Source: ESPNcricinfo, 6 December 2016

Thomas Benade (born 1 September 1982) is a Zimbabwean former cricketer. He played six first-class matches between 2001 and 2004.

== Biography ==
Benade was born in a family that originates from South Africa with Dutch roots. He was introduced to cricket by his father and uncles.

Growing up in Mutorashanga, northern Mashonaland, Benade began his cricket journey at Barwick School in Mvurwi and later Bryden Country School near Chegutu. His performances earned him a spot in the school's first team for two years, his best being four for 30 as a left-arm spinner, and 69 not out as a batsman. He also represented Midlands in the national primary schools cricket week.

For high school, Benade moved to Lomagundi College where he started bowling seamers due to the team's requirement, but he continued his spin bowling which he considers his primary strength. His best performances included taking five for 40 against St. John's College and scoring 79 not out against Prince Edward School. His improved skills led to his selection for the Mashonaland Under-16 team, and eventually the national Under-19 team in 2001.

Benade's application for the academy in 2002 was initially missed due to an administrative error, but he was offered a place when Masakadza withdrew. At that time, he was working for his father in mining and considering going overseas. He had also played winter cricket for the Maribou Club at Mutoroshanga and a few matches for Harare Sports Club. His best performances include scoring 79 not out and taking five wickets in an innings.

Benade credits Rory Ervine and Academy coach Dave Houghton for helping improve his batting and bowling.

== See also ==
- CFX Academy cricket team
