= Alec Taylor (cricketer) =

Zimbabwean cricketer (born 1975)

Personal information
- Born: 6 November 1975 (age 51); Bulawayo, Zimbabwe
- Source: ESPNcricinfo, 8 December 2016

Alec Taylor (born 6 November 1975) is a Zimbabwean cricketer. He played nine first-class matches between 1999 and 2003.

== Biography ==
Alec Taylor was born in Zimbabwe's Eastern Highlands. After early exposure to cricket through familial and neighborly influences, Taylor started structured training at Hillcrest Junior School and Hillcrest College. Despite his efforts, he didn't make the Manicaland national primary school team.

To access sports facilities, Taylor transferred to Plumtree School near Bulawayo, where he made to the Matabeleland School's squad and played representative hockey. Post-school, he apprenticed with Farmec in Harare, limiting his cricket to social games. On completing his apprenticeship in the 1996–97 season, he resumed serious cricket, playing for Manicaland and receiving guidance from its captain, Mark Burmester.

His club cricket career spanned Harare Sports Club and Old Hararians. A notable performance against the Western Province team led him to the Academy. Alongside cricket, Taylor managed a generator-specialist company.

His cricketing strength centred on his bowling pace, ball control, and aggressive batting style. However, a stress fracture hampered his progress. He had a stint with Bangor, Northern Ireland in 2000.

== See also ==
- CFX Academy cricket team
