= Glenn Goosen =

Zimbabwean cricketer (born 1982)

Personal information
- Full name: Glenn Charles Goosen
- Born: 29 April 1982 (age 44); Harare, Zimbabwe
- Batting: Left-handed
- Bowling: Right-arm off break
- Role: Wicket-keeper

Domestic team information
- Years: Team
- 2002/03: Mashonaland
- 2001/02: CFX Academy

Career statistics
Competition	First-class
Matches	5
Runs scored	256
Batting average	28.44
100s/50s	1/1
Top score	101*
Balls bowled	–
Wickets	–
Bowling average	–
5 wickets in innings	–
10 wickets in match	–
Best bowling	–
Catches/stumpings	13/3
- Source: Cricinfo, 21 September 2012

Glenn Goosen (born 29 April 1982) is a former Zimbabwean cricketer. He was a left-handed batsman and a right-arm off-break bowler and wicket-keeper. He was born in Harare.

Goosen made four appearances for CFX Academy in the Logan Cup competition of 2001/02, batting in the upper-middle order. He recovered from his poor form in the first innings of the match to score a powerful 35 in the second innings, alongside opener Neetan Chouhan.

Goosen scored a half century in the second match against Mashonaland A, though their opponents powered their way to victory mostly courtesy of an innings of 180 from Mark Vermeulen. He followed this up with an unbeaten century in the next game.

Despite his form in the 2001/02 competition, he played just a single game in the following season's competition, having moved to Mashonaland. Goosen scored a duck in the first of only two innings he played for the team, though he took three catches from behind the wicket.
