= John Vaughan-Davies =

Zimbabwean cricketer (born 1980)

Personal information
- Born: 22 December 1980 (age 45); Harare, Zimbabwe
- Source: ESPNcricinfo, 8 December 2016

John Vaughan-Davies (born 22 December 1980) is a Zimbabwean former cricketer. He played thirteen first-class matches between 1999 and 2002.

== Biography ==
Vaughan-Davies started playing cricket in Grade 3 at Ruzawi junior school, he advanced to represent Mashonaland Country Districts at each age group during high school at Lomagundi College. There, he captained an unbeaten school team for two years. At 15, he joined Ayrshire in the Mashonaland winter cricket league, developing his skills as both a bowler and batsman. After school, he joined the CFX Academy, making his first-class debut with a half-century against Manicaland.

== See also ==
- CFX Academy cricket team
