= Neethling =

Neethling is a surname. Notable people with the surname include:

- Andre Neethling (born 1979), Zimbabwean cricketer
- Anna Neethling-Pohl (1906–1992), South African actress, performer and film producer
- Candice Neethling (born 1992), South African cross-country mountain biker
- Coetie Neethling (1932–2015), South African cricketer
- Johannes Neethling (1770–1838), South African judge
- Lothar Neethling (1935–2005), South African police officer
- Ryk Neethling (born 1977), South African businessman

See also:

- Neethling virus: the cause of lumpy skin disease
