= Colin Delport =

Zimbabwean cricketer (born 1978)

Personal information
- Born: 4 August 1978 (age 48); Kadoma, Zimbabwe
- Source: ESPNcricinfo, 7 December 2016

Colin Delport (born 4 August 1978) is a Zimbabwean former cricketer. He played fifteen first-class matches between 1999 and 2004.

== Biography ==
Delport, originally from Kadoma and Chegutu in Zimbabwe, was introduced to cricket by his father, who had previously played for the Rhodesian Schools team. He attended Lomagundi College where he began playing cricket at six, primarily as a batsman and fielder, eventually securing a spot in the school's Colts team in Grade 3 and the first team from Grade 5.

By accident, Delport turned to wicket-keeping at 13, enjoyed it, and showed proficiency in the role. Throughout high school, he represented Mashonaland Country Districts as a wicket-keeper at the Under-19 level, and posted a personal high score of 91. He also played rugby and hockey, but his primary focus was cricket.

His cricket career advanced during the 1997 Zimbabwe Under-19 tour of England, where he scored 50 runs in an unofficial Test match at Northampton and showed impressive wicket-keeping skills. He spent two seasons playing for Poulton in England while also maintaining the club grounds.

Upon his return to Zimbabwe, Delport joined the Zimbabwe Cricket Academy with a three-year contract, including two years coaching in the provinces. He resumed playing for Old Hararians, contributing notable performances. His stay at the Academy led to an arrangement with Midlands, which helped him further develop his cricket skills.

Delport played winter league cricket for Chegutu in 2001, achieving a personal high score of 160 against Norton. He also played a Zimbabwe A game against West Indies. Colin was later selected for the Zimbabwe Board XI squad, a significant progression in his career, despite not making the final 15. His contract ended in 2002.

== See also ==
- CFX Academy cricket team
