= Mahachi =

Mahachi is a Zimbabwean surname. Notable people with the surname include:

- Clement Mahachi, Zimbabwean cricketer
- Kudakwashe Mahachi, Zimbabwean footballer
- Moven Mahachi, Minister of Defence of Zimbabwe
