= Ryan King =

Ryan King may refer to:

- Ryan King (Canadian football)
- Ryan King (cricketer)
- Ryan King (rugby league), Italy international rugby league footballer
