= Ryan Ervine =

Zimbabwean cricketer

Personal information
- Born: 19 July 1988 (age 38); Chinhoyi, Zimbabwe
- Batting: Right-handed
- Bowling: Right-arm fast-medium
- Relatives: Craig Ervine (brother); Sean Ervine (brother); Gordon Den (uncle)

Domestic team information
- Years: Team
- 2009-2010: Southern Rocks
- List A debut: 19 October 2009 Rocks v Rhinos
- Last List A: 27 October 2009 Rocks v Tuskers
- T20 debut: 13 February 2010 Rocks v Vipers
- Last T20: 17 February 2010 Rocks v Rhinos

Career statistics
Competition	List A	Twenty20
Matches	2	3
Runs scored	5	21
Batting average	2.50	21.00
100s/50s	-/-	-/-
Top score	4	21
Balls bowled	96	6
Wickets	1	0
Bowling average	83.00	-
5 wickets in innings	-	-
10 wickets in match	-	-
Best bowling	1/51	0/16
Catches/stumpings	0/-	0/-
- Source: Cricinfo, 23 November 2022

Ryan Ervine (born 19 July 1988) is a Zimbabwean cricketer who played two List A matches and three Twenty20 matches for Southern Rocks in the 2009/10 season.

He is the brother of current Zimbabwe international Craig Ervine and former Zimbabwe international Sean Ervine. Ervine's uncle Neil and father Rory both played first-class cricket for Rhodesia B in the 1977/78 Castle Bowl competition and another uncle, Gordon Den, played for Rhodesia and Eastern province in the 1960s. Den's father, Ervine's grandfather, Alexander Den is recorded as having made one appearance for Rhodesia against the touring Australian national side in 1936.
