= Andrew Stone (cricketer) =

Zimbabwean cricketer (born 1983)

Personal information
- Born: 6 January 1983 (age 43); Harare, Zimbabwe
- Source: ESPNcricinfo, 8 December 2016

Andrew Stone (born 6 January 1983) is a Zimbabwean former cricketer. He played one first-class match for CFX Academy cricket team in 1999/00.

== Biography ==
Stone, whose cricket interest didn't stem directly from his family, attended Hellenic Junior School in Harare where sports coach Donald Mlambo nurtured his skills. His performance was impressive enough to make him captain of the national Under-13 side in his final year, and he also captained a junior school development team that played in Johannesburg. An all-rounder, Stone admits to struggling in one department while excelling in another, but lately has seen improvements in both areas.

As a pace bowler and often a top-three batter in school, Stone moved to middle-order batting, preferring positions five or six. His junior school career highlights include a top score of 98 against Barwick and nine for 13 against Sharon.

Stone briefly attended St. George's College before moving to St. John's College, where Peter Whalley coached him. As captain of both the national Under-14 and Under-16 teams, Stone averaged over 40 runs and took 38 wickets in a season. His performances included a 149-run inning against Peterhouse and six wickets for 20 runs against Lomagundi College.

Despite setbacks like an ankle injury from rugby and appendicitis, Stone applied for the Academy and was accepted after leaving St John's in his fourth-form year. He spent the 2000 Zimbabwean winter playing for Epsom in the Surrey Championship, which helped develop his game. Highlights include a batting score of 104 against Romany and taking five for 10 against Old Ruthlithians.

Stone took a brief vacation in Perth, Australia, where he met former Zimbabwe captain John Traicos and got some coaching sessions. He also gleaned tips from Barry Richards.

Stone made his first-class debut in the Logan Cup in 2000, but as one of the junior Academy members, he only played one match in the four-match program, scoring a few runs and failing to take a wicket.

== Personal life ==
Stone is related to Shaun Pollock, the South African captain, as a second cousin by marriage.
