= Karoi Rydings =

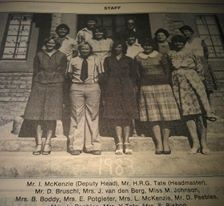
Staff members of Rydings College

Karoi Rydings is a school in Zimbabwe that was attacked by "squatters" in the year 2000 and thus closed. The 1,100 acre farm where the school sat upon was owned by British veterans and was invaded by "squatters". It was a primary school with three hundred pupils under eleven. It was managed by run by a non-profit-making organisation and the profit from the farm was used to subsidise school fees for white children from Zambia and Malawi.

== Notable alumni ==
- Greg Lamb – cricketer
