= 2010 Stanbic Bank 20 Series (November) =

2010–11 Stanbic Bank 20 Series
- Administrator: Zimbabwe Cricket
- Cricket format: Twenty20
- Tournament format(s): Group stage and knockout
- Champions: Mashonaland Eagles (1st title)
- Participants: 5
- Matches: 14
- Player of the series: Ryan Butterworth (Mashonaland Eagles)
- Most runs: 233 – Nick Compton (Mashonaland Eagles)
- Most wickets: 33 – Graeme Cremer (Mid West Rhinos); 33 – Chamu Chibhabha (Southern Rocks)

The 2010 Stanbic Bank 20 Series in November was a Twenty20 cricket competition held in Zimbabwe from 13 – 21 November 2010. It was won by the Mashonaland Eagles, who defeated the Mid West Rhinos in the final by one run.

The Eagles finished the group stage of the competition as the top team, losing only one match of the four-match round-robin. They then edged past the Tuskers in the first semi-final, winning a low-scoring match with their final pair of batsmen, passing their opponent's total of 70 with just nine balls remaining. They met the Rhinos in the final, where thanks to 74 runs from Nick Compton, a late unbeaten 39 runs off 17 balls from Andrew Hall, and economical bowling from Ray Price, they won by just one run. Compton finished the competition as the leading run-scorer, amassing 233 runs from his six matches, at an average of 38.83. Graeme Cremer and Chamu Chibhabha of the Southern Rocks and Mashonaland Eagles respectively claimed the most wickets, taking 11 each.

The competition also saw the return of Brian Lara to professional cricket after a two-year absence. Lara was described by international contemporary Kumar Sangakkara as "one of the greatest batsmen the world has seen", shortly after the West Indian's retirement from cricket. However, in early 2010 he had negotiations with Surrey to play Twenty20 cricket for them in the 2010 Friends Provident t20. When the talks fell through, Lara insisted that he still wanted to return to play Twenty20 cricket, a format which he hadn't played during his career. On 5 November, it was announced that he would join the Southern Rocks to play in the Stanbic Bank 20 Series. On his debut for the Rocks, and his first-ever Twenty20 match, he scored a half-century, top-scoring for the Rocks with 65. He added 34 runs in his next two innings, but then left the competition, citing "commitments elsewhere".

== Fixtures and results ==
=== Group stage ===
Team	Pld	W	L	T	N/R	Pts	Net R/R
Mashonaland Eagles	4	3	1	0	0	12	+0.739
Mid West Rhinos	4	2	2	0	0	8	−0.287
Southern Rocks	4	2	2	0	0	8	+0.313
Matabeleland Tuskers	4	2	2	0	0	8	−0.243
Mountaineers	4	1	3	0	0	4	−0.563

=== Knockout stage ===
Semi-finals
20 November – Harare
Matabeleland Tuskers	70 (19.2 ov)
Mashonaland Eagles	74/9 (18.3 ov)
20 November – Harare
Southern Rocks	151/8 (20 ov)
Mid West Rhinos	152/2 (18.3 ov)

Final
21 November – Harare
Mashonaland Eagles	167/7 (20 ov)
Mid West Rhinos	166/6 (20 ov)
Third place
21 November – Harare
Southern Rocks	154/8 (20 ov)
Matabeleland Tuskers	158/1 (18.2 ov)

==== Semi-finals ====
20 November
Scorecard

Matabeleland Tuskers; 70 (19.2 overs)	v	Mashonaland Eagles; 74/9 (18.3 overs)
Neil Carter 25 (33); Andrew Hall 3/12 (4 overs)		Ryan ten Doeschate 26 (47); Christopher Mpofu 2/9 (4 overs); Keagan Meth 2/9 (4 overs)

Mashonaland Eagles won by 1 wicket
Harare Sports Club, Harare
Umpires: Ian Robinson and Justice Tapfumaneyi
Player of the match: Andrew Hall (Eagles)

- Mashonaland Eagles won the toss and elected to field.

20 November
Scorecard

Southern Rocks; 151/8 (20 overs)	v	Mid West Rhinos; 152/2 (18.3 overs)
Tatenda Taibu 57 (51); Brendan Taylor 2/17 (4 overs)		Lou Vincent 75* (55); Michael Chinouya 1/26 (4 overs)

Mid West Rhinos won by 8 wickets
Harare Sports Club, Harare
Umpires: Owen Chirombe and Russell Tiffin
Player of the match: Vusimuzi Sibanda, Lou Vincent (Rhinos)

- Southern Rocks won the toss and elected to bat.

==== Third-place play-off ====
20 November
Scorecard

Southern Rocks; 154/8 (20 overs)	v	Matabeleland Tuskers; 158/1 (18.2 overs)
Tatenda Taibu 60 (37); Bradley Staddon 2/24 (4 overs)		Charles Coventry 67* (40); Elton Chigumbura 1/42 (4 overs)

Matabeleland Tuskers won by 9 wickets
Harare Sports Club, Harare
Umpires: Ian Robinson and Justice Tapfumaneyi
Player of the match: Charles Coventry (Tuskers)

- Matabeleland Tuskers won the toss and elected to field.

==== Final ====
20 November
Scorecard

Mashonaland Eagles; 167/7 (20 overs)	v	Mid West Rhinos; 166/6 (20 overs)
Nick Compton 74 (55); Malcolm Waller 2/23 (3 overs)		Vusimuzi Sibanda 46 (30); Ray Price 1/22 (4 overs)

Mashonaland Eagles won by 1 run
Harare Sports Club, Harare
Umpires: Owen Chirombe and Russell Tiffin
Player of the match: Andrew Hall (Eagles)

- Mashonaland Eagles won the toss and elected to bat.
