= Ryan Butterworth =

Zimbabwean cricketer

Personal information
- Full name: Ryan Eric Butterworth
- Born: 14 April 1981 (age 45); Salisbury, Zimbabwe
- Batting: Right-handed
- Bowling: Right-arm medium

Domestic team information
- Years: Team
- 2000/01: CFX Academy
- 2001/02–2003/04: Mashonaland
- 2004/05: Manicaland
- 2005/06: Midlands
- 2009/10–2010/11: Mashonaland Eagles
- FC debut: 16 February 2001 CFX Academy v Mashonaland
- LA debut: 4 April 2001 CFX Academy v Bangladeshis

Career statistics
Competition	FC	LA	T20
Matches	29	24	8
Runs scored	1,309	288	175
Batting average	26.71	16.00	43.75
100s/50s	3/1	0/0	0/1
Top score	113	45	52*
Balls bowled	270	114	126
Wickets	6	3	6
Bowling average	29.33	21.66	19.83
5 wickets in innings	0	0	0
10 wickets in match	0	0	0
Best bowling	2/27	2/11	3/20
Catches/stumpings	22/–	10/–	2/–
- Source: CricketArchive, 24 November 2011

Ryan Eric Butterworth (born 14 April 1981) is a Zimbabwean former cricketer who played for the Mashonaland Eagles. He is a right-handed batsman, and right-arm medium-pace bowler, and is described as a batting all-rounder.

Butterworth attended Gateway Primary School in Harare, where his cricketing ability was immediately apparent, as he captained the team during most of his time there. His best performances with both bat and ball came against Eaglesvale School, against whom he scored 96 not out and claimed eight wickets in separate matches. In 1993, he was captain of the Harare Schools B team in national primary schools week. He advanced to Prince Edward School, where he also captained teams throughout his years at the school, although cricket was not his main sport, instead taking third place behind swimming and triathlon. He was a member of the school's first team for four years, where his best score was 133 not out against Peterhouse Boys' School.

Butterworth made his first-class debut in 2001, appearing for the CFX Academy. He played five first-class matches for the team, scoring 182 runs; though over half of these came in just one of his eight innings, when he reached 113. The amount of first-class cricket he played decreased over each of the following seasons, and he did not play at all between the 2004–05 and 2007–08 seasons. He played a vastly increased number of matches in 2009–10, appearing 12 times for the Mashonaland Eagles, averaging over 30 with the bat, and passing 100 on two occasions.

Butterworth spent two seasons as a professional for Whitehaven Cricket Club in Cumbria scoring over 1800 runs and taking 93 wickets over the two seasons.

In 2010–11, Butterworth was named as the player of the series in the Stanbic Bank 20 Series, scoring 165 runs at an average of 82.50. His performance in this tournament also saw him called up to the Zimbabwe national squad for the One Day International tour to Bangladesh.
