= Kingsley Went =

Zimbabwean cricketer (born 1981)

Personal information
- Born: 19 August 1981 (age 45); Harare, Zimbabwe
- Source: ESPNcricinfo, 8 December 2016

Kingsley Went (born 19 August 1981) is a Zimbabwean former cricketer. He played sixteen first-class matches between 1999 and 2005.

== Biography ==
Born in Harare, Went has spent most of his life in Mutare, with a family lineage tracing back to Kingsley Fairbridge. He found his passion for cricket at Hillcrest Primary School, and his skill gradually grew, leading him to consider a professional career in the sport.

His school cricket career was marked by impressive performances as an opening batter and wicket-keeper. His transition to focus on off-breaks was influenced by a conversation with Mike Whiley of the Zimbabwe Cricket Union. Despite this shift, he still played as a wicket-keeper occasionally.

Went excelled in school cricket, with standout scores of 122 not out against a visiting school from Norwich, England, 103 against a Hillcrest Old Boys team, and 99 against Watershed. He served as the vice-captain for most of his teams and captained in his final year, 1999.

Went started playing club cricket in Mutare at the age of 15, first for his school team, then for Mutare Sports Club, eventually joining the Manicaland team. While he didn't frequently use his bowling skills during this time, Went views bowling as his secondary skill rather than wicket-keeping.

Went studied business management, geography, and maths at A-level. His career aspirations include joining the Zimbabwe A team and the full national side.

A slipped disc during his only first-class match for the academy halted his season. Upon recovery, he played successfully for Upminster in Essex, scoring nine half-centuries in 18 games. He later returned to the academy, where he developed his skills under the mentorship of Dave Houghton.

In 2000, he played in England again, this time for Ely and Haddenham in the Cambridgeshire league, where he averaged over 40 with the bat and had a top score of 130. In 2002, he played for South Oxford and Lister.

Part of the national league-winning Mutare Sports Club team in 2001/02, Went excelled as a batter, favoring a slow start at the crease before ramping up his scoring rate.

Went has represented Manicaland in men's hockey and enjoys golf and tennis recreationally.

== See also ==
- CFX Academy cricket team
