= Ian Coulson =

Zimbabwean cricketer (born 1980)

Personal information
- Born: 5 April 1980 (age 46); Bulawayo, Zimbabwe
- Source: ESPNcricinfo, 7 December 2016

Ian Coulson (born 5 April 1980) is a Zimbabwean cricketer. He played eleven first-class matches between 2000 and 2003.

== Biography ==
Coulson was born in Bulawayo and raised in Esigodini, Matabeleland. He began cricket at Whitestone Primary School, gradually advancing to the first team.

Coulson played for Falcon College's first team for three years, achieving seven for 19 against Plumtree as his best figures. He represented Matabeleland at both Under-15 and Under-19 levels. During this time, he also played winter cricket for Esigodeni and was invited by Noel Peck to join the Queens Sports Club in Bulawayo. His top score in any class of cricket is 53 against Harare Sports Club Second XI.

In 1998, Coulson became a qualified computer technician and worked at Queens Sports Club before joining the Academy. His impressive performance in a 2000 match led to an invitation from Academy director Gwynne Jones to apply to the Academy, which accepted him.

== See also ==
- CFX Academy cricket team
