= Andre Hoffman =

Zimbabwean cricketer (born 1978)

Personal information
- Born: 23 April 1978 (age 48); Harare, Zimbabwe
- Source: ESPNcricinfo, 7 December 2016

Andre Hoffman (born 23 April 1978) is a Zimbabwean former cricketer. He played eighteen first-class matches between 1999 and 2003.

== Biography ==
Andre Hoffman was born to a rugby-oriented family. He developed an interest in cricket, fostered by his older brother.

His early education took place at North Park and later Barwick, where he made significant strides in cricket. A notable achievement was taking nine wickets for 30 runs during Zimbabwe Under-13 team trials. His success carried onto the Mashonaland Country Districts Under-13 team's tour to England, highlighted by an 86-run score against a Sussex team. High school at Watershed further shaped his cricket career, playing alongside Raymond Price, and leading to his ascension to the senior team. However, a back injury during this period affected his bowling and overall confidence.

In his fourth form, Hoffman achieved an impressive seven consecutive fifties but admits to fewer centuries due to concentration lapses. His cricketing journey included representing Zimbabwe in various age-group teams and a spot in the Under-19 team for the 1997 England tour.

Hoffman has been with Harare Sports Club since the age of 14, showcasing noteworthy performances in the 2001/02 season and playing for the Watershed winter league cricket team. Seeking overseas experience, he spent three seasons in the UK, performing notably with Alderley Edge in 1999, despite a shin splint injury.

== See also ==
- CFX Academy cricket team
