= Andre Neethling =

Zimbabwean cricketer (born 1979)

Personal information
- Full name: Andre John Carl Neethling
- Born: 3 July 1979 (age 47); Harare, Zimbabwe
- Source: Cricinfo, 7 December 2016

Andre Neethling (born 3 July 1979) is a Zimbabwean former cricketer. He played seven first-class matches between 2000 and 2002.

== Biography ==
Andre Neethling developed his interest for cricket due to his mother's then-partner, Kevin Walters, who played cricket with him at a young age. Despite no familial connections to cricket and a slow start at Eaglesvale Primary School, Andre found his footing by Grade Seven.

His cricketing skills advanced in Form One at St. John's College, which led to his selection for the national Under-15 team. He excelled both as a batsman, scoring four school centuries, and a bowler, securing eight wickets against Hillcrest College. His highest score ever was 139 not out, a record that remains unbroken. In 1997, he joined the Under-19 team's tour of England but was limited due to bronchitis. Interestingly, Andre's exceptional eight-wicket performance came from seam bowling. However, Bill Flower, father of Test players Andy Flower and Grant Flower, saw potential in Andre as a leg-spin bowler. His guidance helped Andre develop a successful leg-spin technique, along with a top-spinner, arm ball, and a still erratic googly. Andre cites Bill as his career's most influential figure.

In 1997, Andre joined Old Georgians Sports Club, where he continues to play. Despite a preference for batting third or fourth, he has often opened, scoring over 400 runs in the 2000/01 season. His bowling skills were less utilized due to the presence of another promising leg-spinner, Stephen Wright.

After leaving St John's in 1997, Andre attended Ilsa College to complete his O-levels. He then worked with his father and stepfather before undertaking an A+ computer course and obtaining an international driver's license. Initially unsuccessful in joining the CFX Academy in 2000, he re-applied the following year with encouragement from his mother and was accepted.
