= Conan Brewer =

Zimbabwean cricketer (born 1982)

Personal information
- Born: 1 September 1982 (age 44); Harare, Zimbabwe
- Source: ESPNcricinfo, 6 December 2016

Conan Brewer (born 30 September 1982) is a Zimbabwean former cricketer. He played thirteen first-class matches between 2001 and 2004.

== Career ==
Brewer early exposure to cricket began at Lilfordia Primary School, under the guidance of Iain Campbell. As an opening batsman, he consistently scored in the thirties and forties, and later demonstrated his skills at Prince Edward High School, scoring significant runs against various teams.

Brewer served as captain of the school's first team in Form Three, but relinquished the role in his final two years due to the pressure of captaincy combined with wicket-keeping and opening the batting. Conan's representative cricket career began at the Under-19 level, participating in two Under-19 Cricket World Cups and touring with the Zimbabwe Development team.

Conan also played for Old Hararians Sports Club in Harare, often opening the innings, and has delivered numerous fifties and a high score of 94. He also played for Mvurwi in the Mashonaland Districts winter cricket league. He was influenced by Steve Rhodes, former Worcestershire wicket-keeper, and Dave Houghton, his coach at the academy.

== See also ==
- CFX Academy cricket team
