= Jordane Nicolle =

Zimbabwean cricketer (born 1982)

Personal information
- Born: 20 December 1982 (age 43); Bulawayo, Zimbabwe
- Source: ESPNcricinfo, 7 December 2016

Jordane Nicolle (born 20 December 1982) is a Zimbabwean cricketer. He played fourteen first-class matches between 2001 and 2005.

== Education ==
Nicolle attended Falcon College before studying for a year at Stellenbosch University.

== See also ==
- CFX Academy cricket team
