= Gordon Den =

South African cricketer (born 1939)

Personal information
- Born: 11 July 1939 (age 87); Salisbury, Rhodesia
- Batting: Right-handed
- Bowling: Left arm fast-medium
- Role: Bowler

Domestic team information
- Years: Team
- Eastern Province
- Source: Cricinfo, 15 November 2022

Gordon Den (born 11 July 1939) is a Rhodesian cricketer. He played 27 first-class matches between 1963/64 and 1969/70 and 2 List A matches in the 1969/70 season.

He is the uncle of current Zimbabwe international Craig Ervine, former Zimbabwe international Sean Ervine, and Ryan Ervine, who played domestic limited overs cricket in Zimbabwe in 2009/10 season. Den's father, Alexander is recorded as having made one appearance for Rhodesia against the touring Australian national side in 1936.
