= Gregg Haakonsen =

Zimbabwean cricketer (born 1980)

Personal information
- Born: 10 May 1980 (age 46); Gweru, Zimbabwe
- Source: ESPNcricinfo, 7 December 2016

Gregg Haakonsen (born 10 May 1980) is a Zimbabwean former cricketer. He played four first-class matches for CFX Academy cricket team in 1999/2000.

== Biography ==
Haakonsen was introduced to cricket by his family. He excelled in the sport at Selborne Primary and Kingswood College in South Africa. Representing national teams from the Under-12 level onwards, he gained considerable experience through international tours.

However, Haakonsen took a brief hiatus from cricket due to selection issues. During a yearly visit to his family in Gweru, Zimbabwe, his performances for the local church team drew attention, leading to an invitation to the CFX Academy in 2000.

While awaiting his entry into the Academy, Haakonsen improved his fitness and underwent bowling action modification under coach Carl Rackemann.
