= Jason Young (Zimbabwean cricketer) =

Zimbabwean cricketer (born 1979)

Personal information
- Born: 22 July 1979 (age 47); Harare, Zimbabwe
- Source: ESPNcricinfo, 8 December 2016

Jason Young (born 22 July 1979) is a Zimbabwean cricketer. He played eight first-class matches between 1999 and 2001.

== Career ==
Young attended the CFX Academy. Initially a bowling-focused all-rounder, Young's batting prowess shone during his first-class debut in the 1999–2000 Logan Cup. He is not from a cricketing family but got involved with the sport at Eaglesvale Preparatory School.

His early cricket career was marked by achievements, including making it to the school's first team in Form Three and captaining it for most of his high-school years. He made strides on the national stage, playing for the national Under-19 team, participating in the 1998 Under-19 Cricket World Cup in South Africa, and attending a coaching course with former England all-rounder Robin Jackman in 1997.

After high school, Young played club cricket for Harare Sports Club before moving to Alexandra Sports Club to further develop his game. Despite a back injury in 1999, he was able to play for the Australian Academy and spent two successful seasons with Barnard's Green in Worcestershire.

Young made several changes to his game, including adjustments to his bowling action, grip, and batting style under the guidance of Carl Rackemann and Murray Goodwin. He also developed a useful slower ball and refined his fielding skills. In 2001, he prepared to play for Tamworth in Staffordshire, England, while continuing his contributions to Alexandra Sports Club and Mutare Sports Club in Zimbabwe.

== See also ==
- CFX Academy cricket team
