= Sherezad Shah =

Zimbabwean cricketer (born 1983)

Personal information
- Born: 1 August 1983 (age 43); Harare, Zimbabwe
- Source: ESPNcricinfo, 8 December 2016

Sherezad Shah (born 1 August 1983) is a Zimbabwean cricketer. He played three first-class matches between 2001 and 2002.

== Biography ==
Sherezad Shah was born in a cricketing family. He is the nephew of former Test all-rounder Ali Shah, who remains his mentor.

Sherezad embarked on his cricket journey around the age of four, under Ali's guidance. Despite a brief interruption due to his family's relocation to South Africa in 1991, his structured cricket career flourished in Nelspruit.

Earning a place in his school's first team at the Under-15 level, Sherezad also played for the Lowveld team and the Impala club. In 2000, he returned to Zimbabwe, aspiring for a position in the national Under-19 team. He was selected for the team for the Under-19 Cricket World Cup, although he didn't play any matches. His participation in a quadrangular tournament led to a notable performance against Kenya.

Sherezad had short tenures with Prince Edward School and Ali's club, Universals, where he displayed competence in pace bowling and batting. Primarily a bowler, Sherezad also focused on improving his batting skills. With Ali's support, he joined the CFX Academy in 2002, with a lower back injury delaying his Logan Cup debut.

His notable achievements include scoring "60 not out for Prince Edward School on a South African tour, and taking four wickets for 28 runs."

== See also ==
- CFX Academy cricket team
