= Arnold Rushambwa =

Zimbabwean cricketer (born 1982)

Personal information
- Full name: Arnold Rushambwa
- Born: 1 March 1982 (age 44); Harare, Zimbabwe
- Batting: Right-handed
- Bowling: Right-arm fast-medium

Domestic team information
- Years: Team
- 2002: CFX Academy
- First-class debut: 1 March 2002 CFX Academy v Mashonaland
- Last First-class: 5 April 2002 CFX Academy v Midlands

Career statistics
Competition	First-class
Matches	3
Runs scored	12
Batting average	2.00
100s/50s	0/0
Top score	6
Balls bowled	108
Wickets	2
Bowling average	25.00
5 wickets in innings	0
10 wickets in match	0
Best bowling	1/16
Catches/stumpings	0/–
- Source: CricketArchive, 25 January 2011

Arnold Rushambwa (born March 1, 1982) was a Zimbabwean cricketer. He was a right-handed batsman and a right-arm medium-fast bowler who played for CFX Academy. He was born in Harare.

Rushambwa made three appearances for the team during the Logan Cup competition of 2001–02. Following an unsteady start, in which, in the second innings of his debut match, he made a duck, he was pushed down to the tailend in the batting lineup, where he played his final two games of the competition.

Rushambwa took two wickets with the ball, bowling eighteen overs. He is brother to Munyaradzi Rushambwa, Tinashe Rushambwa and Kudakwashe Rushambwa.
