= Innocent Chinyoka =

Zimbabwean cricketer (born 1982)

Personal information
- Born: 21 June 1982 (age 44); Harare, Zimbabwe
- Source: ESPNcricinfo, 7 September 2016

Innocent Chinyoka (born 21 June 1982) is a Zimbabwean former first-class cricketer who played for Mashonaland Eagles.

== Career ==
Chinyoka cricket career began in Harare's David Livingstone Primary School, extending through Allan Wilson High School and culminating at the Uprising club. After a cricket stint in England in 2000, Chinyoka returned to Zimbabwe, scoring personal bests and securing a spot in the CFX Academy. Known for his adept batting and fielding, Chinyoka credits his mother's support and player-coach Claudius Mukandiwa for his professional growth.
