= Campbell Macmillan =

Zimbabwean cricketer (born 1982)

Personal information
- Born: 16 April 1982 (age 44); Harare, Zimbabwe
- Source: ESPNcricinfo, 7 December 2016

Campbell Macmillan (born 16 April 1982) is a Zimbabwean former cricketer. He played twenty first-class matches between 2000 and 2005.

== Biography ==
McMillan attended Harare's CFX Academy and was recognized as a standout school cricketer in 2000. His cricketing interest was developed by his father, a former club player. Raised in a farming family that frequently relocated, Campbell lived with his mother in Harare after his parents' divorce. His formal cricket education began at Springvale House in Marondera, where he developed from a reluctant participant to a talented all-rounder under his coach, named Jogee.

His skill progression led to selections for the national Under-14, Under-16, and Under-19 teams. Despite a back injury, he secured six wickets in the 2000 Under-19 Cricket World Cup in Sri Lanka and later participated in a Zimbabwe Development tour to Kenya. His high school career highlights included scoring 87 off 46 balls in a critical match against Falcon College and achieving three five-wicket hauls, including a seven-wicket stand against Hilton College.

On his own initiative, McMillan applied to the CFX Academy for 2001. While high school limited his club cricket participation, he played winter cricket for Hwedza following brief stints with Watershed XI and Ruzawi River. His notable performances included scoring 67 against Goromonzi and a five-wicket haul against Harare South. He has also been associated with Alexandra Sports Club in Harare.

== See also ==
- CFX Academy cricket team
