= Matthew Townshend =

Zimbabwean cricketer (born 1982)

Personal information
- Born: 5 March 1982 (age 44); Mutare, Zimbabwe
- Source: ESPNcricinfo, 8 December 2016

Matthew Townshend (born 5 March 1982) is a Zimbabwean former cricketer. He played nine first-class matches between 1999 and 2002.

== Biography ==
Mathew Townshend developed his cricketing skills under the influence of his father, Derrick, and uncle, Trevor, both former Rhodesia players. His early introduction to cricket was under his father's guidance, leading to his primary role as a pace bowler and a robust lower-order batsman.

Townshend's cricket career began at St. Thomas Aquinas Primary School, and continued to Christian Brothers College (CBC), where he frequently captained his age-group teams. His performance in the first team at CBC was notable, achieving a batting average of about 70 in his final season.

Townshend represented the Under-14, Under-16, and Under-19 teams, excelling in the Zimbabwe Development tour to Kenya in 2000 despite facing injury challenges. He joined Bulawayo Athletic Club and later the CFX Academy in 2000, aligning with Alexandra Sports Club in Harare and earning praise for several standout performances.

While still at high school, Townshend made his first-class cricket debut for Matabeleland, taking six wickets at an average of 31 in three matches and maintaining a batting average of 22. His cricketing development owes much to the mentorship of Dave Houghton and Win Justin-Smith.

== See also ==
- CFX Academy cricket team
