= 2010–11 Zimbabwean cricket season =

International matches played by the Zimbabwean cricket team

- Cricket formats: International and domestic

The 2010–11 Zimbabwean cricket season consists of international matches played by the Zimbabwean cricket team as well as Zimbabwean domestic cricket matches under the auspices of Zimbabwe Cricket.

== International cricket ==
=== Fifth match: Ireland ===
20 –23 September 2010
Scorecard

Ireland	v	Zimbabwe XI
465 (134.5 overs); Andrew White 102 (176); Shingirai Masakadza 5/107 (29 overs)		590 (173.2 overs); Sean Williams 178 (280); Kevin O'Brien 4/104 (30.2 overs)
151/4 (54 overs); William Porterfield 66 (104); Vusi Sibanda 1/3 (5 overs)

Match drawn
Harare Sports Club, Harare, Zimbabwe
Umpires: Shaun George (SA) and Russell Tiffin (Zim)

- Ireland won the toss and elected to bat.
- Points: Zimbabwe XI 9, Ireland 3.

=== Sixth match: Scotland ===
26 – 29 September 2010
Scorecard

Zimbabwe XI	v	Scotland

Scotland won (walkover without a ball bowled)
Harare Sports Club, Harare, Zimbabwe

- Points: Scotland 20, Zimbabwe XI 0.

=== ODI series ===
- Irish cricket team in Zimbabwe in 2010–11
- Zimbabwean cricket team in South Africa in 2010–11
- Zimbabwean cricket team in Bangladesh in 2010–11
- 2011 Cricket World Cup

== Domestic cricket ==
=== Logan Cup ===
- In progress

=== Metbank Pro40 Championship ===
- In progress

=== Stanbic Bank 20 Series ===
- Winners Mashonaland Eagles
