= Andrew Stone (computer programmer) =

American computer programmer

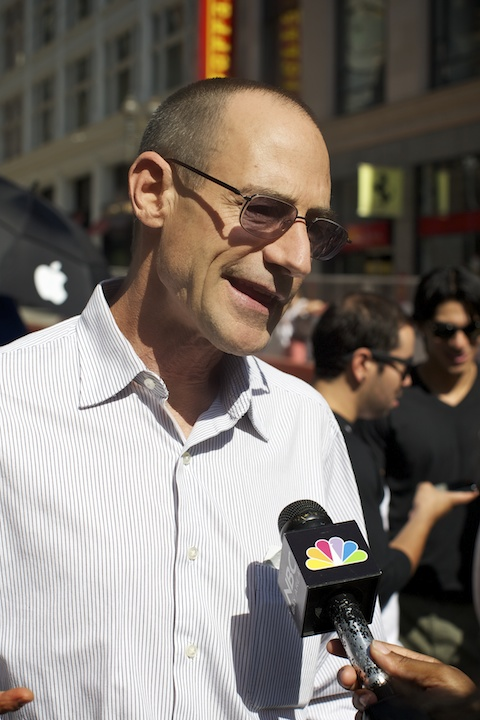
- Andrew C. Stone
- Born: June 12, 1956 (age 70); Cincinnati, Ohio
- Occupations: Computer programmer, former architect
- Website: stone.com

Andrew "Andy" C. Stone is an American computer programmer known for creating Twittelator, an iOS application for the iPhone and iPad. He is the founder of Stone Design Corporation, a software company based in Albuquerque, New Mexico, where he served as director and principal programmer. During his career, Stone developed more than 35 software titles for HyperCard, NeXT workstations, Mac OS X and iOS. He retired from software development in 2015. In his 25 plus year career as a programmer, he has published over 35 software titles for Hypercard, the NeXT workstation, Mac OS X, and for iOS iPhones and iPads. He retired from software development in 2015.

He was a contributing author to the Waite Group's Tricks of the HyperTalk Masters .

Stone developed software for Sandia National Laboratories called ProtoTymer.

== Career ==
Stone became the first independent developer to release a commercial shrink-wrapped product for the NeXT Computer, TextArt, in October 1989. The software enabled users to manipulate PostScript text through graphical controls and later evolved into Create, a drawing application released in 1991. Stone Design also developed DataPhile, a multimedia database manager, and distributed its products through the Electronic AppWrapper, an early electronic software distribution service.

Stone Design was appreciated in electronic software distribution on NeXT and was a constant advertising presence on the first ever app store which was also invented using NeXT tools, The Electronic AppWrapper. According to an employee at the Paget Press (the startup responsible for the first app store) it was originally AppWrapper #3 that was first demonstrated to Steve Jobs and showcased Stone Design Apps.

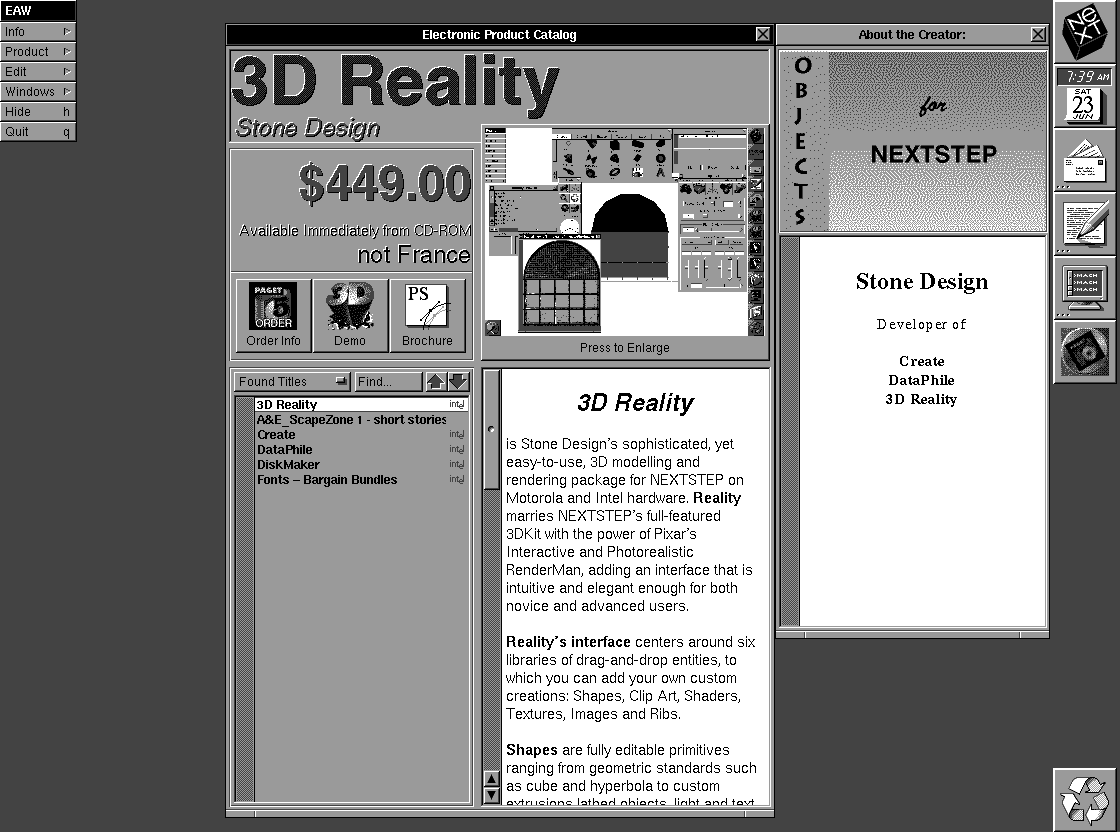
A Screen Shot of Stone Design's 3DReality running on the Electronic AppWrapper, the first app store

Stone was known for the rave parties he organized with John Perry Barlow over a three-year period. The first party was held at the Exploratorium in October 1992. The party brought together LSD and NSA.

Stone's participation with the first government sanctioned Dimethyltryptamine research with Dr. Rick Strassman in Albuquerque in the early 1990s led to a collaboration in the underwriting of DMT: The Spirit Molecule: A Doctor's Revolutionary Research into the Biology of Near-Death and Mystical Experiences, documenting the research. Andrew Stone was a featured DMT volunteer in the documentary film DMT - The Spirit Molecule. Andrew Stone serves on the board of the Cottonwood Research Foundation with Dr. Strassman, which provides scientific research into the nature of consciousness.

Between that time and Apple's purchase of the NeXT Corporation in December 1996, Stone Design developed a number of other products for the NeXT, including 3DReality, a 3D modeling and rendering package and CheckSum, a personal finance application.

Following Apple's acquisition of NeXT in December 1996, Stone participated in efforts to introduce NeXTSTEP to Macintosh users and developers. He demonstrated the Create application during keynote presentations at Macworld Boston and Apple's Worldwide Developers Conference in 1997. He also contributed articles to MacTech magazine.

Stone Design subsequently developed software for the pre-Mac OS X Macintosh platform. Its applications included PhotoToWeb, SliceAndDice, PStill, TimeEqualsMoney, PackUpAndGo and GIFfun. The company later grouped several of these programs into software collections marketed as Stone Studio and Stone Works.

In 2008, Stone began to release apps for the iPhone. His first product, Twittelator, became one of the best selling apps for the micro-blogging service Twitter. Other products included iGraffiti, TalkingPics, Gesture, MobileMix, Soundbite, Pulsar, iCreated, TweetTV and Intentionizer. He has contributed to other apps such as 140Characters, The Daily, Wine.com for iPad, WeGetIn, Trekaroo and Bandojo.

== Personal life ==
Since his retirement in 2015, Stone spends his time working on his organic farm, doing yoga, reading, hiking, and advocating for solar energy. He's married to internationally syndicated children's public radio producer Katie Stone, and has four children and four grandchildren. He has written an extensive number of articles on programming with the Cocoa code base. He also spearheaded a group called “the Cocoa Conspiracy,” a loose knit ad hoc professional organization for iOS app developers based in New Mexico.

== Interviews with the Press ==
- Davis, Erik (August 23, 2012). "Interviews Andrew Stone on Expanding Mind". prn.fm. Archived from the original on August 31, 2012.
- Mac Observer Interviews Andrew Stone
- Wired UK Interviews Andrew Stone
- Business Week article features Andrew Stone
- Software Design Magazine Interviews Andrew Stone
- Ecker, Clint (June 16, 2007). "Ars at WWDC: Video interview with Andrew Stone of Stone Design (Updated)". Ars Technica.
- MacVoices audio Interview with Andrew Stone
- "TUAW Video Interview with Andrew Stone". tuaw.com. June 13, 2009. Archived from the original on June 16, 2009.
- AppCraver Interviews Andrew Stone
- Ecker, Clint (June 16, 2007). "Ars at WWDC: Video interview with Andrew Stone of Stone Design (Updated)". Ars Technica.

== Notes ==
- ZDNet acclaims Twittelator Neue
- ABQ Journal 'Twitter Guru' Andrew Stone
- Albuquerque Apps Developer Brings Programmers Together
- Wired Magazine Could Mac OS X be 'Holy Grail'?
- Complete 1991-1994 NeXTWORLD Magazines Archive
