= Justin Lewis (cricketer) =

Zimbabwean cricketer (born 1982)

Personal information
- Born: 30 December 1982 (age 43); Redcliff, Zimbabwe
- Source: ESPNcricinfo, 22 January 2021

Justin Lewis (born 30 December 1982) is a Zimbabwean cricketer. He played twenty-five first-class matches between 1999 and 2011.

== Career ==
Justin Lewis got his start playing cricket in their garden at age four. He started playing cricket in Grade Three at Goldridge Primary School, where he was promoted to the school senior team in Grade Four. He was initially more focused on batting, achieving his best score of 30 not out. Lewis began as a leg-spin bowler but shifted to seam around 1997–98.

During high school, Lewis attended Plumtree School before moving to Camelot High School in Kwekwe. He achieved significant milestones including scoring 177 not out against Kwekwe College and making the Midlands Under-16 team.

Lewis changed his bowling style inspired by Wasim Akram and joined the Queens cricket club in Kwekwe at 13. He progressed quickly to their first team, obtaining his best figures of five for 23 against Kadoma. Despite being a capable batsman, he was often positioned low in the batting order.

Lewis briefly captained his school side and spent the English season of 2000 in Hertford. At 17, he competed in the Logan Cup and joined the CFX Academy in 2001. He later represented Kwekwe Districts and Midlands team in the Logan Cup.

== See also ==
- CFX Academy cricket team
