= Kudzai Sauramba =

Zimbabwean cricketer (born 1992)

Personal information
- Full name: Kudzai Leon Sauramba
- Born: 24 January 1992 (age 34); Mutare, Zimbabwe
- Batting: Right-handed
- Role: Wicket-keeper
- Source: ESPNcricinfo

Kudzai Sauramba (born 24 January 1992 in Mutare) is a Zimbabwean first-class cricketer. He currently plays as a wicket-keeper for the Mountaineers cricket team. In July 2010, he was part of Zimbabwe's national under-19 cricket team when they hosted South Africa's national under-19 cricket team. In December 2020, he was selected to play for the Mountaineers in the 2020–21 Logan Cup.
