= Wisdom Siziba =

Zimbabwean cricketer (1980–2009)

Personal information
- Full name: Wisdom Thomas Siziba
- Born: 26 October 1980; Bulawayo, Zimbabwe
- Died: 15 April 2009 (aged 28); South Africa
- Batting: Right-handed
- Role: Wicket-keeper

Domestic team information
- Years: Team
- 1999/00–2004/05: Matebeleland
- FC debut: 10 March 2000 Matabeleland v Manicaland
- Last FC: 28 February 2005 Zimbabwe A v Bangladesh A
- LA debut: 4 April 2001 CFX Academy v Bangladesh
- Last LA: 22 November 2004 Matabeleland v Midlands

Career statistics
Competition	First-class	List A
Matches	29	17
Runs scored	1,225	168
Batting average	23.11	12.92
100s/50s	1/5	0/0
Top score	103	42
Catches/stumpings	37/1	13/4
- Source: CricketArchive, 23 April 2009

Wisdom Thomas Siziba (26 October 1980 – 15 April 2009) was a Zimbabwean cricketer who played for Matabeleland. Siziba played 29 matches as a wicket-keeper batsman for Matabeleland between 2000 and 2005 before leaving for South Africa as the cricketing infrastructure in Zimbabwe began to fall apart.

Born in Bulawayo, Siziba suffered from epilepsy. He died from heart failure while living in South Africa, aged 28.
