= Neetan Chouhan =

Zimbabwean cricketer (born 1983)

Personal information
- Born: 3 April 1983 (age 43); Harare, Zimbabwe
- Source: ESPNcricinfo, 7 December 2016

Neetan Chouhan (born 3 April 1983) is a Zimbabwean former cricketer. He played twenty first-class matches between 2000 and 2007.

== Career ==
Chouhan was introduced to cricket by his father, Nick, a former player and long-term administrator at the Mashonaland Cricket Union. Chouhan initially played for Selborne Routledge Primary School, Harare, before moving to Sharon School.

His cricketing prowess emerged at the age of 10, and he pivoted to leg-spin in high school, impressively claiming five wickets in his debut spin attempt. His school years were filled with representation at different levels, including the national Under-16 team, Mashonaland sides, and a Zimbabwe development tour to Kenya. His best batting performance was 104 not out against Watershed School.

Upon school graduation in 2001, Chouhan joined the CFX Academy, and simultaneously navigated club cricket, moving from Sunrise to Old Hararians and finally Universals to seek higher-level competition. He primarily fielded in the cover area and occasionally at short leg.

== See also ==
- CFX Academy cricket team
