= H. Richard Winn =

American neurosurgeon

- Born: 1943 (age 82–83)
- Occupations: Neurosurgeon and professor

Dr. H. Richard Winn is an American neurosurgeon, and professor of neurosurgery and neuroscience at Mount Sinai School of Medicine. Winn was chairman of neurological surgery at the University of Washington School of Medicine from 1983 to 2002. Winn has made numerous contributions to the field of neurosurgery, specifically to the physiology of cerebral blood flow regulation and clinical studies of the natural history of cerebral aneurysms. A leading international Neurosurgical Prize is named after Dr. Winn.

== Career ==
=== Training ===
Winn trained in neurological surgery at the University of Virginia in Charlottesville under John A. Jane. During residency he spent time in England at Atkinson Morley's Hospital and had the opportunity start clinical research on the natural history of cerebral aneurysms working with Alan Richardson and pursuing long-term outcome studies initiated by Sir Wylie McKissock. Following military service with the US Army in Germany, Winn returned to Charlottesville where he pursued basic science training in cardiovascular and cerebrovascular physiology under the direction of Robert M. Berne, professor of physiology, and began his studies on the role of adenosine and cerebral blood flow regulation. He has been continuously funded by the NIH since 1974 for this ongoing effort.

=== Positions ===
Winn held faculty positions in the departments of neurosurgery and physiology at the University of Virginia, rising to full professor and vice chairman of neurological surgery. In 1983 Winn moved to the University of Washington as professor and chairman of the department of neurological surgery with joint professorship in the department of physiology and biophysics. In February 2002, Winn was asked by UW administrators to step down temporarily in the midst of a federal criminal investigation into possible billing fraud. In July, 2002 Winn pleaded guilty to one obstruction of justice charge and agreed to resign his position as chairman of the Neurosurgery Department at the University of Washington, as well as his operating privileges at Harborview Medical Center. Winn obstructed the investigation by instructing doctors to lie to investigators and the federal grand jury about potentially incriminating information, according to charging papers. He also provided "false exculpatory information" to doctors and staff so that they would lie, prosecutors say in the documents. U.S. District Court Judge Robert Lasnik accepted a plea deal worked out by federal prosecutors, Winn's attorneys and the University of Washington that allowed Winn to serve 1,000 hours of community service, pay a $4,000 fine and repay $500,000 to government programs serving the poor and elderly. Judge Lasnik accepted Winn's proposal to serve his community service in Nepal. Winn was also required to serve 5 years of probation. Winn's separation agreement with the University provided $3.7 million to Dr. Winn in exchange for resigning and dropping any legal challenges to this plea deal. In 2003, after spending several months as a visiting professor in the department of surgery (neurosurgery) at Tribhuvan University Teaching Hospital in Kathmandu, Nepal, he moved to Mount Sinai Medical School where he was appointed as a tenured professor in the departments of neurosurgery and neuroscience. In 2010, Winn was appointed director of neurosurgery at Lenox Hill Hospital (NYC) and in 2013 returned to Mount Sinai with appointments in neurosurgery and neuroscience.

=== Awards ===
Winn was awarded a Jacob Javits Neuroscience Investigator Award from the NIH. Other honors include being selected a fellow of the American Association for the Advancement of Science (1992) "for studies in cerebral metabolism and for pioneering investigations defining the physiologic regulation of brain blood flow," the Wakeman Award for Research in the Neurosciences (1990), the Sir Wylie McKissock Neuroscience Prize (1992) from St. George's Medical School, London and the Grass Foundation Award (1999) from the Society of Neurological Surgery "for excellence in research contributions in the areas of science and academic neurosurgery." He also received the Distinguished Alumnus Award from the Haverford School (2000) and the Distinguished Service Award from the Society of Neurological Surgeons (2005). .

== The Winn Prize ==
The H. Richard Winn, M.D. Prize is an annual award established in presented by of the Society of Neurological Surgeons to encourage research in the neurosciences and to recognize outstanding, continuous commitment to research in the neurosciences by a neurological surgeon. The Society of Neurological Surgeons is the American society of leaders in neurosurgical residency education, and is the oldest neurosurgical society in the world.
