= Nyasha Michelle =

British television personality

- Born: Nyasha Michelle; Harare, Zimbabwe
- Education: City University
- Occupations: Journalist, presenter
- Notable credit(s): BBC What's New, BBC Focus on Africa, BBC My World, BBC iPlayer

Nyasha Michelle is a Zimbabwean-British television personality, broadcast-video journalist and producer at the British Broadcasting Corporation. She is also a podcaster, she hosts With Nyasha Michelle.

== Background ==
Michelle was born and raised in Harare, Zimbabwe. She then moved to the United Kingdom where she studied TV journalism at City, University of London and has a BSc degree in international hospitality and tourism management from Surrey University.

Nyasha Michelle began her journalism career as a radio presenter at WPB Radio on a show called FM Radio 101 in US. She then started television presenting in 2015 on Christ Embassy's Loveworld TV where she presented on Totally Addicted show as well as her show called Living Boldly. In 2017 Michelle joined the BBC as an assistant for a primetime programme The One Show. She assisted on over 100 shoots across the UK. In 2018, she was on the camera crew for a shoot on the PBS documentary, When Harry Met Meghan. In 2019 she became a producer and reporter for "BBC What’s New" which she began presenting on Mugabe's Life and Legacy, a documentary that was showcased after he died.

Michelle was a producer and reporter on BBC My World, a programme that is executive produced by Angelina Jolie. In 2021, she won the Zimbabwe Achievers Awards, Young Achiever award in the female category.

She also produced and presented Amnesty International – Amnesty Oscar's 2019, BBC Newsbeat – Bride Price on BBC iPlayer, BBC Whats New?, BBC My World, BBC Focus on Africa and BBC Africa Digital.

In 2022 she was nominated for the Global African Awards for Excellence in Journalism.
