= Triangle Country Club Ground =

Triangle Country Club
Ground information
- Location: Triangle, Masvingo, Zimbabwe
- Coordinates: 21.0324°S 31.4475°E
- Establishment: c. 1979

Team information
| Southern Rocks | (2012/13) |
| Zimbabwe-Rhodesia B | (1979/80) |
- As of 25 March 2014; Source: Ground profile

Triangle Country Club is a cricket ground in Triangle, Masvingo, Zimbabwe attached to a larger sporting complex. The first major recorded match was a first-class fixture between Zimbabwe-Rhodesia B and Border in the 1979/80 Castle Bowl, which ended in a draw. For the next thirty-four years the ground held no further major matches, until 2013 when the Southern Rocks were due to play the Mountaineers in a List A match in the 2012/13 Zimbabwe Domestic One-Day Competition, however this match was abandoned. In that same season the Southern Rocks were also due to play a single Twenty20 match there in the Domestic Twenty20 Competition, however this match too was abandoned.

== See also ==
- List of cricket grounds in Zimbabwe
