= Andrew H. Stone =

American judge

Andrew Stone

Personal details
- Born: Pennsylvania, U.S.
- Education: University of Utah (BS, JD)

Andrew Harold Stone is an American judge and lawyer. He is a judge in the Third Judicial District Court of the State of Utah. He was appointed in October 2010 by Governor Gary Herbert.

== Early life ==
Stone was born in Pennsylvania. He spent his childhood in California until the age of fourteen before moving to Utah. He graduated magna cum laude and Phi Beta Kappa from the University of Utah in 1982, with a Bachelor of Science in biology. In 1986, Stone received his Juris Doctor from the University of Utah, where he graduated Order of the Coif.

== Career ==
Stone began his legal career as a law clerk for federal judge Bruce S. Jenkins of the United States District Court for the District of Utah. He subsequently worked for the United States Department of Justice in Washington D.C., with the attorney general's honors program. He worked for the Department of Justice as a trial attorney in the commercial litigation branch from 1987 to 1989.

In 1990, Stone returned to Utah to enter private practice with the Salt Lake City firm Jones, Waldo, Holbrook, and McDonough, where he specialized in antitrust and commercial litigation. In 1998, Stone assisted in the briefing of the Rubin V. Snake River Potato Growers case, which was a companion case that challenged the Line Item Veto Act of 1996. The act was determined by the Supreme Court of the United States to be unconstitutional on June 25, 1998. He assisted in several significant cases involving ERISA and continued his work in antitrust litigation. Stone also represented the United Potato Growers of America, among others, in a multi-district class action lawsuit involving antitrust matters. While with Jones Waldo, Stone served on the law firm's Board of Directors as well as the executive committee before his appointment to the bench.

Stone began his judicial career in January 2011 as a judge in the Third Judicial District Court of the State of Utah, which serves Salt Lake, Tooele, and Summit Counties. In 2017, Stone granted a preliminary injunction in Richards v. Cox, which involved a challenge under the Utah Constitution to a state statute making the state school board a partisan office. He would later be unanimously reversed by the Utah Supreme Court. In 2022, Stone granted a request by Planned Parenthood of Utah to issue a 14-day restraining order blocking enforcement of Utah's trigger law after the U.S. Supreme Court overturned Roe v. Wade.

== Awards ==
Stone was named to Best Lawyers in America for several years for his work with antitrust law. He also received the honor of Legal Elite by Utah Business magazine for his work in business litigation.

== Personal life ==
Stone is married and has two daughters.
