= Sean Ervine =

Zimbabwean cricketer

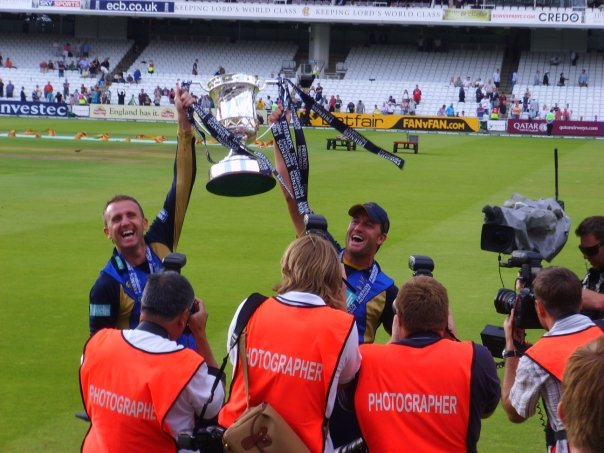
- Sean Ervine (right) and Dominic Cork hold aloft the 2009 Friends Provident Trophy

Personal information
- Full name: Sean Michael Ervine
- Born: 6 December 1982 (age 43); Harare, Zimbabwe
- Nickname: Siuc, Slug
- Height: 6 ft 1 in (1.85 m)
- Batting: Left-handed
- Bowling: Right arm medium
- Role: All-rounder
- Relatives: Craig Ervine (brother)

International information
- National side: Zimbabwe (2001–2004)
- Test debut (cap 57): 22 May 2003 v England
- Last Test: 1 March 2004 v Bangladesh
- ODI debut (cap 67): 10 October 2001 v England
- Last ODI: 14 March 2004 v Bangladesh
- ODI shirt no.: 14

Domestic team information
- Years: Team
- 2001: CFX Academy
- 2001/02–2003/04: Midlands
- 2005–2018: Hampshire (squad no. 7)
- 2006/07–2007/08: Western Australia
- 2009/10: Southern Rocks
- 2010/11: Mountaineers
- 2011/12–2012/13: Matabeleland Tuskers
- 2012–2013: Duronto Rajshahi
- 2013: Brothers Union
- 2014: Partex Sporting Club
- 2017: Quetta Gladiators
- 2018: → Derbyshire (on loan)

Career statistics
Competition	Test	ODI	FC	LA
Matches	5	42	229	251
Runs scored	261	698	11,390	5,716
Batting average	32.62	25.85	36.15	29.92
100s/50s	0/3	1/2	22/57	7/27
Top score	86	100	237*	167*
Balls bowled	570	1,649	20,452	7,564
Wickets	9	41	280	206
Bowling average	43.11	38.07	42.50	34.40
5 wickets in innings	0	0	5	2
10 wickets in match	0	0	0	0
Best bowling	4/146	3/29	6/82	5/50
Catches/stumpings	7/–	5/–	196/–	77/–
- Source: ESPNcricinfo, 2 September 2018

Sean Michael Ervine (born 6 December 1982) is a Zimbabwean former cricketer. Ervine played as an all-rounder who batted left-handed and bowled right-arm medium pace.

Ervine was born at Harare in Zimbabwe and played for his country in the 2003 Cricket World Cup but became one of the cricketers who rebelled against the Zimbabwe Cricket Union, and left the country in May 2004 for a new life in Australia. He subsequently made his way to England, playing for Hampshire County Cricket Club between 2005 and 2018. In September 2018, he retired from all forms of cricket. After retiring from cricket, he took up golf, with the aim to qualify for the MENA Golf Tour. He is currently playing for Minster (Sheppey) Cricket Club.

== Domestic career ==
Ervine originally played for the short-lived CFX Academy team and then Midlands cricket team in Zimbabwe. He made his first-class cricket debut for CFX in the Logan Cup in March 2001.

Ervine was educated at Lomagundi College. After leaving Zimbabwe in 2005 he signed to play for Hampshire County Cricket Club in English county cricket and for Western Australia in Australian domestic cricket. Ervine declared that he would not return to play for the Zimbabwean national team and, following excellent form for Hampshire and Western Australia, Ervine announced that he would seek to qualify for either English or Australian international representation. His time in Australia was less successful and he was unable to hold down a place in the Western Australia team, although he became a regular in county cricket for Hampshire. Once he had committed to no longer playing for Zimbabwe he was able to play county cricket in England as a non-overseas player as he holds an Irish passport. He retired from professional cricket towards the end of the 2018 English cricket season. After finding his opportunities to play limited at Hampshire he had joined Derbyshire on loan but retired after just two matches with the team.

During the 2009 County Championship season, Ervine scored 832 runs at an average of 41.60, making him Hampshire's fourth highest run scorer in the competition. In the 2009 Friends Provident Trophy, Ervine scored his highest List-A score of 167 not out against Ireland. Ervine was later a member of Hampshire's winning squad in the final as they defeated Sussex by six wickets.

Later in his career, Ervine returned to Zimbabwean domestic cricket with the Southern Rocks in 2010 before going on to play for Mountaineers and Matabeleland Tuskers. On debut for Southern Rocks, he made scores of 208 and 160, his two highest innings in first-class cricket at the time. Later the same year, he scored 237 not out against Somerset playing for Hampshire.

== International career ==
Ervine made his debut for Zimbabwe in October 2001 in a One Day International against England. He was a member of the 2003 World Cup squad and ever-present during the England tour later that year. He had begun to show signs of maturing into a genuine international player with his last three Test innings all half centuries, 53 against Australia, and 86 and 74 against Bangladesh.

He played 42 one-day internationals, scoring a total of 698 runs at a batting average of nearly 26 and taking 41 wickets. Arguably his best moment in international cricket came in the 2003–04 VB Series in Australia against India when he scored a century before being run out for 100 during an ultimately unsuccessful run-chase at the Adelaide Oval. Batting with Stuart Carlisle, Ervine contributed to what was Zimbabwe's highest partnership for any wicket in ODIs, putting on 202 runs between them.

Ervine was one of the 15 rebel cricketers in dispute with the Zimbabwe Cricket Union and left the country in 2004. It seemed he might make an unlikely comeback for the country at the 2011 World Cup when he was named in their squad for the tournament, having had some preliminary discussions about the possibility, but later pulled out, reversing his decision due to the financial security that a guaranteed county contract with Hampshire brought.

== Family ==
Ervine's father Rory and uncle Neil both played first-class cricket for Rhodesia B in the 1977/78 Castle Bowl competition and another uncle, Gordon Den, played for Rhodesia and Eastern province in the 1960s. Den's father, Ervine's grandfather, Alexander Den is recorded as having made one appearance for Rhodesia against the touring Australian national team in 1936.

Ervine's brother, Craig is also a Zimbabwean international cricketer who has played Test, ODI and T20I matches for the country. Craig left Zimbabwe for 18 months from late 2013 but, unlike his brother, later made himself available again for the national team. Another brother, Ryan played domestic limited overs cricket in Zimbabwe in 2009/10
