= Nyasha Chari =

Zimbabwean cricketer (born 1980)

Personal information
- Born: 10 October 1980 (age 46); Harare, Zimbabwe
- Source: ESPNcricinfo, 7 December 2016

Nyasha Chari (born 10 October 1980) is a Zimbabwean former cricketer. He played eleven first-class matches between 2000 and 2008.

== Career ==
Chari was introduced to cricket at St Aiden's Primary School by coach Henry Motsi. His impressive all-rounder abilities secured him a scholarship to Prince Edward School. Notable performances during a school tour to England further established his potential.

His cricketing journey includes representing the national Under-15 team, playing for Mashonaland age-group teams, and involvement with clubs such as Old Hararians Sports Club.

Chari's first-class debut with the CFX Academy against Midlands was marked by a wicket with his fourth ball. Having trained at the MRF Pace Foundation under Dennis Lillee, Chari was primarily an in-swing bowler, who was also skilled in front-foot driving and cutting when batting.

Chari, a devout Christian, also attributes his success to his faith.

== See also ==
- CFX Academy cricket team
