= Ryan King (cricketer) =

Zimbabwean cricketer (born 1979)

Personal information
- Born: 6 March 1979 (age 47); Kwekwe, Zimbabwe
- Source: ESPNcricinfo, 7 December 2016

Ryan King (born 6 March 1979) is a Zimbabwean former cricketer. He played sixteen first-class matches between 1998 and 2003.

== Biography ==
King began his career with support from his father, John, a former cricketer. As a student of the 2000 Academy, Ryan had first-class cricket experience, including a stint as CFX Academy team vice-captain. He captained his school team at Whitestone Primary School and later Falcon College. After school, he played two seasons in Australia before returning to Zimbabwe and joining the Matabeleland Logan Cup side and the academy. During his time at the academy, he won the 'Academy Student of the Year' award for 2000.

== See also ==
- CFX Academy cricket team
