= Alester Maregwede =

Zimbabwean cricketer (born 1981)

Personal information
- Full name: Alester Maregwede
- Born: 5 August 1981 (age 45); Harare, Zimbabwe
- Batting: Right-handed
- Role: Wicket-keeper

International information
- National side: Zimbabwe
- Test debut: 6 May 2004 v Sri Lanka
- Last Test: 14 May 2004 v Sri Lanka
- ODI debut: 30 November 2003 v West Indies
- Last ODI: 27 February 2005 v South Africa

Career statistics
Competition	Test	ODI	FC	LA
Matches	2	11	77	87
Runs scored	74	124	2,958	1,470
Batting average	18.50	12.40	22.07	19.34
100s/50s	0/0	0/0	2/18	0/7
Top score	28	37	107	91*
Catches/stumpings	1/–	2/–	142/9	65/6
- Source: ESPNcricinfo, 10 June 2015

Alester Maregwede (born 5 August 1981) is a Zimbabwean cricketer. He is a wicket-keeper and middle-order batsman. He has represented the Zimbabwe A team as vice captain.

He made his first appearances on a West Indies tour in 2003-04 and, since the departure of many Zimbabwean team members, he has found himself playing on a regular basis. He has also represented the Midlands team in the Logan Cup.

Maregwede was born and raised in the Harare suburb of Highfield and first played cricket at Chipembere Primary School. When he was 11 he played his first "proper" match, for Highfield against a High Glen Select XI and he was given the wicketkeeper's gloves for no reason other than that there was no one else to do it. He batted seven, top scoring with 42. Later he was named as captain of Highfield in an inter-suburb tournament which Highfield won. He won a ZCU scholarship to attend Prince Edward School but he ended up at Churchill School because of his need to board.

Whilst he was still in first year he was named captain of a Zimbabwe Development XI for a tour to South Africa. He averaged 64 on the tour and he only lost one game. Because of this tour he started playing for Churchill's full team, as an opener and wicketkeeper. He made his first-class debut for Mashonaland "A" in the Logan Cup versus the full Mashonaland side when he was only 16, scoring 5 and 19.

Maregwede was admitted to the CFX Academy in 2000, missing his final year of school to go. He averaged 41 in the Logan Cup for the academy, with two fifties. Alester has since moved into the full Mashonaland side, with two hundreds and ten fifties.

In the U19 World Cup he scored 64 against Australia. He also played first team rugby and hockey for Churchill and was a sprinter. Alester was a member of the Mildura Settlers Cricket Clubs first premiership in 20 years. Alester has since parted ways with the club.
