= Hillcrest College =

- Hillcrest College Logo

Location
- Kloof Road, Toronto; Mutare; Zimbabwe; 18.923°S 32.645°E

Information
- Type: Independent, day and boarding high school
- Motto: Simba Mate (Shona: From perseverance comes strength)
- Denomination: Interdenominational
- Established: 1985
- Oversight: Hillcrest Schools (Pvt) Ltd
- Principal: Sarah Shoesmith
- Forms: 1–4, Sixth Form
- Gender: Co-educational
- Enrollment: 315 (2020)
- Campus type: Suburban
- Houses: Chimanimani (Maroon), Inyangani (Yellow) and Bvumba (light blue)
- Colours: Navy, White and Grey
- Tuition: US$2,302.00(day); US$2,199.00 (hostel); (Note: Termly fees, the year has 3 terms.)
- Feeder schools: Hillcrest Preparatory School
- Affiliations: ATS; CHISZ
- Website: www.hillcrestschools.co.zw

Hillcrest College (or Hillcrest, also informally referred to as Crest) is an independent, co-educational, boarding and day high school in Mutare, Zimbabwe. The school was established in 1985, two years after the establishment of Hillcrest Preparatory School. Alumni of Hillcrest College are referred to as Old Crestonians.

Hillcrest College is a member of the Association of Trust Schools (ATS) and the Headmistress is a member of the Conference of Heads of Independent Schools in Zimbabwe(CHISZ).

== Academics ==
Hillcrest College offers programs developed by Cambridge International Examinations which include Cambridge Secondary Checkpoint, Cambridge IGCSE, Cambridge International AS/A Level.

== Notable alumni ==
- Jacques Leitao - Zimbabwe Sevens Rugby Captain
- Ozias Bvute - Member of Parliament (2018)
- Tinotenda Mawoyo - Zimbabwe International Cricketer
- Dave Ewers - Exeter Chiefs rugby player

== See also ==
- List of boarding schools
- List of schools in Zimbabwe
