= Justin W. Lewis =

American conductor, cellist and educator (born 1982)

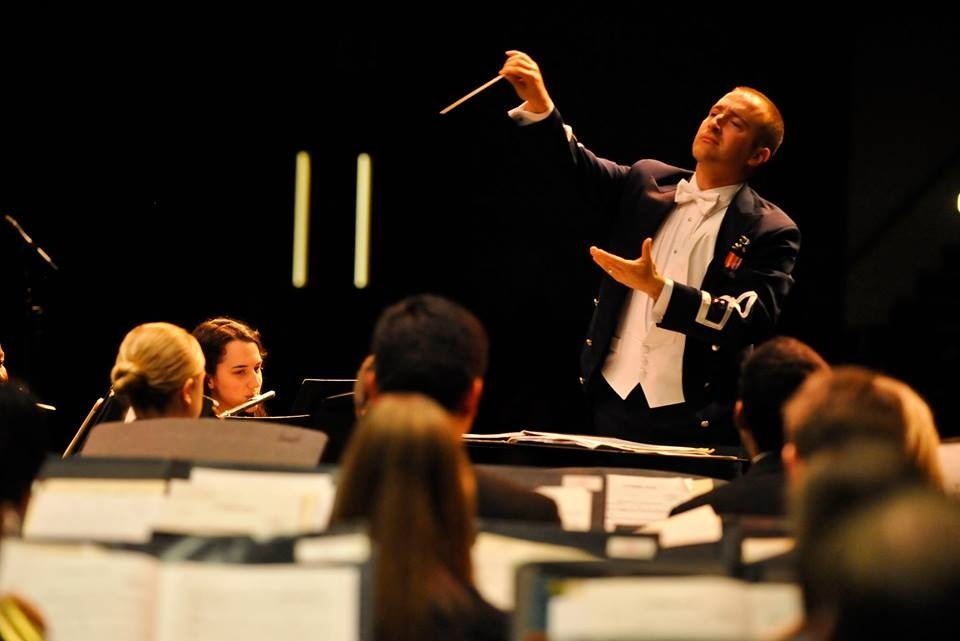
- Lewis leading a joint concert, Air Force Band and College of William and Mary, c. 2014
- Born: Justin Wayne Lewis; 1982 (age 43–44); Lemoyne, Pennsylvania, U.S.
- Education: Temple University (BM); Pennsylvania State University (MM)
- Years active: 2012–present
- Employer: United States Air Force Band

Justin Wayne Lewis (born 1982) is an American arts administrator, conductor, cellist, and educator who became a conductor in the United States Air Force Band program in 2012.

== Biography ==
A native of Lemoyne, Pennsylvania, Lewis graduated from Cedar Cliff High School and served as a Spanish-speaking missionary in the Arizona Tucson Mission of the Church of Jesus Christ of Latter-day Saints (2001–2003). He attended Temple University's Boyer College of Music in Philadelphia, where he graduated summa cum laude with a Bachelor of Music degree (2006) in Cello Performance with a minor in Journalism, Public Relations, and Advertising. While at Temple, he was elected to the "Who's Who Among Students at American Universities and Colleges", while studying with Orlando Cole, Jeffrey Solow, and Philadelphia Orchestra cellist Kathy Picht-Read. Lewis earned a Master of Music degree in Cello Performance (2008), a Pennsylvania K-12 music teaching certificate (choral, band, orchestra, general music) (2009), and Master of Music degree in Orchestral Conducting (2010) from Pennsylvania State University. While at Penn State, Lewis conducted the Penn State Sinfonietta, the largest music ensemble in the school of music, the Penn State Cello Choir and the Penn State Philharmonic. He also taught courses in cello pedagogy, chamber music and repertoire, Lewis completed a doctor of musical arts degree in cello performance with cognate studies in conducting from Catholic University of America's Benjamin T. Rome School of Music. Additionally, he studied conducting at [Codarts] in Rotterdam, Netherlands between 2015 and 2018 with Igor Gruppman.

Lewis commissioned in the United States Air Force as a band officer in 2012. A distinguished graduate of the Air Force Officer Training School, he was awarded the Daniel Webster Award, and the General Daniel "Chappie" James Award for Excellence upon commissioning, and was subsequently stationed at Joint Base Langley Eustis where he became the flight commander of the United States Air Force Heritage of America Band. He attended Defense Information School where he became certified as a Department of Defense spokesperson. In 2013, he led the first Air Force Band/Public Affairs collaborative effort to connect American school children with youth in Kyrgyzstan using music. The effort strengthened U.S. State Department regional objectives by building bonds between the two cultures, and won the first Air Force Public Affairs Director's Communication Excellence Award for Innovation ever given to a band.

In 2015, Lewis was reassigned to the U.S. Air Forces in Europe Band at Ramstein Air Base where he was the flight commander overseeing the ensembles' musical events throughout 105 nation area of responsibility. In 2017, he deployed to Al Udeid Air Base, Qatar where he became the officer in charge of the U.S. Air Forces Central Command Band, a group of active-duty musicians who toured 13 nations in Southwest Asia and parts of Africa as cultural diplomats on behalf of the United States government. In 2018, Lewis was assigned to the Secretary of the Air Force office of Public Affairs where he facilitated opinion leader engagements with senior leaders, city outreach efforts, and VIP visits to the Pentagon reservation. In 2020, Lewis was assigned as commander of the United States Air Force Band of Mid-America at Scott Air Force Base, Illinois.

Lewis formerly served as executive director of the Pennsylvania Suzuki Institute in Hershey, Pennsylvania, and choral director and music department chair at Herbert J. Saunders Middle School in Manassas, Virginia where he also taught orchestra and theory courses, and developed a music therapy curriculum for students with special needs. He has taught music at the Haverford School for Boys in Haverford, Pennsylvania, and the Conservatory of Musical Arts in Haddonfield, NJ. Lewis served at music director of the Washington Temple Orchestra. In 2012, Lewis won an online conducting contest to guest conduct the Mormon Tabernacle Choir and Orchestra at Temple Square. He has appeared with the Pennsylvania Centre Orchestra, the Central Pennsylvania Symphony, the Harrisburg Symphony Orchestra, the Bach Society of Philadelphia, the U.S. Army Training and Doctrine Command Band, Symphony in C, the Wind Ensemble of the College of William and Mary, the Schleswig-Holstein Musik Festival Orchestra, the National Orchestral Institute, La Orquesta Sinfonica de las Americas and the United States Air Force Band and Singing Sergeants among others.

Lewis frequently appeared with the professional men's vocal ensemble Brethren. He regularly guest conducts high school honors music festivals and has appeared at four American Choral Directors Association conferences. He has recorded for the Shadow Mountain and the Centaur labels. With the Capitol String Quartet, he released Walk Beside Me, a recording of LDS primary children songs, for Deseret Book in late 2014. It peaked at #2 on Deseret Book's music charts.

Lewis is married to the American violist Jennifer Jackson Lewis. They have five children.
