= Craig Ervine =

Zimbabwean cricketer

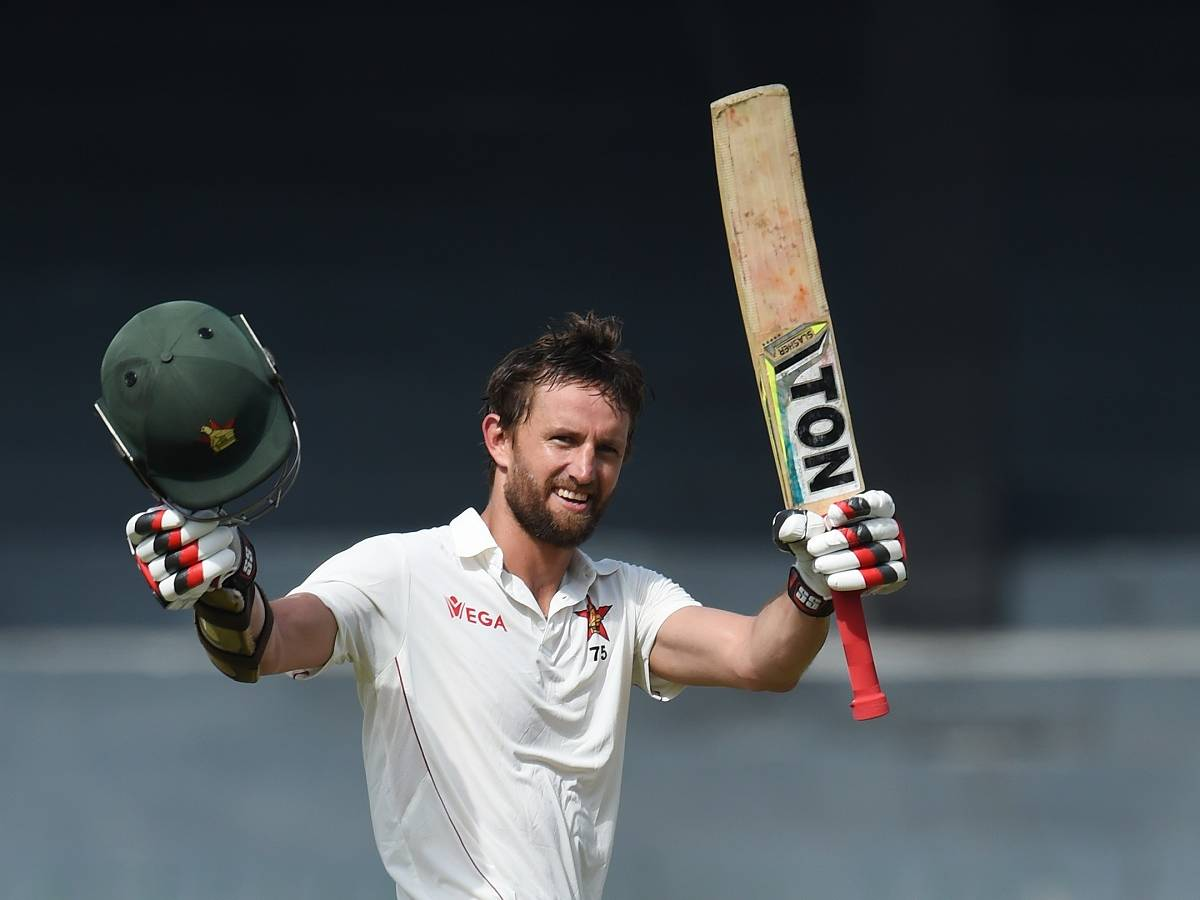

Personal information
- Full name: Craig Richard Ervine
- Born: 19 August 1985 (age 41); Harare, Zimbabwe
- Batting: Left-handed
- Bowling: Right arm off-break
- Role: Middle-order batter
- Relatives: Sean Ervine (brother)

International information
- National side: Zimbabwe (2010–present)
- Test debut (cap 75): 4 August 2011 v Bangladesh
- Last Test: 5 November 2026 v Afghanistan
- ODI debut (cap 109): 28 May 2010 v India
- Last ODI: 17 October 2026 v Bangladesh
- ODI shirt no.: 77
- T20I debut (cap 24): 3 May 2010 v Sri Lanka
- Last T20I: 7 May 2024 v Bangladesh
- T20I shirt no.: 77

Domestic team information
- Years: Team
- 2003/04: Midlands (squad no. 24)
- 2009/10–2010/11: Southern Rocks
- 2011/12–2017/18: Matabeleland Tuskers

Career statistics
Competition	Test	ODI	T20I	FC
Matches	33	135	71	114
Runs scored	2,201	3,863	1,449	8,441
Batting average	36.68	33.30	21.95	44.89
100s/50s	5/8	4/26	0/9	24/37
Top score	206*	130*	70	215
Catches/stumpings	30/–	62/–	31/–	112/–
- Source: ESPNcricinfo, 10 November 2026

Craig Richard Ervine (born 19 August 1985) is a Zimbabwean international cricketer and former captain. Ervine is a left-handed batter. He was born in Harare and has played Test and limited overs cricket for the Zimbabwe national cricket team and first-class cricket for a variety of Zimbabwean teams in the Logan Cup. He holds an Irish passport. In January 2022, in the opening fixture of the series against Sri Lanka, Ervine played in his 100th One Day International (ODI) match.

== Domestic career ==
He soon got a place at Zimbabwe Cricket Academy and soon broke into the domestic set-up playing for Midlands, Zimbabwe U-19s and Zimbabwe A teams.

He made his List A debut during the 2003 Faithwear Clothing Inter-Provincial One-Day Competition playing for Midlands against Matabeleland on 3 December 2003. He made his first-class debut during the 2003–04 Logan Cup playing for Midlands against the Mashonaland on 19 March 2004. He was selected for Zimbabwe squad for the 2004 Under-19 Cricket World Cup.

He also headed to England to work on his techniques and had brief spells at English clubs including Bexhill and Lordswood. He also played for Lisburn Cricket Club in 2009 and 2010. Ervine has played majority of his domestic cricket for Midlands in Zimbabwe.

In February 2010, Ervine signed for the Zimbabwean domestic circuit with Southern Rocks. On debut against the Mid West Rhinos, Ervine made a top score of 100, his first first-class century. He has played for the Matabeleland Tuskers since the 2011/12 season.

In December 2018, during the opening round of the 2018–19 Logan Cup, Ervine scored his tenth century in first-class cricket. He was the leading run-scorer in the 2018–19 Stanbic Bank 20 Series tournament, with 328 runs in six matches. In December 2020, he was selected to play for the Tuskers in the 2020–21 Logan Cup.

== International career ==
=== Early years ===
He was included in Zimbabwe's squad for the 2010 ICC World Twenty20 tournament despite the modest returns in domestic T20 competition and made his T20I debut in a rain-affected group stage match against Sri Lanka on 3 May 2010. He made his ODI debut against India on 28 May 2010 as part of the 2010 Zimbabwe Micromax Tri-Nation Series and scored a half-century on debut. He ended up being unbeaten on 67 runs off just 60 deliveries on debut as Zimbabwe chased down the mammoth 286 runs in a thrilling chase.

He made his test debut against Bangladesh on 4 August 2011 which was also a comeback test appearance for Zimbabwe after their readmission to test cricket. He made an impression on debut with the bat scoring an unbeaten 35 runs in a sixth wicket partnership with Brendan Taylor before Zimbabwe going onto declare at 291/5 and win the match comfortably by 130 runs.

He was named as part of the Zimbabwean squad during the 2011 Cricket World Cup which also marked his maiden appearance in a World Cup tournament. He had a decent World Cup campaign as he ended up as the leading run-scorer for Zimbabwe during the course of the tournament with an aggregate of 231 runs in 6 matches including 3 fifties. He was also a member of the Zimbabwe squad for the 2012 ICC World Twenty20 showpiece. He signed as an overseas player for Lymington in the Southern Premier League for 2012 season.

In 2013, soon after Zimbabwe had returned from the tour of West Indies following the bilateral series, he refused to sign a central Zimbabwe Cricket contract with the intention to pursue his career playing club cricket for Irish club Lisburn and grade cricket for Morley in Western Australia. He moved to Ireland on a passport obtained via his great-great-grandfather in a bid to qualify playing for Ireland cricket team at some point of time. However, it was revealed that his ambitions to represent Ireland was just rumours. He made the move to leave Zimbabwe citing financial insecurity and to earn for a good living in overseas. He also played for Northern Knights in the European summer at the 2013 Inter-Provincial Championship and in the other half of the same year he went to Perth to play club cricket in Australia.

=== International return ===
However, he made a U-turn roughly 18 months later insisting that he once again made his intentions to play for Zimbabwe at international level and made himself available for national selections again in October 2014 ahead of the 2014/15 season. He was in contention for a spot in the national squad for the tour of Bangladesh in 2014 and was included in the main squads. He was thereafter subsequently picked for the 2015 Cricket World Cup which was held in Australia and New Zealand. During the 2015 World Cup, he along with Brendan Taylor put on Zimbabwe's highest fourth wicket partnership of 93 in a World Cup match which came against India.

On 2 August 2015, Ervine scored his first ODI century against New Zealand, an unbeaten 130 runs in a match which Zimbabwe won chasing more than 300 runs. Following the win against New Zealand, his teammate Sean Williams asked him personally to pay half the rent for his stay in the apartment. On 6 August 2016, Ervine scored his maiden Test century, playing against New Zealand at Harare.

On Zimbabwe's 2017 tour of Sri Lanka, Ervine scored a match winning 69 runs to level the five-match series 2–2. Zimbabwe won the 5th ODI and won the first ever series against Sri Lanka as well. Ervine's second test century came against Sri Lanka on 14 July 2017 at the R Premadasa Stadium and registered his career best test knock of 160. Despite his valiant efforts with the bat, Sri Lanka went onto win the closely fought test match after successfully chasing down the mammoth target of 391.

He was included in Zimbabwe's squad for the 2018 Cricket World Cup Qualifier tournament which was held in Zimbabwe.

On 14 July 2019, he involved in an unbroken runstand worth of 111 runs along with Sean Williams for the third wicket during the third and decisive T20I against Ireland and it is also the highest ever partnership for Zimbabwe in terms of runs in T20I cricket. Zimbabwe chased down the target of 172 runs to square the three match T20I series against Ireland 1–1.

In January 2020, during the first Test against Sri Lanka, Ervine scored his 1,000th run in Test cricket.

=== Captaincy ===
On 22 February 2020, he captained Test team in the one-off Test against Bangladesh, after Sean Williams, Zimbabwe's regular Test captain, took leave ahead of the match for the birth of his first child. He scored a century top scoring for Zimbabwe in first innings with 107 and despite his valiant effort with the bat in both innings of the match on his captaincy debut, Zimbabwe went onto lose by an innings and 106 runs.

In August 2021, he was appointed as white ball captain of Zimbabwe for the first time and assumed white ball captaincy for the first time during the limited overs series against Ireland and the T20I series against Scotland. He was reinstated as the captain of Zimbabwe team for the three match ODI series against Sri Lanka in January 2022.

== Education ==
Ervine studied for A-levels at Lomagundi College.

== Personal life ==
Ervine's father Rory and uncle Neil both played first-class cricket for Rhodesia B in the 1977/78 Castle Bowl competition and another uncle, Gordon Den, played for Rhodesia and Eastern province in the 1960s. Den's father, Ervine's grandfather, Alexander Den is recorded as having made one appearance for Rhodesia against the touring Australian national team in 1936. He along with his brothers Sean and Ryan were brought and raised up in a farm outside Harare and he inherited interest in cricket through his grandparents who would even pay 50 cents to anyone who took a wicket.

Ervine's brother, Sean Ervine also played for Zimbabwe and, after leaving the country in 2004, forged a successful career in English county cricket with Hampshire. Another brother Ryan played domestic limited overs cricket in Zimbabwe in 2009/10 season.

Ervine almost had a hand amputated in his early teens following a freak accident where he slipped and fell on broken glass in his family's living room. He slipped on some stray penlight batteries at home. His mum who was a nurse during wartime immediately helped her son from excessive bleeding. The injury required a three-hour reconstructive operation to his right hand.
