= Clement Mahachi =

Zimbabwean cricketer (born 1979)

Personal information
- Born: 27 September 1979 (age 47); Bulawayo, Zimbabwe
- Batting: Left-handed
- Bowling: Left-arm medium
- Source: ESPNcricinfo, 7 December 2016

Clement Mahachi (born 27 September 1979) is a Zimbabwean former cricketer. He played nine first-class matches between 1999 and 2002.

== Biography ==
Coming from a family primarily interested in soccer, Mahachi had no familial ties to cricket. His introduction to the sport happened around age ten or eleven at a primary school in Bulawayo townships, part of Zimbabwe Cricket Union's development scheme. He later attended Bulawayo Academy.

Despite his initial focus on soccer, Mahachi showed promise in both batting and bowling, leading his friend to encourage him to participate in the cricket sessions run by Nicholas Sisingo. In his debut match against the Rhodes Estate Primary School team, Mahachi was the top scorer for his team and also took four wickets.

Unfortunately, lack of a scholarship scheme for a cricket-playing high school in Bulawayo meant Mahachi had no school cricket opportunities. However, he joined Bulawayo Athletic Club (BAC), scoring 133 against a team from Sunrise in Form One. It was only during the 1998/99 season that Mahachi joined the BAC first team. He successfully captained the local development team to two league titles and averaged 51 runs in the 1997/98 season.

Former New Zealand cricketer and coach Bob Blair played a significant role in helping him secure a place on the Matabeleland Under-19 team despite the absence of school cricket. Though he was part of the Matabeleland team and an invitee for the national Under-19 World Cup trials, he was unable to fully showcase his skills. He also found out he was over-aged and could not qualify for the World Cup team.

In 1999, playing for Bulawayo Athletic Club, Clement delivered strong performances with several fifties and regular wickets, his highest score being 70 against Bulawayo Sports Club. His potential led him to be recommended for the Academy by the Matabeleland Board and impressed players such as John Rennie.

During his time at the Academy and in the Logan Cup, Mahachi played as an all-rounder. He admitted to initially lacking batting confidence, which may have resulted in a low position in the order. While he typically opened in Bulawayo club cricket, he aimed for the sixth position in the Academy side.

Mahachi spent the 2000 English season playing for Brook Cricket Club in Surrey. However, due to a calf injury mid-season he switched to spin bowling.

After his year at the Academy, he had a successful stint with Old Hararians in the Vigne Cup. Later, he played for MacDonald Club. During his final contract year with the Zimbabwe Cricket Union, he moved to Bulawayo Sports Club and scored 101 not out in the first match. However, a back injury caused him to miss early parts of Logan Cup programme.

Mahachi credits Blair and Carl Rackemann for developing his bowling skills.
