= Keegan Meth =

Zimbabwean cricketer (born 1988)

Personal information
- Full name: Keegan Orry Meth
- Born: 8 February 1988 (age 38); Bulawayo, Zimbabwe
- Batting: Right-handed
- Bowling: Right-arm medium-fast
- Role: All-rounder

International information
- National side: Zimbabwe
- Test debut: 17 April 2013 v Bangladesh
- Last Test: 29 April 2013 v Bangladesh
- ODI debut: 25 February 2006 v New Zealand
- Last ODI: 3 February 2012 v New Zealand
- ODI shirt no.: 11

Domestic team information
- Years: Team
- 2008: Westerns
- 2009/10–2012/13: Matabeleland Tuskers

Career statistics
Competition	Test	ODI	T20I	FC
Matches	2	11	2	32
Runs scored	72	106	6	1,029
Batting average	24.00	13.25	6.00	24.50
100s/50s	0/0	0/1	0/0	0/5
Top score	31*	53	6*	94
Balls bowled	324	406	42	5,234
Wickets	4	6	0	128
Bowling average	24.50	69.83	–	17.14
5 wickets in innings	0	0	–	10
10 wickets in match	0	0	–	2
Best bowling	2/41	2/52	–	7/42
Catches/stumpings	0/–	1/–	1/–	12/–
- Source: Cricinfo, 8 May 2013

Keegan Orry Meth (born 8 February 1988) is a former Zimbabwean cricketer. He played domestically for the Matabeleland Tuskers and represented Zimbabwe in international cricket. An all-rounder, he bowled right-arm medium-fast and generally batted in the lower middle order.

== Early life and education ==
Meth attended Whitestone School, Falcon College, St Georges College Harare and subsequently Christian Brothers College.

== Career ==
He made his debut for Zimbabwe in 2006, in a One Day International (ODI) against Kenya at Bulawayo. He was aged 18 at the time.

He lost three teeth, suffered a broken jaw, and lacerations to his lip when he was struck by a ball hit by Nasir Hossain off his own bowling while playing in the last ODI of the UCB Cup on 21 August 2011 against Bangladesh.

Meth made his Test debut against Bangladesh in 2013 along with Richmond Mutumbami and Timycen Maruma. He finished with match figures of 2/57 (32 overs) and made a total of 52 runs in the match with a highest score of 31 not out.

Meth retired from international cricket in 2013 when he was 25 years old.
