= Lomagundi College =

- Lomagundi College Logo

Location
- Old Strip Road; Chinhoyi, Mashonaland West; Zimbabwe
- Coordinates: 17.3264°S 30.1410°E

Information
- Type: Independent, boarding and day school
- Motto: Tabatana (Shona: We are one)
- Opened: 14 February 1983
- Headmaster: Dean Seeliger
- Teaching staff: 42
- Forms: 1–4, Sixth Form
- Gender: Co-educational
- Enrollment: 335 (2016)
- Language: English
- Houses: 4
- Colours: Green and yellow
- Tuition: US$2,670.00 (day); US$4,500.00 (boarding); (Note: Termly fees, the year has 3 terms.)
- Feeder schools: Lomagundi College Primary School
- Affiliations: ATS; CHISZ
- Website: college.lomagundi.com

Lomagundi College (or simply Lomagundi) is an independent, co-educational, boarding and day, senior school in Zimbabwe which is situated about 130 km northwest of the capital Harare along the Harare-Chirundu highway on the outskirts of Chinhoyi (formerly known as Sinoia) the provincial capital of Mashonaland West.

Lomagundi College was ranked as one of the Top 10 High Schools in Zimbabwe in 2014.

Lomagundi College is a member of the Association of Trust Schools (ATS) and the Headmaster is a member of the Conference of Heads of Independent Schools in Zimbabwe (CHISZ).

== History ==
Lomagundi College was opened in 1983. The school was built in a valley, over an abandoned coal mine named Chigwizi.

The senior school boarding hostels were named after areas around Zimbabwe, namely Sebakwe, Mana (the two boys hostels) with Vumba and Charara being the girls hostels.

== Notable alumni ==
Lomagundi has produced some great sportsmen and women over the decades.

- Greg Lamb - Cricketer
- Sean Ervine - Cricketer
- Brendan Taylor - Cricketer
- Tongayi Chirisa - Actor
- Craig Ervine - Cricket
- Tsungai Muswerakuenda - Miss Universe Zimbabwe

== See also ==
- List of schools in Zimbabwe
- List of boarding schools
