= 2023–24 Logan Cup =

Cricket tournament

- Dates: 6 December 2023 – 18 February 2024
- Administrator: Zimbabwe Cricket
- Cricket format: First-class cricket (4 days)
- Tournament format: Double round-robin
- Champions: Mountaineers (5th title)
- Participants: 5
- Matches: 20
- Most runs: Brian Chari (692)
- Most wickets: Alex Russell (37)

The 2023–24 Logan Cup was the 30th edition of the Logan Cup, a first-class cricket competition in Zimbabwe, which started on 6 December 2023. The tournament included twenty matches, eight games per team and the tournament concluded on 18 February 2024. The Mashonaland Eagles were the defending champions. The Mountaineers clinched victory in the tournament with a final-round triumph, defeating the defending champions, the Eagles, by an innings and 123 runs. This win propelled them to the top of the table, surpassing the Rocks who were on their bye week.

== Points table ==
| Team | Pld | W | L | D | Ab | Pts |
|---|---|---|---|---|---|---|
| Mountaineers | 8 | 4 | 1 | 1 | 2 | 130 |
| Southern Rocks | 8 | 3 | 1 | 3 | 1 | 122 |
| Matabeleland Tuskers | 8 | 2 | 3 | 3 | 0 | 107 |
| Mashonaland Eagles | 8 | 1 | 2 | 5 | 0 | 104 |
| Mid West Rhinos | 8 | 1 | 4 | 2 | 1 | 84 |

Champions.

- 10 points for a win, 6 for a tie, 5 for a draw, 0 for a loss. An extra 2 points are awarded for an innings victory.
- Batting bonus points: 1 point each for reaching 200, 250, 300, and 350 runs in each innings.
- Bowling bonus points: 1 point each for taking 3, 5, 7, and 9 wickets in each innings

=== Match Summary ===
The total team points at the end of each round are listed.

| Team | Round | | | | | | | | | | Total |
| Team | 1 | 2 | 3 | 4 | 5 | 6 | 7 | 8 | 9 | 10 | Total |
|---|---|---|---|---|---|---|---|---|---|---|---|
| Mountaineers | 24 | 24 | 29 | 50 | 68 | 97 | 97 | 97 | 106 | 130 | 130 |
| Southern Rocks | 12 | 33 | 39 | 57 | 57 | 62 | 84 | 100 | 122 | 122 | 122 |
| Matabeleland Tuskers | 15 | 23 | 23 | 32 | 37 | 44 | 44 | 59 | 84 | 107 | 107 |
| Mashonaland Eagles | 11 | 20 | 35 | 35 | 54 | 68 | 77 | 97 | 97 | 104 | 104 |
| Mid West Rhinos | 0 | 10 | 15 | 29 | 53 | 53 | 60 | 68 | 77 | 84 | 84 |

| Win | Loss | Draw | Abandoned | Bye |

== Fixtures ==
=== Round 1 ===
6–9 December 2023
Scorecard

| Tuskers | v | Eagles |
| 503/8d (155.3 overs); Brian Chari 155 (280); Alex Russell 3/139 (33.3 overs) | | 232 (70.4 overs); Tinashe Kamunhukamwe 132 (129); Ainsley Ndlovu 4/41 (21.4 overs) |
| 311/5 (130 overs); Mathew Welch 90 (165); Mamoon Ur Riaz] 1/20 (17.1 overs) |

Match drawn
Harare Sports Club, Harare
Umpires: Stanley Gogwe and Tafadzwa Musakwa
Player of the match: Ainsley Ndlovu (Tuskers)

- Tuskers won the toss and elected to bat.
- Hamza Sajjad (Eagles), Mathew Welch (Eagles) and Mamoon Ur Riaz (Tuskers) made their first-class debuts.
- Tinashe Kamunhukamwe (Eagles) scored his maiden first-class century.
- Points: Tuskers 15, Eagles 11

6–9 December 2023
Scorecard

| Mountaineers | v | Rocks |
| 400 (88.5 overs); Wellington Masakadza 88 (75); Dom Bess 5/99 (28.5 overs) | | 405/9d (101 overs); Johnathan Campbell 106 (134); Tendai Chatara 4/52 (22 overs) |
| 255 (47.5 overs); Salman Mirza 46 (39); Privilege Chesa 4/41 (8.5 overs) | | 81 (25.4 overs); Innocent Kaia 22 (32); Salman Mirza 4/60 (12.4 overs) |

Mountaineers won by 169 runs
Old Hararians, Harare
Umpires: Sifelani Rwaziyeni and David Shawane

- Rocks won the toss and elected to field.
- Jalat Khan (Rocks), Salman Mirza and Tariro Makauyo (Mountaineers) all made their first-class debuts.
- Johnathan Campbell (Rocks) scored his maiden first-class century.
- Points: Mountaineers 24, Rocks 12

=== Round 2 ===
13–16 December 2023
Scorecard

| Eagles | v | Rhinos |
| 86 (35.4 overs); Romario Roach 30 (62); Muhammad Adil 5/31 (13 overs) | | 206/9d (62.5 overs); Patrick Rowe 55 (127); Alex Falao 3/25 (9 overs) |
| 27/0 (5 overs); Mathew Welch 14* (13) |

Match drawn
Takashinga Cricket Club, Harare
Umpires: Ashby Mutumbami and Christopher Pheri
Player of the match: Muhammad Adil (Rhinos)

- Eagles won the toss and elected to bat.
- Only 8.3 overs were played on day 1 due to rain.
- Only 11.4 overs were played on day 2 due to rain.
- Only 24.4 overs were played on day 3 due to rain.
- Romario Roach (Eagles), Muhammad Adil and Wallace Mubayiwa (Rhinos) all made their first-class debuts.
- Points: Eagles 9, Rhinos 10

13–16 December 2023
Scorecard

| Rocks | v | Tuskers |
| 285 (82.3 overs); Dom Bess 63 (86); Brandon James 4/39 (12.3 Overs) | | 200 (59.3 overs); Brian Chari 62 (78); Cuthbert Musoko 4/32 (11 overs) |
| 236/7d (62.1 overs); Dom Bess 56 (84); Ernest Masuku 4/50 (12.1 overs) | | 71 (24.3 overs); Awad Naqvi 19* (59); Jalat Khan 5/14 (8 overs) |

Rocks won by 250 runs
Old Hararians, Harare
Umpires: Stanley Gogwe and Oscar Tafirenyika
Player of the match: Dom Bess (Rocks)

- Tuskers won the toss and elected to field.
- Only 13 overs were played on day 1 due to rain.
- Day 2 ended after 70.2 overs played due to rain.
- Only 23.1 overs were played on day 3 due to rain.
- Adrian Mupembe and Brandon James (Tuskers) both made their first-class debut.
- Points: Rocks 21, Tuskers 8

=== Round 3 ===
20–23 December
Scorecard

| Rocks | v | Eagles |
| 76 (23.3 overs); William Mashinge 24* (37); Faraz Akram 4/23 (10 overs) | | 348/3d (70.2 overs); Tinashe Kamunhukamwe 159 (183); Alistair Frost 3/26 (7.1 overs) |
| 80/5 (32.4 overs); Alistair Frost 36* (90); Hamza Sajjad 2/18 (7.4 overs) |

Match drawn
Harare Sports Club, Harare
Umpires: Langton Rusere and Sifelani Rwaziyeni
Player of the match: Tinashe Kamunhukamwe (Eagles)

- Rocks won the toss and elected to bat.
- Day 1 ended after 35.3 overs played due to rai
- No play was possible on day 3 due to rain and wet outfield.
- Mathew Welch (Eagles) scored his maiden first-class century.
- Alvin Chiradza replaced Johnathan Campbell as concussion substitute for Rocks.
- Points: Eagles 15, Rocks 6

20–23 December
Scorecard

| Mountaineers | v | Rhinos |

No result
Old Hararians, Harare
Umpires: Christopher Phiri and David Shawane

- No toss
- No play was possible on day 1 due to rain and wet outfield.
- No play was possible on day 2 due to rain and wet outfield.
- No play was possible on day 3 due to rain and wet outfield.
- No play was possible on day 4 due to rain and wet outfield.
- Points: Mountaineers 5, Rhinos 5

=== Round 4 ===
3–6 January
Scorecard

| Rocks | v | Rhinos |
| 458 (102.3 overs); Johnathan Campbell 194 (248); Michael Chinouya 4/70 (19 overs) | | 448 (101.4 overs); Nyasha Mayavo 101 (85); Jalat Khan 3/86 (24 overs) |
| 324/4 (69.5 overs); Johnathan Campbell 139 (176); Muhammad Ali 3/93 (14.5 overs) | | 160/6 (52.1 overs); Prince Masvaure 67* (157); Jalat Khan 4/66 (20 overs) |

Match drawn
Harare Sports Club, Harare
Umpires: Christopher Phiri and Sifelani Rwaziyeni

- Rhinos won the toss and elected to field.
- Points: Rocks 18, Rhinos 14.

3–6 January
Scorecard

| Mountaineers | v | Tuskers |
| 187 (32 overs); Peter Moor 56 (28); Mamoon Ur Riaz 5/55 (14 overs) | | 210 (81.2 overs); Dalubhle Mboyi 48 (134); Salman Mirza 6/42 (18 overs) |
| 320 (93.4 overs); Dion Myers 156 (270); Mamoon Ur Riaz 4/93 (21 overs) | | 121/9 (42 overs); Tanunurwa Makoni 41 (86); Salman Mirza 3/46 (11 overs) |

Mountaineers won by 176 runs
Old Hararians, Harare
Umpires: Iknow Chabi and Stanley Gogwe

- Tuskers won the toss and elected to field.
- Points: Mountaineers 21, Tuskers 9.

=== Round 5 ===
10–13 January
Scorecard

| Mountaineers | v | Eagles |
| 237 (44.5 overs); Salman Mirza 64 (50); Alex Russell 6/72 (14 overs) | | 336 (82 overs); Tadiwanashe Marumani 78 (118); Tendai Chatara 4/95 (20 overs) |
| 578/8d (98 overs); Dion Myers 204* (270); Alex Russell 4/192 (29 overs) | | 443/9 (94.3 overs); Tadiwanashe Marumani 144* (141); Victor Nyauchi 3/62 (16 overs) |

Match drawn
Harare Sports Club, Harare
Umpires: Ashby Mutumbami and Percival Sizara

- Eagles won the toss and elected to field.
- Points: Mountaineers 18, Mashonaland Eagles 19

10–13 January
Scorecard

| Tuskers | v | Rhinos |
| 128 (42.1 overs); Sean Williams 37 (24); Michael Chinouya 5/31 (10 overs) | | 538/3d (126.4 overs); Antum Naqvi 300* (295); Nkosana Mpofu 1/66 (20 overs) |
| 370 (136 overs); Hamid Ali 124* (147); Michael Chinouya 5/66 (23 overs) |

Rhinos won by an innings and 40 runs
Old Hararians, Harare
Umpires: Iknow Chabi and Tafadzwa Musakwa

- Rhinos won the toss and elected to field.
- Nkosibongwe Gogodo (Tuskers) made his first-class debut.
- Antum Naqvi became the first batter ever to record a triple-century for any Zimbabwean team.
- Points: Mid West Rhinos 24, Matabeleland Tuskers 5

=== Round 6 ===
17–20 January
Scorecard

| Tuskers | v | Eagles |
| 122 (42.4 overs); Adrian Mupembe 26 (22); Alex Russell 5/38 (8.4 overs) | | 205/6d (45.2 overs); Kudzai Maunze 56 (90); Tinotenda Maposa 4/85 (16.2 overs) |
| 197 (62 overs); Brian Chari 66 (118); Alex Russell 7/84 (23 overs) | | 14/0 (1.4 overs) |

Match drawn
Harare Sports Club, Harare
Umpires: Oscar Tafirenyika & Percival Sizara

- Mashonaland Eagles elected to field first
- No play was possible on Day 3 due to rain and wet outfield
- Points: Matabeleland Tuskers 7, Mashonaland Eagles 14

17–20 January
Scorecard

| Mountaineers | v | Rocks |

Match abandoned without a ball bowled
Old Hararians, Harare
Umpires: Christopher Phiri & Stanley Gogwe

- No toss
- No play was possible on day 1 due to rain and wet outfield.
- No play was possible on day 2 due to rain and wet outfield.
- No play was possible on day 3 due to rain and wet outfield.
- No play was possible on day 4 due to rain and wet outfield.
- Points: Mountaineers 5, Southern Rocks 5

=== Round 7 ===
24–27 January
Scorecard

| Eagles | v | Rocks |
| 445/9d (99.5 overs); Tadiwanashe Marumani 163 (155); Cuthbert Musoko 5/84 (14 overs) | | 468 (107.4 overs); Richmond Mutumbami 112 (154); Tapiwa Mufudza 3/85 (25.4 overs) |
| 162 (40.4 overs); Tinashe Kamunhukamwe 65 (64); Tendai Chisoro 6/43 (18 overs) | | 143/3 (23.5 overs); Roy Kaia 46 (44); Faraz Akram 1/25 (6 overs) |

Rocks won by 7 wickets
Takashinga Cricket Club, Harare
Umpires: Collin Tlou and Sifelani Rwaziyeni

- Mashonaland Eagles elected to bat
- Points: Southern Rocks 22, Mashonaland Eagles 9

24–27 January
Scorecard

| Mountaineers | v | Rhinos |
| 253 (59 overs); Brian Bennett 60 (85); Prince Masvaure 4/28 (11 overs) | | 219 (62.1 overs); Ben Curran 99 (184); Wellington Masakadza 4/38 (15.1 overs) |
| 431/6d (113 overs); PJ Moor 130 (145); Prince Masvaure 3/79 (29 overs) | | 110 (41.5 overs); Ben Curran 29 (62); Wellington Masakadza 5/20 (7.5 overs) |

Mountaineers won by 355 runs
Kwekwe Sports Club, Kwekwe
Umpires: David Shawane & Stanley Gogwe

- Mountaineers elected to bat
- Tony Munyonga scored his maiden first-class century.
- Points: Mountaineers 24, Mid West Rhinos 7

=== Round 8 ===
1–4 February
Scorecard

| Eagles | v | Rhinos |
| 252/9d (50.4 overs); Craig Ervine 103 (117); Neville Madziva 4/39 (11 overs) | | 152 (52.5 overs); Nyasha Mayavo 43 (61); Tapiwa Mufudza 6/41 (16.5 overs) |
| 116 (31.5 overs); Chamu Chibhabha 23 (27); Muhammad Adil 3/44 (12 overs) | | 181 (56 overs); Remembrance Nyathi 55 (112); Tapiwa Mufudza 4/51 (27 overs) |

Eagles won by 35 runs
Takashinga Cricket Club, Harare
Umpires: Oscar Tafirenyika and Percival Sizara

- Mid West Rhinos elected to field first
- Points: Mashonaland Eagles 20, Mid West Rhinos 8

1–4 February
Scorecard

| Tuskers | v | Rocks |
| 500/9d (150 overs); Hamid Ali 130 (214); Johnathan Campbell 3/64 (22 overs) | | 408 (106.1 overs); Eddie Byrom 87 (90); Ernest Masuku 3/51 (15 overs) |
| 287/7 (85 overs); Nkosana Mpofu 88 (128); Tendai Chisoro 3/98 (27 overs) |

Match Drawn
Queens Sports Club, Bulawayo
Umpires: Christopher Phiri and Iknow Chabi

- Southern Rocks elected to field
- Points: Matabeleland Tuskers 15, Southern Rocks 16

=== Round 9 ===
8–11 February
Scorecard

| Tuskers | v | Mountaineers |
| 394 (97.4 overs); Hamid Ali 122 (193); Tendai Chatara 5/93 (19.4 overs) | | 272 (76.3 overs); Donald Tiripano 129* (156); Luke Jongwe 3/30 (11.2 overs) |
| 340/8d (93 overs); Samiullah 77 (169); Wellington Masakadza 4/121 (32 overs) | | 175 (48 overs); Spencer Magodo 52 (65); Mamoon Ur Riaz 4/51 (17 overs) |

Tuskers won by 287 runs
Takashinga Cricket Club, Harare
Umpires: Iknow Chabi and Nkosehle Ndiweni

- Mountaineers elected to field
- Points: Matabeleland Tuskers 25, Mountaineers 9

8–11 February
Scorecard

| Rhinos | v | Rocks |
| 316 (94 overs); Bright Matsiwe 88 (166); Johnathan Campbell 4/62 (19 overs) | | 417 (92 overs); Johnathan Campbell 116 (146); Michael Chinouya 3/59 (14 overs) |
| 239 (67.5 overs); Tarisai Musakanda 66 (83); Jalat Khan 6/70 (16.5 overs) | | 139/4 (28.5 overs); Roy Kaia 80* (87); Jabulisa Tshuma 2/48 (9 overs) |

Rocks won by 6 wickets
Old Hararians, Harare
Umpires: Ashby Mutumbami and Christopher Phiri

- Southern Rocks elected to field
- Points: Southern Rocks 22, Mid West Rhinos 9

=== Round 10 ===
15–18 February
Scorecard

| Eagles | v | Mountaineers |
| 631/7d (108 overs); Brian Bennett 264* (259); Hamza Sajjad 3/84 (21 overs) | | 302 (69.2 overs); Mathew Welch 116 (162); Tendai Chatara 3/71 (14 overs) |
| 206 (36.5 overs) (f/o); Romario Roach 50* (33); Tendai Chatara 4/48 (8 overs) |

Mountaineers won by an innings and 123 runs
Old Hararians, Harare
Umpires: Langton Rusere and Sarah Dambanevana

- Mashonaland Eagles elected to field
- Points: Mountaineers 24, Mashonaland Eagles 7

15–18 February
Scorecard

| Rhinos | v | Tuskers |
| 591 (141.2 overs); Brian Chari 213 (321); Tafara Chingwara 3/76 (22 overs) | | 137 (32.5 overs); Carl Mumba 34 (28); Ernest Masuku 5/46 (10 overs) |
| 233/7d (59.5 overs); Nkosana Mpofu 89 (150); Victor Chirwa 5/83 (27 overs) | | 177 (63.1 overs); Ben Curran 61 (111); Ainsley Ndlovu 6/19 (11.1 overs) |

Tuskers won by 510 runs
Harare Sports Club, Harare
Umpires: Forster Mutizwa and Percival Sizara

- Mid West Rhinos elected to field
- Points: Matabeleland Tuskers 23, Mid West Rhinos 7

== Statistics ==
=== Most Runs ===
| Player | Team | Mat | Inns | Runs | Ave | SR | HS | 100 | 50 | 4s | 6s |
|---|---|---|---|---|---|---|---|---|---|---|---|
| Brian Chari | Matabeleland Tuskers | 8 | 14 | 692 | 49.42 | 56.12 | 213 | 2 | 4 | 70 | 10 |
| Johnathan Campbell | Southern Rocks | 7 | 13 | 675 | 61.36 | 75.08 | 194 | 4 | - | 66 | 8 |
| Hamid Ali | Matabeleland Tuskers | 8 | 15 | 674 | 48.14 | 65.5 | 130 | 3 | 1 | 70 | 4 |
| Tadiwanashe Marumani | Mashonaland Eagles | 7 | 11 | 630 | 70 | 91.3 | 163 | 2 | 3 | 75 | 13 |
| Nkosana Mpofu | Matabeleland Tuskers | 8 | 15 | 623 | 41.53 | 48.25 | 162 | 2 | 3 | 79 | 4 |
Source: ESPNCricInfo

=== Most Wickets ===
| Player | Team | Mat | Inns | Wkts | BBI | Avg | Econ | SR | 5w | 10w |
|---|---|---|---|---|---|---|---|---|---|---|
| Alex Russell | Mashonaland Eagles | 8 | 12 | 37 | 7/84 | 30.97 | 4.98 | 37.27 | 3 | 2 |
| Salman Mirza | Mountaineers | 6 | 12 | 31 | 6/42 | 21.54 | 3.77 | 34.25 | 1 | 0 |
| Jalat Khan | Southern Rocks | 7 | 13 | 30 | 6/70 | 24.33 | 4.02 | 36.3 | 2 | 0 |
| Tendai Chatara | Mountaineers | 6 | 12 | 29 | 5/93 | 19.55 | 3.31 | 35.37 | 1 | 0 |
| Hamza Sajjad | Mashonaland Eagles | 8 | 13 | 25 | 4/24 | 21.26 | 3.30 | 39.52 | 0 | 0 |
Source: ESPNCricInfo

== Awards ==
On March 7, 2024, at the end of the season, the following awards were made.

| Award | Recipient | Prize money |
|---|---|---|
| Champions | Mountaineers | US$7,000 |
| Runners-up | Southern Rocks | US$5,000 |
| Batter of the Tournament | Johnathan Campbell | US$1,000 |
| Bowler of the Tournament | Alex Russell | US$1,000 |
| Player of The Tournament | Brian Chari | US$2,000 |
