= 2018–19 Logan Cup =

Cricket tournament

- Dates: 3 December 2018 – 16 February 2019
- Administrator(s): Zimbabwe Cricket
- Cricket format: First-class cricket (4 days)
- Tournament format(s): League system
- Champions: Mountaineers (4th title)
- Participants: 4
- Matches: 12
- Most runs: Timycen Maruma (409)
- Most wickets: Donald Tiripano (25)

The 2018–19 Logan Cup was the 25th edition of the Logan Cup, a first-class cricket competition in Zimbabwe, that started on 3 December 2018. The tournament featured four teams, instead of the five that took part in the previous edition, with the Rising Stars being disbanded. The other change to the 2018–19 tournament was that it was being played across six rounds, instead of ten, as per previous years. Mountaineers were the defending champions.

In January 2019, the matches in the third round of fixtures were both called off, following fuel protests taking place in the country. In February 2019, Mountaineers retained their title, with a match left to play, after they beat Mashonaland Eagles by ten wickets. It was their third consecutive title.

== Point table ==
The following teams competed:

Team	Pld	W	L	D	A	Pts
Mountaineers	6	4	1	1	0	45
Mid West Rhinos	6	2	2	2	0	29
Mashonaland Eagles	6	2	2	2	0	26
Matabeleland Tuskers	6	0	3	3	0	16

Champions

== Fixtures ==
=== Round 1 ===
3–6 December 2018
Scorecard

Matabeleland Tuskers	v	Mashonaland Eagles
313 (113.2 overs); Craig Ervine 141 (214); Tinotenda Mutombodzi 3/19 (9.2 overs)		284 (73.2 overs); Cephas Zhuwao 60 (45); John Nyumbu 2/28 (9.2 overs)
181 (73.5 overs); Cunningham Ncube 77 (160); Chamu Chibhabha 3/19 (8 overs)		155/4 (32 overs); Richmond Mutumbami 33 (57); John Nyumbu 1/14 (5 overs)

Match drawn
Harare Sports Club, Harare
Umpires: Sifelani Rwaziyeni and Walter Musakwa

- Mashonaland Eagles won the toss and elected to field.
- Craig Ervine (Matabeleland Tuskers) scored his tenth century in first-class cricket.

3–6 December 2018
Scorecard

Mid West Rhinos	v	Mountaineers
232 (60.1 overs); Tarisai Musakanda 119 (167); Victor Nyauchi 3/38 (12 overs)		153 (58.3 overs); Roy Kaia 39 (91); Neville Madziva 3/21 (11 overs)
165 (46.5 overs); Peter Moor 50 (88); Donald Tiripano 5/42 (16 overs)		140 (48.4 overs); Donald Tiripano 31 (61); Carl Mumba 6/7 (8.4 overs)

Mid West Rhinos won by 104 runs
Kwekwe Sports Club, Kwekwe
Umpires: Stanley Gogwe and Iknow Chabi

- Mid West Rhinos won the toss and elected to bat.
- Tarisai Musakanda (Mid West Rhinos) scored his maiden century in first-class cricket.
- Carl Mumba (Mid West Rhinos) took the best figures for a bowler taking six wickets in first-class cricket in Zimbabwe.

=== Round 2 ===
14–17 December 2018
Scorecard

Mid West Rhinos	v	Mashonaland Eagles
352 (109.5 overs); Nyasha Mayavo 73 (129); Faraz Akram 3/46 (18.5 overs)		455/9d (103.5 overs); Elton Chigumbura 98 (99); Brandon Mavuta 7/157 (33.5 overs)
86 (32 overs); Nyasha Mayavo 17* (70); Chamu Chibhabha 4/19 (13 overs)

Mashonaland Eagles won by an innings and 17 runs
Harare Sports Club, Harare
Umpires: Sifelani Rwaziyeni and Langton Rusere

- Mashonaland Eagles won the toss and elected to field.

=== Round 3 ===
14–17 January 2019
Scorecard

Mountaineers	v	Mashonaland Eagles
72/3 (23.5 overs); Innocent Kaia 41 (72); Chamu Chibhabha 2/30 (6.5 overs)

Match drawn
Harare Sports Club, Harare
Umpires: Langton Rusere and Walter Musakwa

- Mashonaland Eagles won the toss and elected to field.
- No play was possible on days 2 and 3 due to rain.
- The game was called off on the fourth day due to the Zimbabwe fuel protests.

14–17 January 2019
Scorecard

Mid West Rhinos	v	Matabeleland Tuskers
106/2 (22.2 overs); Bothwell Chapungu 45 (75); Chris Mpofu 2/42 (10 overs)

Match drawn
Old Hararians, Harare
Umpires: Sifelani Rwaziyeni and Iknow Chabi

- Matabeleland Tuskers won the toss and elected to field.
- No play was possible on days 2 and 3 due to rain.
- The game was called off on the fourth day due to the Zimbabwe fuel protests.

=== Round 4 ===
20–23 January 2019
Scorecard

Matabeleland Tuskers	v	Mashonaland Eagles
154 (55.2 overs); Brian Chari 57 (74); Trevor Garwe 5/34 (16.2 overs)		170 (43.5 overs); Richmond Mutumbami 70 (102); Chris Mpofu 6/60 (16.5 overs)
149 (48.1 overs); Brian Chari 54 (63); Tapiwa Mufudza 4/29 (14.1 overs)		136/3 (15.5 overs); Tinashe Kamunhukamwe 57 (35); Chris Mpofu 1/23 (5 overs)

Eagles won by 7 wickets
Old Hararians, Harare
Umpires: Stanley Gogwe and Iknow Chabi

- Matabeleland Tuskers won the toss and elected to bat.

20–23 January 2019
Scorecard

Mountaineers	v	Mid West Rhinos
236 (71.4 overs); Timycen Maruma 91 (173); Tendai Chisoro 4/22 (11 overs)		80 (26.5 overs); Bothwell Chapungu 27 (50); Victor Nyauchi 4/27 (10 overs)
16/0 (2 overs); Innocent Kaia 10* (6)		171 (44.5 overs) (f/o); Tarisai Musakanda 52 (59); Donald Tiripano 4/42 (12.5 overs)

Mountaineers won by 10 wickets
Harare Sports Club, Harare
Umpires: Christopher Phiri and Langton Rusere

- Mid West Rhinos won the toss and elected to field.

=== Round 5 ===
1–4 February 2019
Scorecard

Mid West Rhinos	v	Mashonaland Eagles
304/9d (72.5 overs); Tendai Chisoro 56* (64); Honest Ziwira 2/28 (9 overs)		269 (80.2 overs); Elton Chigumbura 71 (105); Kyle Jarvis 3/42 (19 overs)
347/8d (114 overs); Peter Moor 92 (197); Honest Ziwira 5/62 (17 overs)		120 (34.4 overs); Tinotenda Mutombodzi 49 (77); Brandon Mavuta 4/28 (9.4 overs)

Mid West Rhinos won by 262 runs
Old Hararians, Harare
Umpires: Stanley Gogwe and Langton Rusere

- Mid West Rhinos won the toss and elected to bat.
- Keith Jaure (Mashonaland Eagles) made his first-class debut.
- Honest Ziwira (Mashonaland Eagles) took his maiden five-wicket haul in first-class cricket.

1–4 February 2019
Scorecard

Mountaineers	v	Matabeleland Tuskers
497 (146.5 overs); Timycen Maruma 165 (225); Chris Mpofu 5/116 (33.5 overs)		127 (64 overs); Taffy Mupariwa 34 (114); Tendai Chatara 3/15 (12 overs)
		256 (66.4 overs) (f/o); Brian Chari 85 (105); Donald Tiripano 5/57 (19 overs)

Mountaineers won by an innings and 114 runs
Harare Sports Club, Harare
Umpires: Sifelani Rwaziyeni and Iknow Chabi

- Mountaineers won the toss and elected to bat.

=== Round 6 ===
7–10 February 2019
Scorecard

Mountaineers	v	Mashonaland Eagles
452/9d (107.4 overs); Timycen Maruma 120 (121); Chamu Chibhabha 3/89 (19.4 overs)		213 (52.4 overs); Regis Chakabva 64 (95); Shingi Masakadza 4/31 (9.4 overs)
17/0 (4.5 overs); Roy Kaia 11* (17)		255 (74.3 overs) (f/o); Richmond Mutumbami 99 (161); Victor Nyauchi 4/81 (19 overs)

Mountaineers won by 10 wickets
Old Hararians, Harare
Umpires: Stanley Gogwe and Christopher Phiri

- Mashonaland Eagles won the toss and elected to field.

7–10 February 2019
Scorecard

Mid West Rhinos	v	Matabeleland Tuskers
413 (109.3 overs); Peter Moor 139 (225); Sheunopa Musekwa 5/113 (30 overs)		413 (135.4 overs); Cunningham Ncube 119 (258); Tendai Chisoro 4/81 (32.4 overs)
188/3 (49 overs); Bothwell Chapungu 55 (59); Charles Kunje 1/28 (9 overs)

Match drawn
Harare Sports Club, Harare
Umpires: Sifelani Rwaziyeni and Langton Rusere

- Matabeleland Tuskers won the toss and elected to field.

13–16 February 2019
Scorecard

Mountaineers	v	Matabeleland Tuskers
277 (97.3 overs); Hamilton Masakadza 126 (198); Ernest Masuku 3/73 (17 overs)		119 (42.4 overs); Ernest Masuku 24 (31); Natsai Mushangwe 4/67 (14 overs)
243 (71.2 overs); Innocent Kaia 55 (93); Ainsley Ndlovu 5/109 (33.2 overs)		178 (68 overs); Brian Chari 50 (91); Natsai Mushangwe 4/36 (17 overs)

Mountaineers won by 223 runs
Harare Sports Club, Harare
Umpires: Iknow Chabi and Walter Musakwa

- Mountaineers won the toss and elected to bat.
- This match was originally scheduled to take place on 14 December 2018 in round two of the tournament, but was postponed.
