= 2019 Stanbic Bank 20 Series =

Cricket tournament

2018–19 Stanbic Bank 20 Series
- Dates: 11 – 17 March 2019
- Administrator(s): Zimbabwe Cricket
- Cricket format: Twenty20 cricket
- Tournament format(s): Round-robin and Final
- Champions: Matabeleland Tuskers (1st title)
- Participants: 4
- Matches: 14
- Most runs: Craig Ervine (328)
- Most wickets: Tendai Chatara (7)

The 2019 Stanbic Bank 20 Series was the eighth edition of the Stanbic Bank 20 Series, a Twenty20 cricket tournament in Zimbabwe. It took place from 11 to 17 March 2019. The tournament featured four teams, instead of the five that were scheduled to take part in the previous edition, with the Rising Stars being disbanded. There was no defending champion, as the previous edition of the tournament was cancelled.

Following the conclusion of the group stage, Mashonaland Eagles and Mid West Rhinos advanced to the third-place play-off match. Matabeleland Tuskers and Mountaineers progressed to the final. The final finished as a no result due to rain, so Matabeleland Tuskers were declared the winners, after finishing highest in the group stage of the tournament.

== Points table ==
The following teams competed in the tournament:

Team	Pld	W	L	NR	Pts	NRR
Matabeleland Tuskers	6	3	2	1	16	+1.866
Mountaineers	6	2	2	2	13	–0.662
Mashonaland Eagles	6	2	2	2	12	–0.647
Mid West Rhinos	6	2	3	1	10	–0.922

Champions

== Fixtures ==
=== Round-robin ===
11 March 2019
Scorecard

Mid West Rhinos; 219/4 (20 overs)	v	Mountaineers; 205/6 (20 overs)
Solomon Mire 109 (54); Tendai Chatara 3/15 (4 overs)		Forster Mutizwa 58 (35); Tendai Chisoro 2/24 (4 overs)

Mid West Rhinos won by 14 runs
Old Hararians, Harare
Umpires: Langton Rusere and Christopher Phiri
Player of the match: Solomon Mire (Mid West Rhinos)

- Mid West Rhinos won the toss and elected to bat.
- Tafadzwa Tsiga (Mountaineers) and Anthony Moor (Mid West Rhinos) both made their T20 debuts.

11 March 2019
Scorecard

Matabeleland Tuskers; 179/8 (20 overs)	v	Mashonaland Eagles; 155/8 (20 overs)
Tendai Maruma 53 (24); Daniel Jakiel 3/34 (4 overs)		Regis Chakabva 61 (35); Thabo Mboyi 3/31 (4 overs)

Matabeleland Tuskers won by 24 runs
Harare Sports Club, Harare
Umpires: Langton Rusere and Christopher Phiri

- Matabeleland Tuskers won the toss and elected to bat.
- Daniel Jakiel (Mashonaland Eagles), Charles Kunje and Ernest Masuku (Matabeleland Tuskers) all made their T20 debuts.

12 March 2019
Scorecard

Mashonaland Eagles; 82 (16.3 overs)	v	Mountaineers; 84/4 (12.4 overs)
Cephas Zhuwao 51 (31); Tendai Chatara 3/13 (4 overs)		Innocent Kaia 44 (36); Richard Ngarava 2/23 (3.4 overs)

Mountaineers won by 6 wickets
Harare Sports Club, Harare
Umpires: Iknow Chabi and Walter Musakwa

- Mountaineers won the toss and elected to field.

12 March 2019
Scorecard

Matabeleland Tuskers; 180/9 (20 overs)	v	Mid West Rhinos; 183/6 (18.5 overs)
Craig Ervine 96 (53); Solomon Mire 2/28 (3 overs)		Prince Masvaure 48 (28); John Nyumbu 2/27 (4 overs)

Mid West Rhinos won by 4 wickets
Old Hararians, Harare
Umpires: Stanley Gogwe and Russell Tiffin

- Matabeleland Tuskers won the toss and elected to bat.
- Cunningham Ncube (Matabeleland Tuskers) made his T20 debut.

13 March 2019
Scorecard

Mashonaland Eagles; 197/4 (20 overs)	v	Matabeleland Tuskers; 182/2 (20 overs)
Brian Mudzinganyama 62 (38); Ainsley Ndlovu 2/30 (4 overs)		Craig Ervine 83* (46); Trevor Garwe 2/32 (4 overs)

Mashonaland Eagles won by 15 runs
Harare Sports Club, Harare
Umpires: Stanley Gogwe and Langton Rusere

- Matabeleland Tuskers won the toss and elected to field.
- Brian Mudzinganyama (Mashonaland Eagles) made his T20 debut.

13 March 2019
Scorecard

Mid West Rhinos; 182/5 (20 overs)	v	Mountaineers; 184/7 (19 overs)
Solomon Mire 55 (28); Natsai M'shangwe 3/29 (4 overs)		Shingi Masakadza 48 (25); Neville Madziva 2/30 (3 overs)

Mountaineers won by 3 wickets
Old Hararians, Harare
Umpires: Sifelani Rwaziyeni and Christopher Phiri

- Mid West Rhinos won the toss and elected to bat.
- Carl Mumba (Mid West Rhinos) made his T20 debut.

14 March 2019
Scorecard

Mid West Rhinos; 158/4 (20 overs)	v	Mashonaland Eagles; 159/4 (17.3 overs)
Ryan Burl 77* (48); Trevor Garwe 3/25 (4 overs)		Cephas Zhuwao 73 (46); Kyle Jarvis 1/23 (3 overs)

Mashonaland Eagles won by 6 wickets
Harare Sports Club, Harare
Umpires: Stanley Gogwe and Walter Musakwa
Player of the match: Cephas Zhuwao (Mashonaland Eagles)

- Mashonaland Eagles won the toss and elected to field.

14 March 2019
Scorecard

Matabeleland Tuskers; 175/6 (20 overs)	v	Mountaineers; 69 (13.2 overs)
Brian Chari 93 (55); William Mashinge 1/27 (4 overs)		Roy Kaia 18 (18); Milton Shumba 4/4 (2.4 overs)

Matabeleland Tuskers won by 106 runs
Old Hararians, Harare
Umpires: Oscar Tafirenyika and Langton Rusere

- Mountaineers won the toss and elected to field.
- Charlton Tshuma (Matabeleland Tuskers) made his T20 debut.

15 March 2019
Scorecard

Matabeleland Tuskers; 189/4 (20 overs)	v	Mid West Rhinos; 106 (18.3 overs)
Craig Ervine 73* (43); Solomon Mire 1/17 (2 overs)		Tendai Chisoro 21 (20); Charlton Tshuma 3/23 (4 overs)

Matabeleland Tuskers won by 83 runs
Harare Sports Club, Harare
Umpires: Sifelani Rwaziyeni and Oscar Tafirenyika

- Mid West Rhinos won the toss and elected to field.
- Sheunopa Musekwa (Matabeleland Tuskers) and Christophe Masike (Mid West Rhinos) both made their T20 debuts.

15 March 2019
Scorecard

Mashonaland Eagles	v	Mountaineers

Match abandoned
Harare Sports Club, Harare
Umpires: Walter Musakwa and Christopher Phiri

- No toss.
- No play was possible due to rain.

16 March 2019
Scorecard

Matabeleland Tuskers	v	Mountaineers

Match abandoned
Harare Sports Club, Harare
Umpires: Stanley Gogwe and Langton Rusere

- No toss.
- No play was possible due to rain.

16 March 2019
Scorecard

Mashonaland Eagles	v	Mid West Rhinos

Match abandoned
Harare Sports Club, Harare
Umpires: Sifelani Rwaziyeni and Tafadzwa Musakwa

- No toss.
- No play was possible due to rain.

== Finals ==
3rd place play-off
17 March 2019
Scorecard

Mashonaland Eagles; 115/7 (20 overs)	v	Mid West Rhinos; 47/2 (7.3 overs)
Cephas Zhuwao 48 (29); Manson Chikowero 3/10 (4 overs)		Solomon Mire 21 (20); Faraz Akram 1/5 (2 overs)

Mid West Rhinos won by 7 runs (D/L method)
Harare Sports Club, Harare
Umpires: Sifelani Rwaziyeni and Stanley Gogwe

- Mid West Rhinos won the toss and elected to field.
- Tony Munyonga (Mashonaland Eagles) and Manson Chikowero (Mid West Rhinos) both made their T20 debuts.

Final
17 March 2019
Scorecard

Matabeleland Tuskers; 113/5 (17.2 overs)	v	Mountaineers
Craig Ervine 55* (46); Roy Kaia 3/8 (2 overs)

No result
Harare Sports Club, Harare
Umpires: Langton Rusere and Christopher Phiri

- Mountaineers won the toss and elected to field.
