= Zimbabwean cricket team against Afghanistan in the UAE in 2020–21 =

International cricket tour

Zimbabwe against Afghanistan in the UAE in 2020–21
	Afghanistan	Zimbabwe
- Dates: 2 – 20 March 2021
Captains	Asghar Afghan	Sean Williams

Test series
- Result: 2-match series drawn 1–1
Most runs	Hashmatullah Shahidi (215)	Sean Williams (264)
Most wickets	Rashid Khan (11)	Blessing Muzarabani (8)
- Player of the series: Sean Williams (Zim)

Twenty20 International series
- Results: Afghanistan won the 3-match series 3–0
Most runs	Rahmanullah Gurbaz (114)	Ryan Burl (81)
Most wickets	Rashid Khan (6)	Blessing Muzarabani (6)
- Player of the series: Karim Janat (Afg)

The Zimbabwe cricket team toured the United Arab Emirates in March 2021 to play two Test and three Twenty20 International (T20I) matches against Afghanistan. It was the first time the two teams had played a Test match against each other. Ahmed Shah Pakteen was named as the on-field umpire for both Tests, becoming the first Afghan umpire to officiate in Test cricket.

Originally, the series was scheduled to be played in Oman. In January 2021, the International Cricket Council (ICC) gave accreditation for the Ministry Turf 1 at the Al Amerat Cricket Stadium in Muscat to host Test cricket. However, in February 2021, the Afghanistan Cricket Board (ACB) confirmed that the series would take place in the UAE. The series was initially in doubt due to the COVID-19 pandemic, however in late January 2021, Zimbabwe's Sports and Recreation Commission gave its approval for the tour to go ahead. On 12 February 2021, the ACB announced the tour schedule.

Zimbabwe won the first Test inside two days by ten wickets, with captain Sean Williams scoring a century in their first innings. Zimbabwe last won a Test match in November 2018, when they beat Bangladesh. Afghanistan won the second Test match by six wickets to draw the series 1–1, with Hashmatullah Shahidi becoming the first batsman for Afghanistan to score a double century in Test cricket.

Afghanistan won the first two T20I matches, by 48 and 45 runs, respectively, to win the series with a game to spare. Afghanistan won the third and final match by 47 runs, with Asghar Afghan claiming the record of winning the highest number of matches as captain in men's T20I cricket.

== Squads ==
Tests		T20Is	
Afghanistan	Zimbabwe	Afghanistan	Zimbabwe
Asghar Afghan (c); Munir Ahmad; Javed Ahmadi; Yamin Ahmadzai; Fazalhaq Farooqi; Amir Hamza; Nasir Jamal; Rashid Khan; Abdul Malik; Wafadar Momand; Mohammad Saleem; Bahir Shah; Rahmat Shah; Hashmatullah Shahidi; Shahidullah; Sayed Shirzad; Zia-ur-Rehman; Ibrahim Zadran; Afsar Zazai (wk)	Sean Williams (c); Ryan Burl; Regis Chakabva (wk); Kevin Kasuza; Wesley Madhevere; Wellington Masakadza; Prince Masvaure; Brandon Mavuta; Tarisai Musakanda; Richmond Mutumbami; Blessing Muzarabani; Richard Ngarava; Victor Nyauchi; Sikandar Raza; Donald Tiripano	Asghar Afghan (c); Fareed Ahmad; Sharafuddin Ashraf; Fazalhaq Farooqi; Usman Ghani; Rahmanullah Gurbaz (wk); Amir Hamza; Karim Janat; Rashid Khan; Mohammad Nabi; Hashmatullah Shahidi; Naveen-ul-Haq; Ibrahim Zadran; Najibullah Zadran; Afsar Zazai (wk)	Sean Williams (c); Faraz Akram; Ryan Burl; Regis Chakabva (wk); Kevin Kasuza; Tinashe Kamunhukamwe; Wesley Madhevere; Wellington Masakadza; Prince Masvaure; Brandon Mavuta; Tarisai Musakanda; Richmond Mutumbami; Blessing Muzarabani; Richard Ngarava; Victor Nyauchi; Sikandar Raza; Milton Shumba; Donald Tiripano

Afghanistan also named Zahir Khan and Abdul Wasi as reserve players for the Test matches. Chamu Chibhabha, Zimbabwe's limited overs captain, did not travel for the T20I matches due to an injury. The Afghanistan Cricket Board also confirmed that Mujeeb Ur Rahman, Hamid Hassan, Gulbadin Naib, Waqar Salamkheil, Azmatullah Omarzai could join the T20I squad once their visa issues had been resolved.

== Tour match ==
25–27 February 2021
Scorecard

Zimbabwe	v	Afghanistan A
505/6d (135 overs); Kevin Kasuza 129 (197); Mohammad Saleem 2/75 (21 overs)		271/8 (113.2 overs); Munir Ahmad 125* (320); Donald Tiripano 2/18 (10 overs)

Match drawn
Sheikh Zayed Cricket Stadium, Abu Dhabi

- Zimbabwe won the toss and elected to bat.

== Test series ==
=== 1st Test ===
2–6 March 2021 (Note: While five days of play were scheduled for each Test, the first Test reached a result in two days.)
Scorecard

Afghanistan	v	Zimbabwe
131 (47 overs); Afsar Zazai 37 (70); Blessing Muzarabani 4/48 (12 overs)		250 (72 overs); Sean Williams 105 (174); Amir Hamza 6/75 (25 overs)
135 (45.3 overs); Ibrahim Zadran 76 (145); Donald Tiripano 3/23 (9.3 overs)		17/0 (3.2 overs); Kevin Kasuza 11* (12)

Zimbabwe won by 10 wickets
Sheikh Zayed Cricket Stadium, Abu Dhabi
Umpires: Aleem Dar (Pak) and Ahmed Shah Pakteen (Afg)
Player of the match: Sean Williams (Zim)

- Afghanistan won the toss and elected to bat.
- Munir Ahmad, Abdul Malik, Abdul Wasi (Afg) and Wesley Madhevere (Zim) all made their Test debuts.
- Ahmed Shah Pakteen (Afg) stood in his first Test as an umpire.
- Blessing Muzarabani became the first bowler for Zimbabwe to take a wicket with the first ball of a Test.
- Abdul Malik became the first batsman for Afghanistan to be dismissed for a pair in Tests.

=== 2nd Test ===
10–14 March 2021
Scorecard

Afghanistan	v	Zimbabwe
545/4d (160.4 overs); Hashmatullah Shahidi 200* (443); Ryan Burl 1/69 (20 overs)		287 (91.3 overs); Sikandar Raza 85 (129); Rashid Khan 4/138 (36.3 overs)
108/4 (26.1 overs); Rahmat Shah 58 (76); Ryan Burl 2/16 (4 overs)		365 (148.5 overs) (f/o); Sean Williams 151* (309); Rashid Khan 7/137 (62.5 overs)

Afghanistan won by 6 wickets
Sheikh Zayed Cricket Stadium, Abu Dhabi
Umpires: Aleem Dar (Pak) and Ahmed Shah Pakteen (Afg)
Player of the match: Hashmatullah Shahidi (Afg)

- Afghanistan won the toss and elected to bat.
- Shahidullah and Sayed Shirzad (Afg) both made their Test debuts.
- Asghar Afghan (Afg) scored his first century in Tests.
- Hashmatullah Shahidi scored his first Test century, and became the first batsman for Afghanistan to score a double century in Tests.

== T20I series ==
=== 1st T20I ===
17 March 2021
14:00
Scorecard

Afghanistan; 198/5 (20 overs)	v	Zimbabwe; 150/7 (20 overs)
Rahmanullah Gurbaz 87 (45); Blessing Muzarabani 2/38 (4 overs)		Tinashe Kamunhukamwe 44 (37); Rashid Khan 3/28 (4 overs)

Afghanistan won by 48 runs
Sheikh Zayed Cricket Stadium, Abu Dhabi
Umpires: Aleem Dar (Pak) and Izatullah Safi (Afg)
Player of the match: Rahmanullah Gurbaz (Afg)

- Zimbabwe won the toss and elected to field.
- Asghar Afghan played in his 50th T20I as a captain of Afghanistan.

=== 2nd T20I ===
19 March 2021
14:00
Scorecard

Afghanistan; 193/5 (20 overs)	v	Zimbabwe; 148 (17.1 overs)
Karim Janat 53 (38); Blessing Muzarabani 2/44 (4 overs)		Ryan Burl 40 (29); Rashid Khan 3/30 (3 overs)

Afghanistan won by 45 runs
Sheikh Zayed Cricket Stadium, Abu Dhabi
Umpires: Aleem Dar (Pak) and Ahmed Shah Durrani (Afg)
Player of the match: Mohammad Nabi (Afg)

- Afghanistan won the toss and elected to bat.
- Rashid Khan (Afg) played in his 50th T20I.

=== 3rd T20I ===
20 March 2021
14:00
Scorecard

Afghanistan; 183/7 (20 overs)	v	Zimbabwe; 136/5 (20 overs)
Najibullah Zadran 72* (35); Richard Ngarava 2/35 (4 overs)		Sikandar Raza 41* (29); Karim Janat 2/34 (4 overs)

Afghanistan won by 47 runs
Sheikh Zayed Cricket Stadium, Abu Dhabi
Umpires: Aleem Dar (Pak) and Izatullah Safi (Afg)
Player of the match: Najibullah Zadran (Afg)

- Afghanistan won the toss and elected to bat.
- Fazalhaq Farooqi (Afg) made his T20I debut.
- Aleem Dar (Pak) became the first on-field umpire to stand in 400 matches in international cricket.
