= 2017–18 Logan Cup =

Cricket tournament

- Dates: 4 October 2017 – 16 May 2018
- Administrator(s): Zimbabwe Cricket
- Cricket format: First-class cricket (4 days)
- Tournament format(s): League system
- Champions: Mountaineers (3rd title)
- Participants: 5
- Matches: 20
- Most runs: Cephas Zhuwao (821)
- Most wickets: Ernest Masuku (32)

The 2017–18 Logan Cup was the 24th edition of the Logan Cup, a first-class cricket competition that took place in Zimbabwe. It started on 4 October 2017 and included a new team, the Rising Stars, along with the existing four teams. Mountaineers were the defending champions.

In December 2017, Zimbabwe Cricket postponed all the remaining fixtures scheduled to take place in the tournament. Zimbabwe Cricket were struggling to pay players' salaries for November and December and wanted to upgrade their facilities for the 2018 Cricket World Cup Qualifier, which took place in Zimbabwe in March 2018. Initially, the tournament did not resume after the Cricket World Cup Qualifier, with the final three rounds not being played. However, in April 2018, Zimbabwe Cricket confirmed that the tournament would restart, with the remaining rounds of the competition played during April and May 2018. Mountaineers retained their title, after the final match ended as a draw.

== Point table ==
The following teams competed:

Team	Pld	W	L	D	A	Pts
Mountaineers	8	4	1	3	0	56
Mashonaland Eagles	8	3	2	3	0	49
Matabeleland Tuskers	8	3	3	2	0	44
Mid West Rhinos	8	2	3	3	0	37
Rising Stars	8	1	4	3	0	29

Champions

== Fixtures ==
=== Round 1 ===
4–7 October 2017
Scorecard

Matabeleland Tuskers	v	Mashonaland Eagles
238 (63.3 overs); Richmond Mutumbami 83 (117); Taurai Muzarabani 3/43 (14 overs)		200 (71.3 overs); Cephas Zhuwao 57 (102); Chris Mpofu 5/32 (20.3 overs)
470/5d (99 overs); Sean Williams 153 (195); Cuthbert Musoko 2/71 (14 overs)		364 (92.4 overs); Regis Chakabva 78 (115); Sikandar Raza 3/78 (19 overs)

Matabeleland Tuskers won by 144 runs
Takashinga Cricket Club, Harare
Umpires: Iknow Chabi and Sifelani Rwaziyeni

- Mashonaland Eagles won the toss and elected to field.

4–7 October 2017
Scorecard

Rising Stars	v	Mid West Rhinos
168 (53 overs); Ryan Burl 56 (126); Graeme Cremer 5/40 (17 overs)		293 (75.1 overs); Brendan Taylor 113 (202); Brandon Mavuta 4/57 (15.1 overs)
216 (72.5 overs); Ryan Burl 69 (108); Graeme Cremer 5/42 (19.5 overs)		92/3 (13.4 overs); Bothwell Chapungu 50 (44); Richard Ngarava 2/20 (4 overs)

Mid West Rhinos won by 3 wickets
Kwekwe Sports Club, Kwekwe
Umpires: Owen Chirombe and Stanley Gogwe

- Rising Stars won the toss and elected to bat.
- Aarsh Jha, Faraz Akram, Blessing Muzarabani, Richard Ngarava and Honest Ziwira (Rising Stars) all made their first-class debuts.

=== Round 2 ===
10–13 October 2017
Scorecard

Mountaineers	v	Mid West Rhinos
278 (97 overs); Donald Tiripano 73 (137); Tafara Chingwara 5/54 (21 overs)		230 (84.4 overs); Tendai Maruma 51 (86); Victor Nyauchi 4/48 (18.4 overs)
276/6d (89 overs); Tino Mawoyo 49 (80); Bradley Wadlan 4/113 (33 overs)		325 (79.3 overs); Prince Masvaure 124 (160); Victor Nyauchi 4/57 (14.3 overs)

Mountaineers won by 2 runs
Old Hararians, Harare
Umpires: Iknow Chabi and Owen Chirombe

- Mid West Rhinos won the toss and elected to field.
- Jameson Chikowero, Trevor Chibvongodze and Trevor Gwandu (Mid West Rhinos) all made their first-class debuts.

10–13 October 2017
Scorecard

Rising Stars	v	Mashonaland Eagles
179 (55.1 overs); Brandon Mavuta 40 (41); Tinotenda Mutombodzi 3/18 (6.1 overs)		180 (45.4 overs); Cephas Zhuwao 57 (61); Faraz Akram 4/49 (7.4 overs)
156 (37.5 overs); William Mashinge 28 (29); Taurai Muzarabani 6/70 (15.5 overs)		159/6 (33.3 overs); Nathan Waller 56* (54); Blessing Muzarabani 3/34 (10 overs)

Mashonaland Eagles won by 4 wickets
Takashinga Cricket Club, Harare
Umpires: Walter Musakwa and Sifelani Rwaziyeni

- Mashonaland Eagles won the toss and elected to field.

=== Round 3 ===
22–25 October 2017
Scorecard

Mountaineers	v	Mashonaland Eagles
366 (86.5 overs); Forster Mutizwa 88 (134); Cuthbert Musoko 3/55 (12 overs)		314 (96.1 overs); Tinotenda Mutombodzi 122 (195); Tendai Chatara 4/73 (22.1 overs)
302/5d (97 overs); Forster Mutizwa 124* (231); Tanyaradzwa Munyaradzi 2/69 (23 overs)		209/3 (55 overs); Joylord Gumbie 60 (127); Victor Nyauchi 2/20 (9 overs)

Match drawn
Harare Sports Club, Harare
Umpires: Iknow Chabi and Sifelani Rwaziyeni

- Mashonaland Eagles won the toss and elected to field.

22–25 October 2017
Scorecard

Rising Stars	v	Matabeleland Tuskers
247 (77.2 overs); Taffy Mupariwa 78 (188); John Nyumbu 4/49 (25.2 overs)		154 (59 overs); Charles Kunje 64* (136); Richard Ngarava 4/14 (10 overs)
307/7d (104 overs); Eddie Byrom 152 (327); Ainsley Ndlovu 3/53 (21 overs)		132 (41.1 overs); Cunningham Ncube 26 (77); Blessing Muzarabani 5/32 (11.1 overs)

Rising Stars won by 268 runs
Kwekwe Sports Club, Harare
Umpires: Owen Chirombe and Josphat Mutapure

- Matabeleland Tuskers won the toss and elected to field.
- Eddie Byrom (Rising Stars) scored his maiden first-class century.

=== Round 4 ===
6–9 November 2017
Scorecard

Mashonaland Eagles	v	Mid West Rhinos
321 (91.1 overs); Nathan Waller 58 (82); Bothwell Chapungu 7/83 (23 overs)		278 (79.5 overs); Bothwell Chapungu 63 (81); Herbert Chikomba 4/99 (28 overs)
370/8d (81 overs); Regis Chakabva 138 (124); Michael Chinouya 3/39 (12 overs)		117 (41.4 overs); Trevor Chibvongodze 28 (36); Herbert Chikomba 5/37 (17.4 overs)

Mashonaland Eagles won by 296 runs
Kwekwe Sports Club, Harare
Umpires: Stanley Gogwe and Langton Rusere

- Mashonaland Eagles won the toss and elected to bat.

6–9 November 2017
Scorecard

Mountaineers	v	Matabeleland Tuskers
269 (88 overs); Roy Kaia 70 (143); Luke Jongwe 3/40 (11 overs)		228 (65.5 overs); Craig Ervine 98* (149); Roy Kaia 4/44 (15 overs)
288 (90.3 overs); Mohammad Eqlakh 67 (106); Ernest Masuku 4/81 (18.3 overs)		223 (77.2 overs); Craig Ervine 91 (129); Tendai Chatara 3/21 (12 overs)

Mountaineers won by 106 runs
Takashinga Cricket Club, Harare
Umpires: Iknow Chabi and Jeremiah Matibiri

- Mountaineers won the toss and elected to bat.
- Mohammad Eqlakh and John Masara (Mountaineers) both made their first-class debuts.

=== Round 5 ===
12–15 November 2017
Scorecard

Mid West Rhinos	v	Matabeleland Tuskers
233 (98 overs); Bradley Wadlan 61 (74); John Nyumbu 3/63 (25 overs)		273/9d (81.1 overs); Cunningham Ncube 75 (199); Michael Chinouya 3/71 (27 overs)
138/2 (39 overs); Takudzwanashe Kaitano 55* (106); John Nyumbu 1/38 (13 overs)

Match drawn
Kwekwe Sports Club, Kwekwe
Umpires: Owen Chirombe and Stanley Gogwe

- Mid West Rhinos won the toss and elected to bat.
- Only 7 balls were bowled on day 1 and 41 overs bowled on day 2 due to rain.
- Jabulisa Tshuma (Mid West Rhinos) and Mphokuhle Dube (Matabeleland Tuskers) both made their first-class debuts.

12–15 November 2017
Scorecard

Mountaineers	v	Rising Stars
260 (73.3 overs); Vusi Sibanda 69 (89); Rugare Magarira 5/58 (21.3 overs)		185 (73.2 overs); Milton Shumba 61 (132); Victor Nyauchi 4/41 (20 overs)
262/6d (66.4 overs); Mohammad Eqlakh 153* (195); Blessing Muzarabani 2/23 (8 overs)		144 (61.4 overs); Ryan Murray 84 (162); Donald Tiripano 4/23 (12.4 overs)

Mountaineers won by 193 runs
Harare Sports Club, Harare
Umpires: Sifelani Rwaziyeni and Russell Tiffin

- Rising Stars won the toss and elected to field.
- Ryan Murray, Milton Shumba, Tony Munyonga and Rugare Magarira (Rising Stars) all made their first-class debuts.
- Mohammad Eqlakh (Mountaineers) scored his maiden first-class century.

=== Round 6 ===
21–24 November 2017
Scorecard

Mashonaland Eagles	v	Mountaineers
376/9d (100.2 overs); Tinotenda Mutombodzi 117 (179); Tendai Chatara 3/64 (20.2 overs)		379 (89.2 overs); Shingi Masakadza 140 (92); Liam Roche 3/32 (13.2 overs)
78/2 (20.5 overs); Cephas Zhuwao 43 (45); Victor Nyauchi 1/9 (5 overs)

Match drawn
Takashinga Cricket Club, Harare
Umpires: Iknow Chabi and Langton Rusere

- Mountaineers won the toss and elected to field.
- No play was possible on day 4 due to rain.
- Liam Roche (Mashonaland Eagles) made his first-class debut.

21–24 November 2017
Scorecard

Rising Stars	v	Matabeleland Tuskers
275 (86.1 overs); Brandon Mavuta 91 (90); Ernest Masuku 5/69 (21.1 overs)		260 (70 overs); Brian Chari 52 (96); Njabulo Ncube 4/40 (14 overs)
86 (28.3 overs); Eddie Byrom 26 (29); Sean Williams 4/26 (9 overs)		102/3 (18.2 overs); Brian Chari 37* (44); Njabulo Ncube 1/6 (2.2 overs)

Matabeleland Tuskers won by 7 wickets
Harare Sports Club, Harare
Umpires: Walter Musakwa and Russell Tiffin

- Matabeleland Tuskers won the toss and elected to field.

=== Round 7 ===
3–6 December 2017
Scorecard

Mashonaland Eagles	v	Mid West Rhinos
171 (58.5 overs); Elton Chigumbura 53 (68); Michael Chinouya 4/25 (14 overs)		224 (60.3 overs); Nyasha Mayavo 63 (89); Tinotenda Mutombodzi 4/24 (7.3 overs)
501 (107.1 overs); Cephas Zhuwao 265 (318); Tendai Chisoro 6/192 (47.1 overs)		281 (76.3 overs); Tendai Maruma 62 (51); Tinotenda Mutombodzi 5/60 (20.3 overs)

Eagles won by 167 runs
Harare Sports Club, Harare
Umpires: Sifelani Rwaziyeni and Russell Tiffin

- Mashonaland Eagles won the toss and elected to bat.
- Cephas Zhuwao (Mashonaland Eagles) scored his maiden first-class century.

3–6 December 2017
Scorecard

Matabeleland Tuskers	v	Mountaineers
68 (19.5 overs); Shoun Handirisi 16 (15); Shingi Masakadza 4/28 (6 overs)		357 (102 overs); Donald Tiripano 87* (186); Ernest Masuku 4/100 (27 overs)
328 (100 overs); Sean Williams 96 (173); Wellington Masakadza 6/132 (36 overs)		43/0 (9.4 overs); Mohammad Eqlakh 21* (27)

Mountaineers won by 10 wickets
Queens Sports Club, Bulawayo
Umpires: Jeremiah Matibiri and Christopher Phiri

- Matabeleland Tuskers won the toss and elected to bat.

=== Round 8 ===
19–22 April 2018
Scorecard

Mashonaland Eagles	v	Rising Stars
231 (69 overs); Cephas Zhuwao 51 (35); Brandon Mavuta 4/69 (21 overs)		339 (99.5 overs); Ryan Burl 134 (181); Tapiwa Mufudza 4/118 (32.5 overs)
533/9d (96 overs); Chamu Chibhabha 117 (149); Brandon Mavuta 4/158 (29 overs)		216/7 (75.3 overs); Ryan Burl 72* (157); Cephas Zhuwao 2/20 (8 overs)

Match drawn
Takashinga Cricket Club, Harare
Umpires: Iknow Chabi and Langton Rusere

- Mashonaland Eagles won the toss and elected to bat.
- Davis Murwendo, Thamsanqa Keith Nunu and Tinashe Muchawaya (Rising Stars) all made their first-class debuts.
- Ryan Burl (Rising Stars) was given out in the first innings by obstructing the field, after he pushed the ball away from the stumps to protect his wicket.

19–22 April 2018
Scorecard

Mid West Rhinos	v	Mountaineers
292 (63.5 overs); Bothwell Chapungu 128 (117); Clive Chitumba 4/24 (4.5 overs)		203 (71.2 overs); Donald Tiripano 49 (85); Tendai Chisoro 5/81 (27 overs)
378 (94.2 overs); Remembrance Nyathi 131 (178); Donald Tiripano 3/50 (19 overs)		261 (64.2 overs); Donald Tiripano 76 (130); Tendai Chisoro 8/94 (28.2 overs)

Mid West Rhinos won by 206 runs
Mutare Sports Club, Mutare
Umpires: Jeremiah Matibiri and Stanley Gogwe

- Mid West Rhinos won the toss and elected to bat.

=== Round 9 ===
1–4 May 2018
Scorecard

Mid West Rhinos	v	Rising Stars
378 (120.5 overs); Nyasha Mayavo 103 (175); Njabulo Ncube 5/109 (29.5 overs)		350 (105.5 overs); Tinashe Kamunhukamwe 83 (103); Michael Chinouya 3/97 (27 overs)
277/9d (82.1 overs); Prince Masvaure 86 (121); Thamsanqa Keith Nunu 3/66 (14 overs)		12/1 (5 overs); Tinashe Kamunhukamwe 6 (5); Michael Chinouya 1/10 (3 overs)

Match drawn
Harare Sports Club, Harare
Umpires: Russell Tiffin and Tafadzwa Musakwa

- Mid West Rhinos won the toss and elected to bat.

2–5 May 2018
Scorecard

Matabeleland Tuskers	v	Mashonaland Eagles
517 (141.2 overs); Cunningham Ncube 136 (280); Tapiwa Mufudza 5/205 (53.2 overs)		121 (70 overs); Keith Kondo 40 (112); Sikandar Raza 4/27 (14 overs)
160/5d (36.2 overs); Brian Chari 91 (101); Brendon Timoni 1/6 (3 overs)		202 (51.3 overs); Donald Samunderu 60 (59); John Nyumbu 3/44 (16.3 overs)

Matabeleland Tuskers won by 354 runs
Queens Sports Club, Bulawayo
Umpires: Lucky Ngwenya and Christopher Phiri

- Matabeleland Tuskers won the toss and elected to bat.
- Bright Phiri (Matabeleland Tuskers) made his first-class debut.

=== Round 10 ===
13–16 May 2018
Scorecard

Mid West Rhinos	v	Matabeleland Tuskers
327 (87.3 overs); Nyasha Mayavo 149 (220); Thabo Mboyi 4/46 (18 overs)		242 (64 overs); Shoun Handirisi 61 (81); Tendai Chitongo 3/22 (8 overs)
291/4d (71.2 overs); Prince Masvaure 106 (137); Ainsley Ndlovu 3/59 (19 overs)		171/3 (49 overs); Nkosana Mpofu 76* (151); Tendai Chisoro 3/61 (22 overs)

Match drawn
Queens Sports Club, Bulawayo
Umpires: Christopher Phiri and Owen Matibiri

- Matabeleland Tuskers won the toss and elected to field.

13–16 May 2018
Scorecard

Mountaineers	v	Rising Stars
420 (109.2 overs); Ngoni Mupamba 158 (260); Richard Ngarava 4/73 (26 overs)		386 (94.5 overs); Taffy Mupariwa 104 (205); Donald Tiripano 4/74 (26.5 overs)
139/6 (40 overs); Donald Tiripano 54* (82); Brandon Mavuta 4/35 (13 overs)

Match drawn
Takashinga Sports Club, Harare
Umpires: Iknow Chabi and Stanley Gogwe

- Mountaineers won the toss and elected to bat.
- No play was possible on day 4 due to rain.
- Ngoni Mupamba (Mountaineers) made his first-class debut and scored his maiden first-class century.
