= Zimbabwean cricket team in Pakistan in 2020–21 =

International cricket tour

	Pakistan	Zimbabwe
- Dates: 30 October – 10 November 2020
Captains	Babar Azam	Chamu Chibhabha

One Day International series
- Results: Pakistan won the 3-match series 2–1
Most runs	Babar Azam (221)	Brendan Taylor (204)
Most wickets	Four bowlers took five wickets each (Note: Mohammad Hasnain, Iftikhar Ahmed, Wahab Riaz and Shaheen Afridi all took five wickets each.)	Blessing Muzarabani (7)
- Player of the series: Babar Azam (Pak)

Twenty20 International series
- Results: Pakistan won the 3-match series 3–0
Most runs	Babar Azam (133)	Wesley Madhevere (103)
Most wickets	Usman Qadir (8)	Blessing Muzarabani (4)
- Player of the series: Usman Qadir (Pak)

The Zimbabwe cricket team toured Pakistan in October and November 2020 to play three One Day International (ODI) and three Twenty20 International (T20I) matches. All of the matches were played behind closed doors at the Rawalpindi Cricket Stadium. The ODI series formed part of the inaugural 2020–2023 ICC Cricket World Cup Super League. Pakistan's Babar Azam captained the team for the first time in ODI cricket.

In the second ODI, Aleem Dar of Pakistan stood in his 210th ODI match as an on-field umpire, surpassing South African Rudi Koertzen's record of officiating in the most ODI matches. In the second T20I, Ahsan Raza of Pakistan stood in his 50th T20I match as an on-field umpire, becoming the first umpire to reach the milestone in T20I cricket.

Pakistan won the first two ODI matches to take an unassailable lead in the series. The third match was tied, with Zimbabwe winning the Super Over. It was Zimbabwe's first win in an ODI in Pakistan since November 1998. Pakistan also won the first two T20I matches to win the series. They also won the third T20I by eight wickets to take the series 3–0. Zimbabwe's Elton Chigumbura retired from international cricket following the conclusion of the tour.

== Background ==
In August 2020, the Pakistan Cricket Board (PCB) announced that the tour was still going ahead as planned, and were preparing a bio-secure environment, due to the COVID-19 pandemic. Initially, the PCB were considering to host both the T20I and ODI series at a single venue in Lahore. However, in September 2020, it was announced that the T20I and ODI series would be held in Rawalpindi and Multan respectively. On 9 October 2020, the PCB moved the matches from Multan to Lahore, following a disagreement with the government in the city over finances. Multan last hosted international matches in April 2008, when Bangladesh played at the venue.

On 11 October 2020, the PCB confirmed the itinerary for the series, with the ODI matches taking place in Rawalpindi, and the T20I matches taking place in Lahore. Smog had been forecast in Lahore during November, with the PCB monitoring the situation. On 23 October 2020, the PCB made a further change to the tour, moving all the T20I matches from Lahore to Rawalpindi, because of the concerns about the smog.

In September 2020, Zimbabwe Cricket stated that the official confirmation of travelling to Pakistan was imminent. Tavengwa Mukuhlani, chairman of Zimbabwe Cricket, said he was "hopeful" that the tour would go ahead. On 20 September 2020, Zimbabwe named a preliminary squad of 25 players to begin training ahead of the tour. On 23 September 2020, Zimbabwe Cricket received government permission to travel to Pakistan. On 19 October 2020, the Zimbabwe team departed from the Robert Gabriel Mugabe International Airport, arriving in Pakistan early the next day. The Zimbabwean head coach Lalchand Rajput did not travel with the team, so their bowling coach Douglas Hondo was put in charge of the team. The PCB also confirmed the match officials for the tour on the same day.

== Squads ==
ODIs		T20Is	
Pakistan	Zimbabwe	Pakistan	Zimbabwe
Babar Azam (c); Shaheen Afridi; Iftikhar Ahmed; Abid Ali; Haider Ali; Faheem Ashraf; Zafar Gohar; Mohammad Hasnain; Muhammad Musa; Usman Qadir; Haris Rauf; Wahab Riaz; Mohammad Rizwan (wk); Abdullah Shafique; Khushdil Shah; Haris Sohail; Imam-ul-Haq; Imad Wasim; Fakhar Zaman	Chamu Chibhabha (c); Faraz Akram; Ryan Burl; Brian Chari; Tendai Chatara; Elton Chigumbura; Tendai Chisoro; Craig Ervine; Tinashe Kamunhukamwe; Wesley Madhevere; Wellington Masakadza; Carl Mumba; Richmond Mutumbami (wk); Blessing Muzarabani; Richard Ngarava; Sikandar Raza; Milton Shumba; Brendan Taylor (wk); Donald Tiripano; Sean Williams	Babar Azam (c); Shaheen Afridi; Iftikhar Ahmed; Haider Ali; Faheem Ashraf; Zafar Gohar; Mohammad Hafeez; Mohammad Hasnain; Muhammad Musa; Rohail Nazir (wk); Usman Qadir; Haris Rauf; Wahab Riaz; Mohammad Rizwan (wk); Abdullah Shafique; Khushdil Shah; Imad Wasim; Fakhar Zaman	Chamu Chibhabha (c); Faraz Akram; Ryan Burl; Brian Chari; Tendai Chatara; Elton Chigumbura; Tendai Chisoro; Craig Ervine; Tinashe Kamunhukamwe; Wesley Madhevere; Wellington Masakadza; Carl Mumba; Richmond Mutumbami (wk); Blessing Muzarabani; Richard Ngarava; Sikandar Raza; Milton Shumba; Brendan Taylor (wk); Donald Tiripano; Sean Williams

On 19 October 2020, Misbah-ul-Haq, head coach and chief selector of the Pakistan team, named a twenty-two man squad of "probables" for the series. The squad travelled to Lahore to begin COVID-19 testing and training ahead of the ODI matches, with the squads for each format being named later. Pakistan's vice-captain, Shadab Khan, was ruled out of the ODI series, after suffering an injury during a warm-up game. Haider Ali was added to Pakistan's squad for the second ODI. He replaced Haris Sohail, who suffered an injury during the first ODI match. For the third and final ODI, Abdullah Shafique, Zafar Gohar and Mohammad Hasnain were added to the squad, replacing Imad Wasim, Abid Ali and Haris Rauf. However, on the morning of the third ODI, Haris Rauf was re-added to the team, after Faheem Ashraf was suffering from food poisoning.

Ahead of the T20I series, Abid Ali, Haris Sohail and Imam-ul-Haq were released from Pakistan's squad. Shadab Khan was also unavailable for selection for Pakistan's squad for the T20Is, due to his earlier injury which ruled him out of the ODI matches.

== ODI series ==
=== 1st ODI ===
30 October 2020
12:00 (D/N)
Scorecard

Pakistan; 281/8 (50 overs)	v	Zimbabwe; 255 (49.4 overs)
Haris Sohail 71 (82); Tendai Chisoro 2/31 (5 overs)		Brendan Taylor 112 (117); Shaheen Afridi 5/49 (10 overs)

Pakistan won by 26 runs
Rawalpindi Cricket Stadium, Rawalpindi
Umpires: Aleem Dar (Pak) and Ahsan Raza (Pak)
Player of the match: Brendan Taylor (Zim)

- Pakistan won the toss and elected to bat.
- Haris Rauf (Pak) made his ODI debut.
- Babar Azam captained Pakistan for the first time in ODIs.
- Brendan Taylor scored his 17th century in international cricket to become the batsman with the most centuries for Zimbabwe across all three formats.
- World Cup Super League points: Pakistan 10, Zimbabwe 0.

=== 2nd ODI ===
1 November 2020
12:00 (D/N)
Scorecard

Zimbabwe; 206 (45.1 overs)	v	Pakistan; 208/4 (35.2 overs)
Sean Williams 75 (70); Iftikhar Ahmed 5/40 (10 overs)		Babar Azam 77* (74); Tendai Chisoro 2/49 (10 overs)

Pakistan won by 6 wickets
Rawalpindi Cricket Stadium, Rawalpindi
Umpires: Aleem Dar (Pak) and Asif Yaqoob (Pak)
Player of the match: Iftikhar Ahmed (Pak)

- Zimbabwe won the toss and elected to bat.
- Haider Ali and Muhammad Musa (Pak) both made their ODI debuts.
- Iftikhar Ahmed (Pak) took his first five-wicket haul in ODIs.
- World Cup Super League points: Pakistan 10, Zimbabwe 0.

=== 3rd ODI ===
3 November 2020
12:00 (D/N)
Scorecard

Zimbabwe; 278/6 (50 overs)	v	Pakistan; 278/9 (50 overs)
Sean Williams 118* (135); Mohammad Hasnain 5/26 (10 overs)		Babar Azam 125 (125); Blessing Muzarabani 5/49 (10 overs)

Match tied
(Zimbabwe won the Super Over)
Rawalpindi Cricket Stadium, Rawalpindi
Umpires: Aleem Dar (Pak) and Rashid Riaz (Pak)
Player of the match: Blessing Muzarabani (Zim)

- Zimbabwe won the toss and elected to bat.
- Khushdil Shah (Pak) made his ODI debut.
- Mohammad Hasnain (Pak) took his first five-wicket haul in ODIs.
- Blessing Muzarabani (Zim) took his first five-wicket haul in ODIs.
- World Cup Super League points: Zimbabwe 10, Pakistan 0.

== T20I series ==
=== 1st T20I ===
7 November 2020
15:30 (D/N)
Scorecard

Zimbabwe; 156/6 (20 overs)	v	Pakistan; 157/4 (18.5 overs)
Wesley Madhevere 70* (48); Haris Rauf 2/25 (4 overs)		Babar Azam 82 (55); Blessing Muzarabani 2/26 (3.5 overs)

Pakistan won by 6 wickets
Rawalpindi Cricket Stadium, Rawalpindi
Umpires: Aleem Dar (Pak) and Asif Yaqoob (Pak)
Player of the match: Babar Azam (Pak)

- Zimbabwe won the toss and elected to bat.
- Usman Qadir (Pak) made his T20I debut.
- This was the first T20I match to be played at this venue.

=== 2nd T20I ===
8 November 2020
15:30 (D/N)
Scorecard

Zimbabwe; 134/7 (20 overs)	v	Pakistan; 137/2 (15.1 overs)
Ryan Burl 32* (22); Usman Qadir 3/23 (4 overs)		Haider Ali 66* (43); Blessing Muzarabani 2/33 (4 overs)

Pakistan won by 8 wickets
Rawalpindi Cricket Stadium, Rawalpindi
Umpires: Ahsan Raza (Pak) and Rashid Riaz (Pak)
Player of the match: Haider Ali (Pak)

- Pakistan won the toss and elected to field.

=== 3rd T20I ===
10 November 2020
15:30 (D/N)
Scorecard

Zimbabwe; 129/9 (20 overs)	v	Pakistan; 130/2 (15.2 overs)
Chamu Chibhabha 31 (28); Usman Qadir 4/13 (4 overs)		Abdullah Shafique 41* (33); Wellington Masakadza 1/19 (2 overs)

Pakistan won by 8 wickets
Rawalpindi Cricket Stadium, Rawalpindi
Umpires: Aleem Dar (Pak) and Ahsan Raza (Pak)
Player of the match: Usman Qadir (Pak)

- Zimbabwe won the toss and elected to bat.
- Abdullah Shafique (Pak), Faraz Akram and Milton Shumba (Zim) all made their T20I debuts.
