= Zimbabwean cricket team in Bangladesh in 2018–19 =

International cricket tour

	Bangladesh	Zimbabwe
- Dates: 19 October – 15 November 2018
Captains	Mahmudullah (Tests); Mashrafe Mortaza (ODIs)	Hamilton Masakadza

Test series
- Result: 2-match series drawn 1–1
Most runs	Mushfiqur Rahim (270)	Brendan Taylor (246)
Most wickets	Taijul Islam (18)	Kyle Jarvis (10)
- Player of the series: Taijul Islam (Ban)

One Day International series
- Results: Bangladesh won the 3-match series 3–0
Most runs	Imrul Kayes (349)	Sean Williams (226)
Most wickets	Mehedi Hasan (4); Mohammad Saifuddin (4); Nazmul Islam (4)	Kyle Jarvis (5)
- Player of the series: Imrul Kayes (Ban)

The Zimbabwe cricket team toured Bangladesh in October 2018 to play two Tests and three One Day International (ODI) matches. Bangladesh won the ODI series 3–0. Bangladesh's regular Test captain, Shakib Al Hasan, was unavailable due to injury and Mahmudullah captained the squad.

Originally the tour was scheduled to take place in January and February 2019. However, in May 2018, it was announced that the series could be moved to October 2018, because of security concerns around the Bangladeshi general election, scheduled to take place at the same time. In July 2018, both the Bangladesh Cricket Board (BCB) and Zimbabwe Cricket (ZC) confirmed the tour would be brought forward to October 2018. The fixtures were confirmed later in July 2018, with the Sylhet International Cricket Stadium scheduled to host its first Test match. During the first Test, it became Bangladesh's eighth Test venue.

Zimbabwe won the first Test by 151 runs. It was only their third away win in Tests and their first away win since 2001. Zimbabwe's last win in a Test match was five years earlier, against Pakistan in Harare. Bangladesh won the second Test by 218 runs, therefore drawing the series 1–1.

== Squads ==
Tests		ODIs	
Bangladesh	Zimbabwe	Bangladesh	Zimbabwe
Mahmudullah (c); Khaled Ahmed; Litton Das; Ariful Haque; Mominul Haque; Mehedi Hasan; Nazmul Islam; Shafiul Islam; Taijul Islam; Abu Jayed; Imrul Kayes; Mohammad Mithun; Mushfiqur Rahim (wk); Mustafizur Rahman; Najmul Hossain Shanto	Hamilton Masakadza (c); Ryan Burl; Regis Chakabva; Brian Chari; Tendai Chatara; Craig Ervine; Kyle Jarvis; Wellington Masakadza; Peter Moor; Brandon Mavuta; Christopher Mpofu; ~~Richard Ngarava~~; John Nyumbu; Sikandar Raza; Brendan Taylor (wk); Donald Tiripano; Sean Williams	Mashrafe Mortaza (c); Litton Das; Ariful Haque; Abu Hider; Rubel Hossain; Nazmul Islam; Imrul Kayes; Fazle Mahmud; Mahmudullah; Mehedi Hasan; Mohammad Mithun; Mushfiqur Rahim (wk); Mustafizur Rahman; Mohammad Saifuddin; Soumya Sarkar; Najmul Hossain Shanto	Hamilton Masakadza (c); Tendai Chatara; Elton Chigumbura; Craig Ervine; Kyle Jarvis; Wellington Masakadza; Solomon Mire; Peter Moor; Brandon Mavuta; Tarisai Musakanda; Richard Ngarava; John Nyumbu; Sikandar Raza; Brendan Taylor (wk); Donald Tiripano; Sean Williams; Cephas Zhuwao

After the initial squads were announced, Sikandar Raza was added to Zimbabwe's side for both the Test and ODI matches. Soumya Sarkar was added to Bangladesh's squad for the third ODI. Richard Ngarava was ruled out of Zimbabwe's squad for the two Tests, with Christopher Mpofu replacing him.

== Tour matches ==
=== 50 over match: Bangladesh Cricket Board XI vs Zimbabwe ===
19 October 2018
09:30
Scorecard

Zimbabwe; 178 (45.2 overs)	v	Bangladesh Cricket Board XI; 181/2 (39 overs)
Hamilton Masakadza 102 (138); Ebadot Hossain 5/19 (9 overs)		Soumya Sarkar 102* (114); Sikandar Raza 1/21 (6 overs)

Bangladesh Cricket Board XI won by 8 wickets
Bangladesh Krira Shikkha Protisthan No 4 Ground, Savar
Umpires: Masudur Rahman (Ban) and Sharfuddoula (Ban)

- Zimbabwe won the toss and elected to bat.

=== Three-day match: Bangladesh Cricket Board XI vs Zimbabwe ===
29–31 October 2018
Scorecard

Zimbabwe	v	Bangladesh Cricket Board XI
145/5d (48 overs); Hamilton Masakadza 39* (88); Ebadot Hossain 2/13 (6 overs)		56/2 (18 overs); Najmul Hossain Shanto 22* (54); Kyle Jarvis 1/8 (4 overs)

Match drawn
Zohur Ahmed Chowdhury Stadium, Chittagong
Umpires: Morshed Ali Khan (Ban) and Gazi Sohel (Ban)

- Bangladesh Cricket Board XI won the toss and elected to field.
- No play was possible on day 1 due to rain. Only 9 overs were bowled on day 2 due to rain.

== ODI series ==
=== 1st ODI ===
21 October 2018
14:30 (D/N)
Scorecard

Bangladesh; 271/8 (50 overs)	v	Zimbabwe; 243/9 (50 overs)
Imrul Kayes 144 (140); Kyle Jarvis 4/37 (9 overs)		Sean Williams 50* (58); Mehedi Hasan 3/46 (10 overs)

Bangladesh won by 28 runs
Sher-e-Bangla National Cricket Stadium, Dhaka
Umpires: Kumar Dharmasena (SL) and Sharfuddoula (Ban)
Player of the match: Imrul Kayes (Ban)

- Bangladesh won the toss and elected to bat.
- Fazle Mahmud (Ban) made his ODI debut.

=== 2nd ODI ===
24 October 2018
14:30 (D/N)
Scorecard

Zimbabwe; 246/7 (50 overs)	v	Bangladesh; 250/3 (44.1 overs)
Brendan Taylor 75 (73); Mohammad Saifuddin 3/45 (10 overs)		Imrul Kayes 90 (111); Sikandar Raza 3/43 (10 overs)

Bangladesh won by 7 wickets
Zohur Ahmed Chowdhury Stadium, Chittagong
Umpires: Masudur Rahman (Ban) and Rod Tucker (Aus)
Player of the match: Mohammad Saifuddin (Ban)

- Bangladesh won the toss and elected to field.

=== 3rd ODI ===
26 October 2018
14:30 (D/N)
Scorecard

Zimbabwe; 286/5 (50 overs)	v	Bangladesh; 288/3 (42.1 overs)
Sean Williams 129* (143); Nazmul Islam 2/58 (8 overs)		Soumya Sarkar 117 (92); Hamilton Masakadza 1/3 (1 over)

Bangladesh won by 7 wickets
Zohur Ahmed Chowdhury Stadium, Chittagong
Umpires: Kumar Dharmasena (SL) and Masudur Rahman (Ban)
Player of the match: Soumya Sarkar (Ban)

- Bangladesh won the toss and elected to field.
- Ariful Haque (Ban) made his ODI debut.
- Imrul Kayes and Soumya Sarkar set a new record for the highest partnership for the second wicket for Bangladesh in ODIs (220).
- Imrul Kayes scored the most runs for Bangladesh in a three-match ODI bilateral series (349).

== Test series ==
=== 1st Test ===
3–7 November 2018 (Note: While five days of play were scheduled for each Test, the first Test reached a result in four days.)
Scorecard

Zimbabwe	v	Bangladesh
282 (117.3 overs); Sean Williams 88 (173); Taijul Islam 6/108 (39.3 overs)		143 (51 overs); Ariful Haque 41* (96); Tendai Chatara 3/19 (10 overs)
181 (65.4 overs); Hamilton Masakadza 48 (104); Taijul Islam 5/62 (28.4 overs)		169 (63.1 overs); Imrul Kayes 43 (103); Brandon Mavuta 4/21 (10 overs)

Zimbabwe won by 151 runs
Sylhet International Cricket Stadium, Sylhet
Umpires: Richard Kettleborough (Eng) and Rod Tucker (Aus)
Player of the match: Sean Williams (Zim)

- Zimbabwe won the toss and elected to bat.
- Ariful Haque, Nazmul Islam (Ban), Wellington Masakadza and Brandon Mavuta (Zim) all made their Test debuts.
- This was the first Test to be played at this venue.
- Taijul Islam (Ban) took his first ten-wicket haul in Tests.

=== 2nd Test ===
11–15 November 2018
Scorecard

Bangladesh	v	Zimbabwe
522/7d (160 overs); Mushfiqur Rahim 219* (421); Kyle Jarvis 5/71 (28 overs)		304 (105.3 overs); Brendan Taylor 110 (194); Taijul Islam 5/107 (40.3 overs)
224/6d (54 overs); Mahmudullah 101* (122); Kyle Jarvis 2/27 (11 overs)		224 (83.1 overs); Brendan Taylor 106* (167); Mehedi Hasan 5/38 (18.1 overs)

Bangladesh won by 218 runs
Sher-e-Bangla National Cricket Stadium, Dhaka
Umpires: Kumar Dharmasena (SL) and Richard Kettleborough (Eng)
Player of the match: Mushfiqur Rahim (Ban)

- Bangladesh won the toss and elected to bat.
- Khaled Ahmed and Mohammad Mithun (Ban) both made their Test debuts.
- Mohammad Mithun became the most experienced first-class cricketer from Bangladesh to make his Test debut, with 88 matches.
- Mushfiqur Rahim (Ban) became the first wicket-keeper to score two double centuries in Tests.
- Mushfiqur Rahim also made the highest individual score (219), faced the most balls in an innings (421), and spent the most minutes at the crease in an innings (589) for a Bangladesh batsman in Tests.
- Brendan Taylor became the first batsman for Zimbabwe to score a century in each innings in a Test on two separate occasions.
