= 2019–20 Bangladesh Tri-Nation Series =

Cricket tournament

- 2019-20 Bangladesh Tri-series logo
- Date: 11–24 September 2019
- Location: Bangladesh
- Result: Bangladesh and Afghanistan shared the series
- Player of the series: (Afghanistan) Rahmanullah Gurbaz
Teams
Bangladesh	Afghanistan	Zimbabwe
Captains
Shakib Al Hasan	Rashid Khan	Hamilton Masakadza
Most runs
Mahmudullah (126)	Rahmanullah Gurbaz (133)	Hamilton Masakadza (133)
Most wickets
Mohammad Saifuddin (7)	Mujeeb Ur Rahman (7)	Christopher Mpofu (6); Kyle Jarvis (6)

The 2019–20 Bangladesh Tri-Nation Series was a cricket tournament that took place in September 2019. It was a tri-nation series featuring Bangladesh, Afghanistan and Zimbabwe with all the matches played as Twenty20 Internationals (T20Is).

Zimbabwe lost their first three matches of the series, therefore, Bangladesh and Afghanistan progressed to the final. No play was possible in the final due to rain, therefore Bangladesh and Afghanistan shared the trophy.

== Background ==
Originally, the Afghanistan cricket team were scheduled to tour Bangladesh in October 2019 to play one Test and two T20I matches. On 27 June 2019, it was announced that both the Bangladesh Cricket Board (BCB) and the Afghanistan Cricket Board (ACB) decided to replace the bi-lateral series with a tri-nation series, with these two teams joined by Zimbabwe. The tri-series started on 13 September, with the final scheduled to be held on 24 September.

However, in July 2019, the International Cricket Council (ICC) suspended Zimbabwe Cricket, with the team barred from taking part in ICC events. Despite the suspension by the ICC, Zimbabwe Cricket confirmed that they would still participate in the tri-series, as they could still play against other ICC members. The BCB confirmed the schedule for the tour in August 2019.

Following the 2019 Cricket World Cup, where Afghanistan lost all of their matches, Rashid Khan was named as the new captain of the Afghanistan cricket team across all three formats. Zimbabwe's captain, Hamilton Masakadza, retired from international cricket following the conclusion of the tri-series. Following the series, Zimbabwe played in another tri-series, in Singapore.

== Squads ==
Afghanistan	Bangladesh	Zimbabwe
Rashid Khan (c); Asghar Afghan (vc); Fareed Ahmad; Sharafuddin Ashraf; Rahmanullah Gurbaz (wk); Karim Janat; Mohammad Nabi; Gulbadin Naib; Fazal Niazai; Shafiqullah (wk); Shahidullah; Najeeb Tarakai; Naveen-ul-Haq; Mujeeb Ur Rahman; Dawlat Zadran; Najibullah Zadran; Hazratullah Zazai	Shakib Al Hasan (c); Yeasin Arafat; Litton Das; Mahedi Hasan; Afif Hossain; Mosaddek Hossain; Najmul Hossain Shanto; Rubel Hossain; Aminul Islam; Shafiul Islam; Taijul Islam; Mahmudullah; Mohammad Naim; Mushfiqur Rahim (wk); Mustafizur Rahman; Sabbir Rahman; Mohammad Saifuddin; Soumya Sarkar	Hamilton Masakadza (c); Ryan Burl; Regis Chakabva; Tendai Chatara; Craig Ervine; Kyle Jarvis; Neville Madziva; Timycen Maruma; Christopher Mpofu; Tony Munyonga; Richmond Mutumbami; Tinotenda Mutombodzi; Ainsley Ndlovu; Brendan Taylor (wk); Sean Williams

Bangladesh added Najmul Hossain Shanto, Rubel Hossain, Aminul Islam, Shafiul Islam and Mohammad Naim for the third and fourth T20Is, while Yeasin Arafat, Mahedi Hasan and Soumya Sarkar were dropped from the squad for the last two T20Is.

== Tour match ==
=== Twenty-over match: Bangladesh Cricket Board XI vs Zimbabwe ===
11 September 2019
12:00
Scorecard

Bangladesh Cricket Board XI; 142/7 (20 overs)	v	Zimbabwe; 144/3 (17.2 overs)
Sabbir Rahman 30 (31); Sean Williams 3/18 (4 overs)		Brendan Taylor 57* (44); Afif Hossain 3/19 (4 overs)

Zimbabwe won by 7 wickets
Khan Shaheb Osman Ali Stadium, Fatullah
Umpires: Tanvir Ahmed (Ban) and Masudur Rahman (Ban)

- Bangladesh Cricket Board XI won the toss and elected to bat.

== Points table ==
Pos	Team	Pld	W	L	T	NR	Pts	NRR
1	Bangladesh	4	3	1	0	0	6	0.378
2	Afghanistan	4	2	2	0	0	4	0.493
3	Zimbabwe	4	1	3	0	0	2	−0.885

== T20I series ==
=== 1st T20I ===
13 September 2019
18:30 (N)
Scorecard

Zimbabwe; 144/5 (18 overs)	v	Bangladesh; 148/7 (17.4 overs)
Ryan Burl 57* (32); Mosaddek Hossain 1/10 (3 overs)		Afif Hossain 52 (26); Neville Madziva 2/25 (3.4 overs)

Bangladesh won by 3 wickets
Sher-e-Bangla National Cricket Stadium, Dhaka
Umpires: Masudur Rahman (Ban) and Sharfuddoula (Ban)
Player of the match: Afif Hossain (Ban)

- Bangladesh won the toss and elected to field.
- The match was reduced to 18 overs per side due to rain.
- Taijul Islam (Ban) and Tony Munyonga (Zim) both made their T20I debuts.
- Taijul Islam became the first bowler for Bangladesh to take a wicket with his first delivery in T20Is.
- Ryan Burl scored the most runs by a Zimbabwe batsman off one over in T20Is (30).

=== 2nd T20I ===
14 September 2019
18:30 (N)
Scorecard

Afghanistan; 197/5 (20 overs)	v	Zimbabwe; 169/7 (20 overs)
Najibullah Zadran 69* (30); Sean Williams 2/16 (4 overs)		Regis Chakabva 42* (22); Rashid Khan 2/29 (4 overs)

Afghanistan won by 28 runs
Sher-e-Bangla National Cricket Stadium, Dhaka
Umpires: Sharfuddoula (Ban) and Gazi Sohel (Ban)
Player of the match: Najibullah Zadran (Afg)

- Zimbabwe won the toss and elected to field.
- Rahmanullah Gurbaz (Afg) and Ainsley Ndlovu (Zim) both made their T20I debuts.

=== 3rd T20I ===
15 September 2019
18:30 (N)
Scorecard

Afghanistan; 164/6 (20 overs)	v	Bangladesh; 139 (19.5 overs)
Mohammad Nabi 84* (54); Mohammad Saifuddin 4/33 (4 overs)		Mahmudullah 44 (39); Mujeeb Ur Rahman 4/15 (4 overs)

Afghanistan won by 25 runs
Sher-e-Bangla National Cricket Stadium, Dhaka
Umpires: Masudur Rahman (Ban) and Gazi Sohel (Ban)
Player of the match: Mohammad Nabi (Afg)

- Afghanistan won the toss and elected to bat.
- This was Afghanistan's twelfth consecutive win, a new record in T20Is.

=== 4th T20I ===
18 September 2019
18:30 (N)
Scorecard

Bangladesh; 175/7 (20 overs)	v	Zimbabwe; 136 (20 overs)
Mahmudullah 62 (41); Kyle Jarvis 3/32 (4 overs)		Richmond Mutumbami 54 (32); Shafiul Islam 3/36 (4 overs)

Bangladesh won by 39 runs
Zohur Ahmed Chowdhury Stadium, Chittagong
Umpires: Tanvir Ahmed (Ban) and Masudur Rahman (Ban)
Player of the match: Mahmudullah (Ban)

- Zimbabwe won the toss and elected to field.
- Aminul Islam and Najmul Hossain Shanto (Ban) both made their T20I debuts.
- Mustafizur Rahman (Ban) took his 50th wicket in T20Is.
- Bangladesh scored their highest total against Zimbabwe in T20Is.

=== 5th T20I ===
20 September 2019
18:30 (N)
Scorecard

Afghanistan; 155/8 (20 overs)	v	Zimbabwe; 156/3 (19.3 overs)
Rahmanullah Gurbaz 61 (47); Christopher Mpofu 4/30 (4 overs)		Hamilton Masakadza 71 (42); Mujeeb Ur Rahman 2/28 (4 overs)

Zimbabwe won by 7 wickets
Zohur Ahmed Chowdhury Stadium, Chittagong
Umpires: Tanvir Ahmed (Ban) and Sharfuddoula (Ban)
Player of the match: Christopher Mpofu (Zim)

- Afghanistan won the toss and elected to bat.
- Fazal Niazai (Afg) made his T20I debut.
- Hamilton Masakadza played in his final international match for Zimbabwe.
- This was Zimbabwe's first win against Afghanistan in T20Is.

=== 6th T20I ===
21 September 2019
18:30 (N)
Scorecard

Afghanistan; 138/7 (20 overs)	v	Bangladesh; 139/6 (19 overs)
Hazratullah Zazai 47 (35); Afif Hossain 2/9 (3 overs)		Shakib Al Hasan 70* (45); Naveen-ul-Haq 2/20 (4 overs)

Bangladesh won by 4 wickets
Zohur Ahmed Chowdhury Stadium, Chittagong
Umpires: Masudur Rahman (Ban) and Gazi Sohel (Ban)
Player of the match: Shakib Al Hasan (Ban)

- Bangladesh won the toss and elected to field.
- Naveen-ul-Haq (Afg) made his T20I debut.
- Shakib Al Hasan (Ban) took his 350th wicket in T20 cricket.

== Final ==
24 September 2019
18:30 (N)
Scorecard

Bangladesh	v	Afghanistan

Match abandoned
Sher-e-Bangla National Cricket Stadium, Dhaka
Umpires: Masudur Rahman (Ban) and Sharfuddoula (Ban)

- No toss.
- No play was possible due to rain.
