= Mohammad Eqlakh =

Zimbabwean cricketer (born 1996)

Personal information
- Born: 10 April 1996 (age 30)
- Source: Cricinfo, 6 November 2017

Mohammad Eqlakh (born 10 April 1996) is a Zimbabwean cricketer. He made his first-class debut for Mountaineers in the 2017–18 Logan Cup on 6 November 2017. Later in the same month, in his second match, he scored his maiden first-class century, with 153 not out against the Rising Stars.

He made his List A debut for Mountaineers in the 2017–18 Pro50 Championship on 1 December 2017.
