= Timycen Maruma =

Zimbabwean cricketer (born 1988)

Personal information
- Full name: Timycen Hlahla Maruma
- Born: 19 April 1988 (age 38); Harare, Zimbabwe
- Batting: Right-handed
- Bowling: Right-arm leg break
- Role: All-rounder

International information
- National side: Zimbabwe
- Test debut (cap 87): 17 April 2013 v Bangladesh
- Last Test: 7 July 2021 v Bangladesh
- ODI debut (cap 99): 22 August 2007 v South Africa
- Last ODI: 20 July 2021 v Bangladesh
- ODI shirt no.: 18
- T20I debut (cap 15): 10 October 2008 v Sri Lanka
- Last T20I: 29 September 2019 v Singapore

Career statistics
Competition	Test	ODI	T20I	FC
Matches	4	21	10	100
Runs scored	68	196	86	4,412
Batting average	9.71	11.52	14.33	31.07
100s/50s	0/0	0/0	0/0	7/25
Top score	41	35	23	165
Balls bowled	–	225	18	9,313
Wickets	–	4	1	205
Bowling average	–	57.50	20.00	24.68
5 wickets in innings	–	0	0	9
10 wickets in match	–	0	0	2
Best bowling	–	2/50	1/8	7/82
Catches/stumpings	1/–	12/–	4/–	77/–
- Source: ESPNcricinfo, 20 July 2021

Timycen Maruma (born 19 April 1988) is a Zimbabwean international cricketer. Beginning his cricketing career as a leg-spinner, he shifted his role to an all-rounder. In 2008, he scored his maiden first-class half-century (71) against a strong Pakistani representative team.

Maruma had his best first-class season to date in 2007 when he teamed up with fellow spinner Prosper Utseya to help Easterns province lift the Logan Cup.

He made his One Day International (ODI) debut against South Africa in 2007. He went on to make his Test debut as an opening batsman for Zimbabwe against Bangladesh in 2013. In September 2018, he was named in Zimbabwe's squad for the 2018 Africa T20 Cup tournament. He was the leading run-scorer in the 2018–19 Logan Cup, with 409 runs in six matches. In September 2019, he was named in Zimbabwe's Twenty20 International (T20I) squad for the 2019–20 Bangladesh Tri-Nation Series.

In December 2020, he was selected to play for the Mountaineers in the 2020–21 Logan Cup.
