= Thamsanqa Keith Nunu =

Zimbabwean cricketer (born 1998)

Personal information
- Born: 18 August 1998 (age 28)
- Source: Cricinfo, 17 April 2018

Thamsanqa Keith Nunu (born 18 August 1998) is a Zimbabwean cricketer. In February 2017, he was named in an academy squad by Zimbabwe Cricket to tour England later that year. He made his List A debut for Rising Stars in the 2017–18 Pro50 Championship on 17 April 2018. He made his first-class debut for Rising Stars in the 2017–18 Logan Cup on 19 April 2018. In December 2020, he was selected to play for the Tuskers in the 2020–21 Logan Cup.
