= List of Zimbabwe Twenty20 International cricketers =

This is a list of Zimbabwean Twenty20 international cricketers. A Twenty20 international (T20I) is an international cricket match between two representative teams, each having T20I status, as determined by the International Cricket Council (ICC). A T20I is played under the rules of Twenty20 cricket. The list is arranged in the order in which each player won his first T20I cap. Where more than one player won his first Twenty20 cap in the same match, their surnames are listed alphabetically.

== Key ==
General

- ‡ – Captain
- † – Wicket-keeper
- First – Year of debut
- Last – Year of latest game
- Mat – Number of matches played

Batting

- Runs – Runs scored in career
- HS – Highest score
- Avg – Runs scored per dismissal
- * – Batsman remained not out
- 50 – Half-centuries scored

Bowling

- Balls – Balls bowled in career
- Wkt – Wickets taken in career
- BBI – Best bowling in an innings
- Ave – Average runs per wicket

Fielding

- Ca – Catches taken
- St – Stumpings affected

== List of players ==
Statistics are correct as of 1 March 2026.

Zimbabwe T20I cricketers
General					Batting					Bowling					Fielding		Ref
No.	Name	First	Last	Mat	Runs	HS	Avg	50	100s	Balls	Wkt	BBI	Ave	5WI	Ca	St	Ref
1	Gary Brent	2006	2007	3	2	2	2.00	0	0	66	4	2/19	23.25	0	2	0	
2	Chamu Chibhabha‡	2006	2020	36	667	67	19.05	5	0	323	14	3/18	32.50	0	9	0	
3	Elton Chigumbura‡	2006	2020	57	893	54*	19.00	3	0	276	16	4/31	26.68	0	22	0	
4	Keith Dabengwa	2006	2010	8	46	16*	11.50	0	0	66	2	1/1	53.00	0	2	0	
5	Anthony Ireland	2006	2006	1	2	2*	–	0	0	18	1	1/33	33.00	0	0	0	
6	Hamilton Masakadza‡	2006	2019	66	1,662	93*	25.96	11	0	72	2	1/4	56.50	0	25	0	
7	Stuart Matsikenyeri	2006	2012	10	76	32	7.60	0	0	16	0	–	–	0	5	0	
8	Mluleki Nkala	2006	2006	1	1	1	1.00	0	0	–	–	–	–	–	0	0	
9	Brendan Taylor‡†	2006	2026	59	1,216	123	24.32	6	1	30	1	1/16	17.00	0	30	2	
10	Prosper Utseya‡	2006	2015	35	94	13*	8.30	0	0	749	26	3/25	33.00	0	6	0	
11	Sean Williams‡	2006	2025	85	1,805	77	23.75	12	0	1,242	49	3/15	29.24	0	29	0	
12	Tawanda Mupariwa	2007	2008	4	5	3*	–	0	0	78	1	1/22	94.00	0	0	0	
13	Vusi Sibanda	2007	2016	26	511	59	20.44	1	0	–	–	–	–	–	12	0	
14	Tatenda Taibu†	2007	2012	17	259	48*	28.77	0	0	24	0	–	–	0	6	5	
15	Timycen Maruma	2008	2019	13	100	23*	11.11	0	0	18	1	1/8	20.00	0	5	0	
16	Christopher Mpofu	2008	2020	32	35	17*	8.75	0	0	694	33	4/30	31.36	0	5	0	
17	Ray Price	2008	2012	16	15	7*	3.00	0	0	369	13	2/6	29.07	0	3	0	
18	Cephas Zhuwao	2008	2018	7	48	24	6.85	0	0	2	1	1/1	1.00	0	2	0	
19	Regis Chakabva†	2008	2022	49	682	48	14.51	0	0	–	–	–	–	–	27	2	
20	Graeme Cremer‡	2008	2026	35	71	17	5.07	0	0	696	40	3/11	20.72	0	12	0	
21	Greg Lamb	2010	2010	5	32	14*	16.00	0	0	73	4	2/14	20.00	0	0	0	
22	Shingirai Masakadza	2010	2013	7	18	9	4.50	0	0	117	4	2/39	52.75	0	2	0	
23	Charles Coventry†	2010	2015	13	127	30	12.70	0	0	–	–	–	–	–	2	0	
24	Craig Ervine‡	2010	2024	71	1,449	70	21.95	9	0	–	–	–	–	–	31	0	
25	Andy Blignaut	2010	2010	1	8	8	8.00	0	0	–	–	–	–	–	0	0	
26	Ed Rainsford	2010	2010	2	1	1*	–	0	0	36	0	–	–	0	0	0	
27	Tendai Chatara	2010	2024	60	49	8	8.16	0	0	1,281	65	3/7	23.95	0	7	0	
28	Kyle Jarvis	2011	2019	22	55	27	7.85	0	0	448	28	3/15	23.75	0	5	0	
29	Forster Mutizwa†	2011	2012	3	38	22	12.66	0	0	–	–	–	–	–	0	0	
30	Malcolm Waller†	2011	2018	32	613	68	26.65	1	0	30	0	–	–	0	9	0	
31	Keegan Meth	2012	2012	2	6	6*	–	0	0	42	0	–	–	0	1	0	
32	Brian Vitori	2012	2016	11	8	7*	–	0	0	238	4	1/24	80.75	0	2	0	
33	Natsai M'shangwe	2013	2014	5	5	5*	5.00	0	0	96	4	2/33	35.50	0	1	0	
34	Tinotenda Mutombodzi	2013	2020	15	134	32	12.18	0	0	156	7	2/12	26.85	0	2	0	
35	Tinashe Panyangara	2013	2016	14	23	17*	23.00	0	0	303	20	4/37	19.90	0	2	0	
36	Sikandar Raza‡	2013	2026	133	3,089	133*	26.62	17	1	2,196	107	5/18	23.54	1	54	0	
37	Tafadzwa Kamungozi	2014	2014	1	–	–	–	–	–	12	0	–	–	0	0	0	
38	Richmond Mutumbami†	2015	2022	29	379	54	17.22	1	0	–	–	–	–	–	23	5	
39	Neville Madziva	2015	2019	15	88	28*	17.60	0	0	281	12	4/34	34.75	0	4	0	
40	Taurai Muzarabani	2015	2016	9	0	0*	–	0	0	180	6	2/31	46.66	0	1	0	
41	Luke Jongwe	2015	2024	65	509	35	15.42	0	0	1,020	66	4/18	22.25	0	13	0	
42	Tendai Chisoro	2015	2020	14	43	14*	10.75	0	0	318	12	3/17	30.66	0	1	0	
43	Wellington Masakadza	2015	2026	79	260	34	8.66	0	0	1,348	49	4/11	34.00	0	34	0	
44	Peter Moor†	2016	2019	21	364	92*	24.26	1	0	–	–	–	–	–	7	0	
45	Donald Tiripano	2016	2022	23	156	28	14.18	0	0	417	16	3/20	38.56	0	4	0	
46	Ryan Burl‡	2018	2026	118	1,948	67*	25.29	4	0	1,172	62	3/13	22.77	0	59	0	
47	Solomon Mire	2018	2019	9	253	94	31.62	2	0	72	1	1/15	115.00	0	2	0	
48	Blessing Muzarabani	2018	2026	88	50	9*	2.94	0	0	1,875	106	4/17	21.34	0	14	0	
49	Tarisai Musakanda	2018	2021	12	197	43	16.41	0	0	–	–	–	–	–	6	0	
50	John Nyumbu	2018	2018	2	7	6*	–	0	0	36	0	–	–	0	0	0	
51	Brandon Mavuta	2018	2024	13	65	28	16.25	0	0	234	10	3/10	28.50	0	2	0	
52	Tony Munyonga	2019	2026	41	394	44	14.07	0	0	6	0	–	–	0	13	0	
53	Ainsley Ndlovu	2019	2024	12	33	13*	16.50	0	0	216	4	1/14	72.25	0	4	0	
54	Brian Chari	2019	2019	3	21	19	7.00	0	0	–	–	–	–	–	2	0	
55	Richard Ngarava	2019	2026	93	108	12*	5.40	0	0	1,970	114	4/16	21.36	0	18	0	
56	Daniel Jakiel (Note: Daniel Jakiel also played Twenty20 International matches for Malawi. Only his record for Zimbabwe is given above.)	2019	2019	2	–	–	–	–	–	42	3	2/27	14.66	0	0	0	
57	William Mashinge	2019	2019	2	–	–	–	–	–	30	1	1/37	57.00	0	2	0	
58	Tinashe Kamunhukamwe	2020	2024	15	304	44	20.26	0	0	–	–	–	–	–	1	0	
59	Wessly Madhevere	2020	2025	79	1,256	73*	19.03	7	0	420	15	2/7	32.73	0	28	0	
60	Carl Mumba	2020	2023	9	39	25	13.00	0	0	126	3	1/11	63.33	0	0	0	
61	Charlton Tshuma	2020	2020	1	–	–	–	–	–	6	0	–	–	0	0	0	
62	Faraz Akram	2020	2024	10	97	34*	24.25	0	0	149	2	1/44	128.00	0	2	0	
63	Milton Shumba	2020	2022	30	385	66*	20.26	1	0	72	4	3/16	25.75	0	18	0	
64	Tadiwanashe Marumani	2021	2026	67	1,276	86	19.93	7	0	–	–	–	–	–	25	4	
65	Dion Myers	2021	2026	37	613	96	19.77	2	0	60	0	–	–	0	11	0	
66	Innocent Kaia	2021	2024	19	290	54	15.26	1	0	12	0	–	–	0	10	0	
67	Tanaka Chivanga	2022	2022	3	–	–	–	–	–	39	0	–	–	0	1	0	
68	Brad Evans	2022	2026	31	140	43	10.76	0	0	622	46	4/16	18.00	0	10	0	
69	Victor Nyauchi	2022	2022	2	1	1*	–	0	0	42	3	3/29	22.00	0	2	0	
70	Clive Madande†	2022	2026	41	493	53*	18.25	1	0	–	–	–	–	–	20	1	
71	John Masara	2022	2022	1	–	–	–	–	–	6	0	–	–	0	0	0	
72	Gary Ballance	2023	2023	1	30	30	30.00	0	0	–	–	–	–	–	0	0	
73	Nick Welch	2023	2023	7	97	25	13.85	0	0	–	–	–	–	–	0	0	
74	Nyasha Mayavo†	2023	2023	1	–	–	–	–	–	–	–	–	–	–	0	0	
75	Brian Bennett	2023	2026	58	1,888	111	36.30	12	1	146	6	2/20	34.00	0	21	0	
76	Trevor Gwandu	2023	2025	19	24	8*	12.00	0	0	285	15	3/10	25.93	0	3	0	
77	Joylord Gumbie†	2024	2024	3	43	17	14.33	0	0	–	–	–	–	–	0	0	
78	Johnathan Campbell	2024	2024	9	123	45	15.37	0	0	–	–	–	–	–	3	0	
79	Tashinga Musekiwa	2024	2026	41	360	28	16.36	0	0	–	–	–	–	–	16	0	
80	Tinotenda Maposa	2024	2026	21	92	32	13.14	0	0	350	15	2/33	36.73	0	10	0	

== See also ==
- Twenty20
- Zimbabwean cricket team
- List of Zimbabwe Test cricketers
- List of Zimbabwe ODI cricketers
