= Tony Munyonga =

Zimbabwean cricketer

Personal information
- Full name: Tony Tanaka Munyonga
- Born: 31 January 1999 (age 27); Chitungwiza, Zimbabwe
- Batting: Right handed
- Bowling: Right arm offspin
- Role: Allrounder

International information
- National side: Zimbabwe (2019–present)
- ODI debut (cap 151): 7 August 2022 v Bangladesh
- Last ODI: 31 August 2025 v Sri Lanka
- ODI shirt no.: 32
- T20I debut (cap 52): 13 September 2019 v Bangladesh
- Last T20I: 23 November 2025 v Sri Lanka

Domestic team information
- Years: Team
- 2018–present: Eagles

Career statistics
Competition	ODI	T20I	FC	LA
Matches	9	36	42	61
Runs scored	145	359	2,117	1,570
Batting average	24.16	14.36	33.07	34.13
100s/50s	0/0	0/0	2/13	1/10
Top score	43*	44	237	153*
Balls bowled	6	6	2,443	1,305
Wickets	0	0	36	33
Bowling average	–	–	39.83	33.84
5 wickets in innings	–	–	1	0
10 wickets in match	–	–	0	0
Best bowling	–	–	5/99	4/9
Catches/stumpings	1/–	10/–	39/–	19/–
- Source: Cricinfo, 2 January 2026

Tony Tanaka Munyonga (born 31 January 1999) is a Zimbabwean cricketer. He made his first-class debut for Rising Stars in the 2017–18 Logan Cup on 12 November 2017.

He made his List A debut for Rising Stars in the 2017–18 Pro50 Championship on 17 April 2018. The Rising Stars won the tournament, and Munyonga was named the player of the series. He made his Twenty20 debut for Mashonaland Eagles in the 2018–19 Stanbic Bank 20 Series on 17 March 2019.

In April 2019, he was named in Zimbabwe's One Day International (ODI) squad for their series against the United Arab Emirates, but he did not play. In September 2019, he was named in Zimbabwe's Twenty20 International (T20I) squad for the 2019–20 Bangladesh Tri-Nation Series. He made his T20I debut for Zimbabwe, against Bangladesh, on 13 September 2019.

In December 2020, he was selected to play for the Mountaineers in the 2020–21 Logan Cup. In August 2022, he was named in Zimbabwe's ODI squad, for their series against Bangladesh. He made his ODI debut on 7 August 2022, for Zimbabwe against Bangladesh.
