= Eddie Byrom =

Irish-Zimbabwean cricketer (born 1997)

Personal information
- Full name: Edward James Byrom
- Born: 17 June 1997 (age 29); Harare, Zimbabwe
- Batting: Left-handed
- Bowling: Right-arm leg break
- Role: Batter

Domestic team information
- Years: Team
- 2017–2021: Somerset (squad no. 97)
- 2017/18: Rising Stars
- 2021: → Glamorgan (on loan)
- 2022–present: Glamorgan
- 2022/23: Mid West Rhinos
- 2023/24: Southern Rocks
- First-class debut: 26 June 2017 Somerset v Hampshire
- List A debut: 25 July 2021 Somerset v Derbyshire

Career statistics
Competition	FC	LA	T20
Matches	71	37	50
Runs scored	3,762	1,169	777
Batting average	30.83	35.42	18.50
100s/50s	7/16	2/9	0/3
Top score	176	123*	78*
Balls bowled	247	–	–
Wickets	3	–	–
Bowling average	57.66	–	–
5 wickets in innings	0	–	–
10 wickets in match	0	–	–
Best bowling	2/64	–	–
Catches/stumpings	40/–	13/–	14/–
- Source: ESPNcricinfo, 9 August 2026

Edward James Byrom (born 17 June 1997) is a Zimbabwean cricketer. Byrom qualifies to play for the Zimbabwe cricket team, as his place of birth, and for the Ireland cricket team, due to holding an Irish passport.

== Career ==
Byrom made his first-class debut for Somerset in the 2017 County Championship on 26 June 2017. He scored his maiden first-class half-century in the final match of the season against Middlesex to help Somerset to victory and Division One survival.

In October 2017, he signed for the Zimbabwean domestic team the Rising Stars, allowing him to play in the 2017–18 Logan Cup. In his first match for the Rising Stars, he made 152 in the second innings against Matabeleland Tuskers in Harare, his maiden first-class century.

He made his Twenty20 debut on 2 August 2019, for Somerset in the 2019 t20 Blast, hitting 54 runs from 19 balls. Byrom scored a century in the final of the 2020 Bob Willis Trophy. He made his List A debut on 25 July 2021, for Somerset in the 2021 Royal London One-Day Cup.

On 3 September 2021, Byrom joined Glamorgan on loan for the remainder of the 2021 season ahead of signing a two-year deal with the Welsh county.
