= Cunningham Ncube =

Zimbabwean cricketer (born 1990)

Personal information
- Born: 17 April 1990 (age 36)
- Source: Cricinfo, 25 October 2017

Cunningham Ncube (born 17 April 1990) is a Zimbabwean cricketer. He made his first-class debut for Westerns in the 2007–08 Logan Cup on 17 May 2008. He made his Twenty20 debut for Matabeleland Tuskers in the 2018–19 Stanbic Bank 20 Series on 12 March 2019. In December 2020, he was selected to play for the Tuskers in the 2020–21 Logan Cup. His fielding position is the Wicket-keeper and he bats right handed in almost all of his games.
