= Richard Ngarava =

Zimbabwean cricketer

Personal information
- Born: 29 December 1997 (age 28); Harare, Zimbabwe
- Height: 6 ft 6 in (198 cm)
- Batting: Left-handed
- Bowling: Left-arm fast-medium
- Role: Bowler

International information
- National side: Zimbabwe (2017–present)
- Test debut (cap 116): 29 April 2021 v Pakistan
- Last Test: 20 October 2025 v Afghanistan
- ODI debut (cap 133): 16 February 2017 v Afghanistan
- Last ODI: 31 August 2025 v Sri Lanka
- ODI shirt no.: 39
- T20I debut (cap 55): 29 September 2019 v Singapore
- Last T20I: 9 February 2026 v Oman
- T20I shirt no.: 39

Domestic team information
- Years: Team
- 2017: Mountaineers
- 2023: Galle Titans
- 2024: Sylhet Strikers
- 2024: Dubai Capitals

Career statistics
Competition	Test	ODI	T20I	FC
Matches	11	55	90	34
Runs scored	136	272	101	367
Batting average	9.71	12.95	5.05	11.46
100s/50s	0/0	0/0	0/0	0/0
Top score	28*	48	12*	35
Balls bowled	1,644	2,435	1,898	4,707
Wickets	25	70	108	95
Bowling average	38.56	30.68	21.38	26.50
5 wickets in innings	1	1	0	1
10 wickets in match	0	0	0	0
Best bowling	5/37	5/32	4/16	5/37
Catches/stumpings	1/–	9/–	17/–	15/–
- Source: ESPNcricinfo, 2 January 2026

Richard Ngarava (born 29 December 1997) is a Zimbabwean cricketer and captain in Test and ODI. He made his Twenty20 debut for Zimbabwe against Free State in the 2016 Africa T20 Cup on 9 September 2016. Earlier, he was part of Zimbabwe's squad for the 2016 Under-19 Cricket World Cup.

== Career ==
He made his List A debut for Zimbabwe A against Afghanistan A during Afghanistan's tour to Zimbabwe on 3 February 2017. Following the List A matches, Ngarava was added to Zimbabwe's One Day International (ODI) squad for the five-match series against Afghanistan. He made his ODI debut for Zimbabwe against Afghanistan at the Harare Sports Club on 16 February 2017. Also in February 2017, he was named in an academy squad by Zimbabwe Cricket to tour England later that year.

He made his first-class debut for Rising Stars in the 2017–18 Logan Cup on 4 October 2017. In June 2018, he was named in a Board XI team for warm-up fixtures ahead of the 2018 Zimbabwe Tri-Nation Series.

In September 2018, he was named in Zimbabwe's squad for the 2018 Africa T20 Cup tournament. Later the same month, he was named in Zimbabwe's Test squad for the series against Bangladesh. However, he was later ruled out of the Test series due to injury.

In September 2019, he was named in Zimbabwe's Twenty20 International (T20I) squad for the 2019–20 Singapore Tri-Nation Series. He made his T20I debut for Zimbabwe, against Singapore, in the Singapore Tri-Nation Series on 27 September 2019. In February 2021, Ngarava was named in Zimbabwe's Test squad for their series against Afghanistan. In April 2021, he was named in Zimbabwe's Test squad, for the series against Pakistan. He made his Test debut for Zimbabwe, against Pakistan, on 29 April 2021.
