= Brandon Mavuta =

Zimbabwean cricketer (born 1997)

Personal information
- Full name: Brandon Anesu Mavuta
- Born: 4 March 1997 (age 29); Kadoma, Zimbabwe
- Batting: Right-handed
- Bowling: Right-arm leg break
- Role: Bowler

International information
- National side: Zimbabwe (2018–present)
- Test debut (cap 107): 3 November 2018 v Bangladesh
- Last Test: 26 December 2024 v Afghanistan
- ODI debut (cap 139): 30 September 2018 v South Africa
- Last ODI: 26 November 2024 v Pakistan
- T20I debut (cap 51): 6 July 2018 v Australia
- Last T20I: 24 October 2024 v Kenya

Domestic team information
- Years: Team
- 2018: Durban Heat

Career statistics
Competition	Test	ODI	T20I	FC
Matches	5	14	13	55
Runs scored	82	92	65	1,521
Batting average	10.25	11.50	16.25	20.28
100s/50s	0/1	0/0	0/0	1/8
Top score	56	28*	28	104*
Balls bowled	1,002	420	234	9,885
Wickets	12	10	10	219
Bowling average	52.66	39.60	28.50	29.90
5 wickets in innings	1	0	0	12
10 wickets in match	0	0	0	2
Best bowling	5/140	2/30	3/10	7/127
Catches/stumpings	4/–	2/–	2/–	40/–
- Source: Cricinfo, 14 April 2025

Brandon Anesu Mavuta (born 4 March 1997) is a Zimbabwean cricketer who plays for the Zimbabwe national cricket team. In January 2016, he was named in Zimbabwe's squad for the 2016 Under-19 Cricket World Cup. He made his international debut for Zimbabwe in July 2018, against Australia, in a Twenty20 International.

== Domestic career ==
Mavuta made his first-class debut on 2 March 2016 in the Logan Cup tournament. He made his Twenty20 debut for Zimbabwe against Eastern Province in the 2016 Africa T20 Cup on 30 September 2016. He made his List A debut for Zimbabwe A against Afghanistan A during Afghanistan's tour to Zimbabwe on 5 February 2017.

Mavuta was the leading wicket-taker in the 2017–18 Logan Cup for Rising Stars, with 27 dismissals in seven matches. He was also the leading wicket-taker in the 2017–18 Pro50 Championship for the Rising Stars, with fifteen dismissals in nine matches. This included taking eight wickets for 38 runs in the final of the tournament, leading the Rising Stars to their first title.

In October 2018, Mavuta was named in Durban Heat's squad for the first edition of the Mzansi Super League T20 tournament. In December 2020, he was selected to play for the Rhinos in the 2020–21 Logan Cup.

== International career ==
In February 2017, Mavuta was named in an academy squad by Zimbabwe Cricket to tour England later that year. In January 2018, he was named in Zimbabwe' One Day International (ODI) squad for the tri-series in Bangladesh, but he did not play.

In June 2018, Mavuta was named in a Board XI team for warm-up fixtures ahead of the 2018 Zimbabwe Tri-Nation Series. Later the same month, he was named in a 22-man preliminary Twenty20 International (T20I) squad for the tri-nation series. He made his T20I debut for Zimbabwe against Australia on 6 July 2018.

In September 2018, Mavuta was named in Zimbabwe's squad for the 2018 Africa T20 Cup tournament. The same month he was once again named in Zimbabwe's ODI squad, this time for the series against South Africa. He made his ODI debut for Zimbabwe against South Africa on 30 September 2018. The same month, he was also named in Zimbabwe's Test squad for their series against Bangladesh. He made his Test debut for Zimbabwe against Bangladesh on 3 November 2018 and took 4 wickets for only 21 runs in the second winnings of his debut.

In December 2023, he was suspended by Zimbabwe Cricket after failing a drugs test. On 25 January 2024, Zimbabwe Cricket announced that Mavuta as well as teammate Wesley Madhevere had been suspended for four months, as well as fined 50% of their salaries for three months, effective from January 2024.
