= Tendai Maruma =

Zimbabwean cricketer (born 1992)

Personal information
- Full name: Tendai Power Maruma
- Born: 24 September 1992 (age 34); Harare, Zimbabwe
- Source: ESPNcricinfo, 7 September 2016

Tendai Maruma (born 24 September 1992) is a Zimbabwean first-class cricketer. He was included in Zimbabwe's squad for the 2016 Africa T20 Cup.
