= Old Hararians =

Cricket ground

Old Hararians Sports Club
- Interactive map of Old Hararians Sports Club

Ground information
- Location: Harare, Zimbabwe
- Country: Zimbabwe
- Coordinates: 17°48′53.49″S 31°01′38.49″E
- Owner: Zimbabwe Cricket
- Operator: Zimbabwe Cricket
- Tenants: Zimbabwe; Mashonaland cricket team Rising Stars

International information
- First men's ODI: 6 March 2018: United Arab Emirates v West Indies
- Last men's ODI: 20 March 2018: Afghanistan v United Arab Emirates
- First women's ODI: 21 November 2021: Bangladesh v Pakistan
- Last women's ODI: 23 November 2021: Ireland v West Indies
- First women's T20I: 5 May 2019: Sierra Leone v Uganda
- Last women's T20I: 11 May 2019: Zimbabwe v Nigeria
- As of 3 September 2020; Source: ESPNcricinfo

Old Hararians Sports Club is a sports club and multi-purpose stadium in Harare, Zimbabwe. The ground is also known as Old Hararians 'B' Field, it is mostly used for cricket matches, and has served as the cricket venue in Zimbabwe since its foundation.

== The venue ==
The 'A' field adjoining the main 'B' field hosted one first-class cricket match in March 1950, when Rhodesia played Transvaal. The ground played host to an ICC Emerging Nations Tournament conducted by the International Cricket Council in 2000 and played host to five matches.

The ground underwent renovation ahead of the 2018 Cricket World Cup Qualifier. The revamps were done to make the ground suitable for hosting international matches.

At the 2018 Cricket World Cup Qualifier, during the playoff matches, Nepal gained One Day International (ODI) status following their match at the ground. On 17 March 2018, the ninth place playoff match between Papua New Guinea and Hong Kong at the Cricket World Cup Qualifier became the 4,000th ODI match to be played.

== International centuries ==
=== One Day International centuries ===
No.	Score	Player	Team	Balls	Opposing team	Date	Result
1	123	Chris Gayle	West Indies	91	United Arab Emirates	6 March 2018	Won
2	127	Shimron Hetmyer	West Indies	93	United Arab Emirates	6 March 2018	Won
3	112*	Rameez Shahzad	United Arab Emirates	107	West Indies	6 March 2018	Lost
4	126	Paul Stirling	Ireland	117	United Arab Emirates	12 March 2018	Won

== Five-wicket hauls ==
=== One Day Internationals ===
Three five wicket hauls in One-Day Internationals have been taken at the venue.

No.	Bowler	Date	Team	Opposing team	Inn	Overs	Runs	Wkts	Econ	Result
1	Jason Holder	6 March 2018	West Indies	United Arab Emirates	2	10	53	5	5.30	Won
2	Carlos Brathwaite	8 March 2018	West Indies	Papua New Guinea	1	10	27	5	2.70	Won
3	Rashid Khan	20 March 2018	Afghanistan	United Arab Emirates	1	9	41	5	4.55	Won

== See also ==
- List of cricket grounds by capacity
- List of One Day International cricket grounds
