= Cephas Zhuwao =

Zimbabwean cricketer

Personal information
- Born: 15 December 1984 (age 41); Harare, Zimbabwe
- Nickname: Mayor
- Batting: Left-handed
- Bowling: Slow left-arm orthodox
- Role: Batsman

International information
- National side: Zimbabwe (2008–2018)
- ODI debut (cap 100): 17 October 2008 v Ireland
- Last ODI: 26 October 2018 v Bangladesh
- T20I debut (cap 18): 11 October 2008 v Canada
- Last T20I: 6 July 2018 v Australia

Domestic team information
- Years: Team
- 2005/06: Mashonaland
- 2006/07–2008/09: Northerns
- 2009/10–2018/19: Mashonaland Eagles
- 2019/20: Mid West Rhinos
- 2020/21–2022/23: Southern Rocks

Career statistics
| Competition | ODI | T20I | FC | LA |
|---|---|---|---|---|
| Matches | 9 | 7 | 59 | 92 |
| Runs scored | 154 | 48 | 2,920 | 2,091 |
| Batting average | 17.11 | 6.85 | 28.62 | 24.89 |
| 100s/50s | 0/0 | 0/0 | 3/19 | 0/10 |
| Top score | 45 | 24 | 265 | 99 |
| Balls bowled | 19 | 2 | 1,399 | 788 |
| Wickets | 0 | 1 | 18 | 23 |
| Bowling average | – | 1.00 | 42.50 | 28.04 |
| 5 wickets in innings | – | 0 | 0 | 0 |
| 10 wickets in match | – | 0 | 0 | 0 |
| Best bowling | – | 1/1 | 3/50 | 3/57 |
| Catches/stumpings | 1/– | 2/– | 27/– | 19/– |
- Source: Cricinfo, 16 June 2023

Cephas Zhuwao (born 15 December 1984) is a Zimbabwean international cricketer. He bats left-handed and bowls slow left arm orthodox spin.

Zhuwao made his first-class debut for Northerns in May 2007, having made his limited-overs debut in January 2006.

Despite having played well against a Pakistan academy side, he was a surprise selection for the Zimbabwean national side in October 2008. He made his International Twenty20 debut in the 2008 Quadrangular Twenty20 Series in Canada against Canada, also playing against Pakistan. Played as an opening batsman, he scored twelve runs in three innings. Even though he bowled just two balls in the tournament, he took the final wicket of the third-place playoff against Canada in a 109-run victory.

Following this tournament, Zhuwao made his One Day International (ODI) debut against Ireland on 17 October 2008 in Nairobi, Kenya. Again opening the innings, he scored 16 runs in a 156-run victory.

In November 2017, he scored his maiden first-class century, batting for Mashonaland Eagles against Mid West Rhinos in the 2017–18 Logan Cup. He finished as the leading run-scorer for the tournament, with 821 runs in seven matches.

In February 2018, almost ten years after his one and only ODI appearance to date, Zhuwao was added to Zimbabwe's squad for the 2018 Cricket World Cup Qualifier. In September 2018, he was named in Zimbabwe's squad for the 2018 Africa T20 Cup tournament. In December 2020, he was selected to play for the Southern Rocks in the 2020–21 Logan Cup.
