= Sifelani Rwaziyeni =

Zimbabwean cricket umpire (born 1983)

Personal information
- Born: 12 April 1983 (age 43)

Umpiring information
- Source: Cricinfo, 4 October 2017

Sifelani Rwaziyeni (born 12 April 1983) is a Zimbabwean cricket umpire. He has stood in domestic matches in the 2016–17 Pro50 Championship and the 2017–18 Logan Cup.
