= Stanley Gogwe =

Zimbabwean cricket umpire (born 1989)

Personal information
- Born: 13 February 1989 (age 37); Harare, Zimbabwe
- Role: Umpire

Umpiring information
- WODIs umpired: 5 (2021–2024)
- WT20Is umpired: 2 (2024)
- Source: Cricinfo, 15 March 2023

Stanley Gogwe (born 13 February 1989) is a Zimbabwean cricket umpire. He has stood in domestic matches in the 2016–17 Pro50 Championship and the 2017–18 Logan Cup.
