= Rising Stars cricket team =

Zimbabwean cricket team

Rising Stars
Personnel
- Captain: Tarisai Musakanda

Team information
- Founded: 2017
- Home ground: Takashinga Cricket Club, Highfield, Harare

The Rising Stars were a Zimbabwean first-class cricket team that was formed in 2017. They played their home matches at Takashinga Cricket Club, Highfield, Harare. The team was founded by Zimbabwe's former Test cricket captain Tatenda Taibu. They played in Zimbabwe's domestic cricket competitions, starting with the 2017–18 Logan Cup.

In October 2017, they lost their opening first-class fixture in the Logan Cup to the Mid West Rhinos by 7 wickets. Despite the loss, Zimbabwe's former captain Brendan Taylor praised the team saying that they have some excellent bowlers and deserve their first-class status. Later the same month, in the third round of fixtures, they won their maiden first-class match, beating Matabeleland Tuskers by 268 runs.

In May 2018, they qualified for the final of the 2017–18 Pro50 Championship, in their first season of competing in the Pro50 Championship tournament, after finishing top in the group stage. In the final, they beat Mountaineers by 144 runs to win their first title, with Tony Munyonga named the player of the series.

However, with Zimbabwe Cricket facing financial issues during the 2017–18 season, it was unlikely that the Rising Stars would take part in the 2018–19 season. In October 2018, it was confirmed that the team would be disbanded, with players distributed between the other four franchise teams in Zimbabwe.

== Squad ==
For the 2017–18 season, the squad contained the following players:

- Tarisai Musakanda (c)
- Faraz Akram
- Eddie Byrom
- Ryan Burl
- Aarsh Jha
- Tinashe Kamunhukamwe
- Rugare Magarira
- William Mashinge
- Brandon Mavuta
- Tony Munyonga
- Taffy Mupariwa
- Ryan Murray
- Blessing Muzarabani
- Richard Ngarava
- Thamsanqa Nunu
- Tendai Nyamayaro
- Mkhululi Nyathi
- Milton Shumba
- Tafadzwa Tsiga (wk)
- Honest Ziwira
