= Faraz Akram =

Zimbabwean cricketer

Personal information
- Full name: Mohammad Faraz Akram
- Born: 3 October 1993 (age 33); Jeddah, Saudi Arabia
- Batting: Left-handed
- Bowling: Right-arm medium
- Role: Bowler

International information
- National side: Zimbabwe
- ODI debut (cap 155): 6 January 2024 v Sri Lanka
- Last ODI: 8 January 2024 v Sri Lanka
- T20I debut (cap 62): 10 November 2020 v Pakistan
- Last T20I: 20 March 2021 v Afghanistan

Domestic team information
- Years: Team
- 2017–2018: Rising Stars
- 2018–present: Mashonaland Eagles
- Source: Cricinfo, 20 March 2021

Faraz Akram (Urdu: فراز اکرم; born 3 October 1993) is a Zimbabwean cricketer. Akram was born in Saudi Arabia to Pakistani parents, and made his international debut for the Zimbabwe cricket team in November 2020.

== Personal life ==
Faraz Akram was born on 3 October 1993 in Jeddah, Saudi Arabia to Pakistani parents. Raised in the Middle East and Pakistan, he moved with his family to Zimbabwe in 2000, where his diplomat father worked at the Pakistani embassy. Akram attended Westridge High School in Harare. He became the second Pakistani-origin player to represent Zimbabwe in international cricket, following Sikander Raza.

== Career ==
He made his first-class debut for Rising Stars in the 2017–18 Logan Cup on 4 October 2017. He made his List A debut for Rising Stars in the 2017–18 Pro50 Championship on 17 April 2018. For the 2018–19 season, Akram moved to the Mashonaland Eagles.

In June 2018, he was named in a Board XI team for warm-up fixtures ahead of the 2018 Zimbabwe Tri-Nation Series. In September 2018, he was named in Zimbabwe's squad for the 2018 Africa T20 Cup tournament. He made his Twenty20 debut for Zimbabwe in the 2018 Africa T20 Cup on 14 September 2018.

In October 2020, he was named in Zimbabwe's squad for their tour of Pakistan. He made his Twenty20 International (T20I) debut for Zimbabwe, against Pakistan, on 10 November 2020.

In December 2020, he was selected to play for the Eagles in the 2020–21 Logan Cup. In May 2021, he was named in Zimbabwe A's squad for their home series against South Africa A.
