= Chamu Chibhabha =

Zimbabwean cricketer

Personal information
- Full name: Chamunorwa Justice Chibhabha
- Born: 6 September 1986 (age 40); Masvingo, Zimbabwe
- Nickname: Cham
- Batting: Right-handed
- Bowling: Right-arm medium
- Role: All-rounder
- Relatives: Julia Chibhabha (sister)

International information
- National side: Zimbabwe (2005–present)
- Test debut (cap 96): 28 July 2016 v New Zealand
- Last Test: 12 February 2023 v West Indies
- ODI debut (cap 88): 31 August 2005 v New Zealand
- Last ODI: 23 January 2023 v Ireland
- ODI shirt no.: 33
- T20I debut (cap 2): 28 November 2006 v Bangladesh
- Last T20I: 10 November 2020 v Pakistan
- T20I shirt no.: 33

Domestic team information
- Years: Team
- 2006–present: Southerns
- 2003–2005: Mashonaland

Career statistics
Competition	ODI	T20I	FC	LA
Matches	109	36	109	245
Runs scored	2,474	667	5,423	6,127
Batting average	23.12	19.05	27.95	26.75
100s/50s	0/16	0/5	7/28	4/38
Top score	99	67	149	155*
Balls bowled	1,679	323	6,751	3,750
Wickets	35	14	124	92
Bowling average	46.60	32.50	30.98	35.32
5 wickets in innings	0	0	2	0
10 wickets in match	0	0	0	0
Best bowling	4/25	3/18	5/66	4/25
Catches/stumpings	34/–	9/–	61/–	80/–
- Source: ESPNcricinfo, 12 February 2023

Chamunorwa Justice "Chamu" Chibhabha (born 9 September 1986) is a Zimbabwean cricketer who bats right-handed and bowls right-arm medium pace. In January 2020, Zimbabwe Cricket named him as the captain of Zimbabwe's One Day International (ODI) and Twenty20 International (T20I) squads on an interim basis.

== Domestic career ==
Chibhabha made his maiden first-class century at Harare against Sri Lanka A. The match was drawn, and he made 40 and 103. In his previous first-class match, against South Africa Academy, he made 98 before being run out.

He was the leading wicket-taker for the Mashonaland Eagles in the 2018–19 Logan Cup, with sixteen dismissals in five matches. In December 2020, he was named as the captain of the Eagles for the 2020–21 Logan Cup.

== Personal life ==
His sister Julia Chibhabha also plays international cricket for the Zimbabwe national women's team. She was captain for Zimbabwe's World Cup qualifiers in Pakistan in November 2007.

== International career ==
Chibhabha made a duck on international debut, against New Zealand during the 2005–06 Videocon Tri–Series. Chibhabha has also played first class matches for Mashonaland, and earned a recall to the national side in April 2006, when the team toured West Indies. In the first ODI, he top scored with 55, but his six overs cost thirty runs, and Zimbabwe lost by five wickets.

Chibhabha showed excellent talent during the Indian tour of Zimbabwe in 2015. He was the highest run scorer in the twenty20 series and Zimbabwe won their first Twenty20 International against India. He top scored in this match with 67 and earned man of the match and man of the series as well.

In July 2016 he was named in Zimbabwe's Test squad for their series against New Zealand. On 28 July 2016 he made his Test debut for Zimbabwe against New Zealand. He played in the most ODIs for Zimbabwe before making his Test debut.

He's also having the joint record for taking the most catches by a substitute fielder in a T20I innings, along with Jeetan Patel, Eoin Morgan, Hashim Amla, Johnson Charles and Jonathan Carter.

In June 2018, he was named in a Board XI team for warm-up fixtures ahead of the 2018 Zimbabwe Tri-Nation Series.

Chibhabha was the last batsman, and the only Zimbabwe player, to be out handled the ball in an international match, before that mode of dismissal was abolished in 2017.

Following an almost two-year absence from Test cricket, Zimbabwe played a two-Test series against West Indies in February 2023, and Chibhabha played his first Test in five and a half years in the First Test.
