= Wellington Masakadza =

Zimbabwean cricketer (born 1993)

Personal information
- Full name: Wellington Pedzisai Masakadza
- Born: 4 October 1993 (age 33); Harare, Zimbabwe
- Batting: Left-handed
- Bowling: Slow left-arm orthodox
- Role: Bowler
- Relatives: Hamilton Masakadza (brother); Shingi Masakadza (brother)

International information
- National side: Zimbabwe (2015–present)
- Test debut (cap 106): 3 November 2018 v Bangladesh
- Last Test: 6 July 2025 v South Africa
- ODI debut (cap 127): 9 October 2015 v Ireland
- Last ODI: 18 September 2026 v Australia
- ODI shirt no.: 11
- T20I debut (cap 43): 26 October 2015 v Afghanistan
- Last T20I: 9 February 2026 v Oman
- T20I shirt no.: 11

Domestic team information
- Years: Team
- 2013/14–: Mountaineers
- 2014/15: Mashonaland Eagles

Career statistics
Competition	Test	ODI	T20I	FC
Matches	7	42	75	65
Runs scored	159	243	259	1,847
Batting average	13.25	11.04	8.63	20.98
100s/50s	0/1	0/0	0/0	0/12
Top score	57	40	34	88
Balls bowled	1,381	1,751	1,282	11,168
Wickets	19	33	48	206
Bowling average	41.57	43.12	32.75	25.84
5 wickets in innings	0	0	0	8
10 wickets in match	0	0	0	1
Best bowling	4/98	4/21	4/11	6/41
Catches/stumpings	5/–	13/–	34/–	43/–
- Source: ESPNcricinfo, 2 January 2026

Wellington Pedzisai Masakadza (born 4 October 1993) is a Zimbabwean cricketer who has played first-class and limited overs matches for the Mountaineers and the Mashonaland Eagles. He made his One Day International debut against Ireland on 9 October 2015, and his Twenty20 International debut against Afghanistan on 26 October 2015.

== Domestic career ==
From Harare, Masakadza is the youngest of three brothers who have each played cricket at high levels – the others are Hamilton Masakadza (born 1983) and Shingirai Masakadza (born 1986), who have both played Test cricket for Zimbabwe's national side. A left-handed batsman and slow left-arm orthodox spinner, Wellington Masakadza represented the Zimbabwean under-19s at the 2012 Under-19 World Cup, playing in three matches. He made his senior debut for the Mountaineers franchise during the 2013–14 domestic season, having performed well in four trial Twenty20 games played prior to the start of the season.

Masakadza went on to play five matches in the 2013–14 Logan Cup, taking 15 wickets. This included figures of 5/63 on his first-class debut, against the Matabeleland Tuskers. In September 2014, he was selected for the Zimbabwe A that toured Bangladesh, playing in two first-class and three one-day games. Masakadza took 6/63 in the first of those matches, his best figures. He subsequently selected in the Zimbabwean senior team's 17-man Test squad for its tour of Bangladesh in October and December, along with both of his brothers, although he did not participate in any of the Tests. For the 2014–15 Zimbabwean season, Masakadza switched to play for the Mashonaland Eagles.

In December 2020, he was selected to play for the Mountaineers in the 2020–21 Logan Cup.

== International career ==
He made his One Day International debut for Zimbabwe against Ireland on 9 October 2015, but could not do impact on the series. During the Afghanistan tour of Zimbabwe, he took 4 for 21 runs, finally Zimbabwe won the match convincingly by 8 wickets. Masakadza was adjudged as the man of the match.

In September 2018, he was named in Zimbabwe's Test squad for their series against Bangladesh. He made his Test debut for Zimbabwe against Bangladesh on 3 November 2018.
