= Richmond Mutumbami =

Zimbabwean cricketer (born 1989)

Personal information
- Full name: Richmond Mutumbami
- Born: 11 June 1989 (age 37); Masvingo, Zimbabwe
- Batting: Right-handed
- Bowling: Right-arm off break
- Role: Wicket-keeper

International information
- National side: Zimbabwe
- Test debut (cap 89): 17 April 2013 v Bangladesh
- Last Test: 12 November 2014 v Bangladesh
- ODI debut (cap 119): 24 July 2014 v Afghanistan
- Last ODI: 6 March 2020 v Bangladesh
- ODI shirt no.: 89
- T20I debut (cap 38): 22 May 2015 v Pakistan
- Last T20I: 24 May 2022 v Namibia
- T20I shirt no.: 89

Domestic team information
- Years: Team
- 2006-2008: Southerns
- 2006/07: Westerns
- 2006-2009: Masvingo
- 2008/09: Centrals
- 2009-2013: Southern Rocks

Career statistics
Competition	Test	ODI	FC	LA
Matches	6	36	96	133
Runs scored	217	618	5,123	2,659
Batting average	19.72	19.31	33.92	22.72
100s/50s	0/0	0/3	6/31	0/15
Top score	43	74	156	99
Catches/stumpings	17/2	24/5	173/12	112/14
- Source: Cricinfo, 24 May 2022

Richmond Mutumbami (born 11 June 1989) is a Zimbabwean cricketer. A wicket-keeper batsman, Mutumbami made his first-class debut as a 17-year-old against Southerns in April 2007. Six years later, in April 2013, he made his international debut in a Test match against Bangladesh. He made his Twenty20 International debut against Pakistan in May 2015.

== Domestic career ==
He was the leading run-scorer in the 2017–18 Logan Cup for Matabeleland Tuskers, with 442 runs in seven matches. He was the leading run-scorer for the Mashonaland Eagles in the 2018–19 Logan Cup, with 291 runs in four matches. In December 2020, he was named as the captain of the Southern Rocks for the 2020–21 Logan Cup.

== International career ==
Mutumbami was named in the 21-Member squad for the Bangladeshi tour in April 2013. He made his test debut against Bangladesh in April 2013. He scored a quick-fire 11 runs 13 balls with 2 fours and took his first dismissal as wicketkeeper in both international cricket and Test cricket catching Nasir Hossain off Kyle Jarvis in the Bangladesh's first innings.

Although he was out for a first-ball duck in the second innings, he had a better show behind the stumps catching Jahurul Islam off Shingi Masakadza and stumping Sohag Gazi off Graeme Cremer, his first stumping in both International and Test Cricket. Zimbabwe went on to win the test by 335 runs.

In the second test, Mutumbami took two catches in the Bangladeshi innings. In the Zimbabwean first innings he went on to take his current career best of 42 runs 72 balls 3 fours and a six. He had an 85 run stand with Elton Chigumbura. In Bangladesh's Second Innings he took three catches and a stumping but scored 12 when he came out to bat again and Zimbabwe lost the Match by 143 runs.

In August 2014, Mutumbami made 73 for Zimbabwe A in the second tour match against Afghan because of these he was included in Zimbabwe ODI squad for last two ODI against Afghanistan. He scored 64 runs on his debut in 100 runs lost against Afghanistan at Harare Sports Club.

Mutumbami opened in the three ODIs against South Africa, but only made scores of 13, 12 and 0, after which he was moved down to No.7 for the game against Australia. He did not find much luck there either making only 11 as Zimbabwe's need to bulk up their batting grew more pressing and was ruled out after being hit by a ball during nets and he sustained a hairline fracture to a bone in his right forearm.

Mutumbami was included in the ODI series against Afghanistan, and returned to opening the batting. He was not successful in first two games, but in the third ODI, he scored 74 from 92 balls, helping the team to victory and lead the series 2–1.

In September 2018, he was named in Zimbabwe's squad for the 2018 Africa T20 Cup tournament.
