= Donald Tiripano =

Zimbabwean cricketer

Personal information
- Full name: Donald Tatenda Tiripano
- Born: 17 March 1988 (age 38); Mutare, Zimbabwe
- Batting: Right-handed
- Bowling: Right-arm medium-fast
- Role: Bowler
- Relatives: Chipo Mugeri-Tiripano (wife)

International information
- National side: Zimbabwe (2014-present)
- Test debut (cap 92): 9 August 2014 v South Africa
- Last Test: 12 February 2023 v West Indies
- ODI debut (cap 118): 18 July 2014 v Afghanistan
- Last ODI: 6 June 2022 v Afghanistan
- ODI shirt no.: 25
- T20I debut (cap 45): 8 January 2016 v Afghanistan
- Last T20I: 14 June 2022 v Afghanistan
- T20I shirt no.: 25

Domestic team information
- Years: Team
- 2009/10–: Mountaineers
- 2008/09: Easterns

Career statistics
Competition	Test	ODI	T20I	FC
Matches	16	38	23	98
Runs scored	531	364	157	3,097
Batting average	22.12	17.33	13.08	26.02
100s/50s	0/2	0/1	0/0	4/12
Top score	95	55*	28	121
Balls bowled	2,693	1,508	417	14,668
Wickets	26	36	16	279
Bowling average	48.96	40.44	38.56	25.89
5 wickets in innings	0	1	0	6
10 wickets in match	0	0	0	0
Best bowling	3/23	5/63	3/20	5/15
Catches/stumpings	5/–	5/0	4/0	33/–
- Source: Cricinfo, 12 February 2023

Donald Tatenda Tiripano (born 17 March 1988) is a Zimbabwean cricketer, who plays for the national team. He is a right-arm fast bowler and tail-ended batsman.

== Domestic career ==
Tiripano was the leading run-scorer in the 2017–18 Logan Cup for Mountaineers, with 678 runs in eight matches. He was the leading wicket-taker in the 2018–19 Logan Cup, with 25 dismissals in six matches. In December 2020, he was selected to play for the Mountaineers in the 2020–21 Logan Cup.

== International career ==
He was named in the Zimbabwe squad for Afghanistan tour of Zimbabwe. He made his One Day International (ODI) debut at Queens Sports Club against Afghanistan where he took 2/51, as Zimbabwe won by 6 wickets.

In his third ODI, Tiripano's 5/63 in 10 overs against Afghanistan at Queens Sports Club was not enough to clinch victory for Zimbabwe as they lost by 100 runs. He took wickets of Javed Ahmadi, Usman Ghani, Shafiqullah, Mirwais Ashraf and Aftab Alam.

He was named in Zimbabwean Test squad for one-off Test against South Africa and made his Test debut at Harare Sports Club in August 2014 where he took scored unbeaten 15 and then with bat and took two wickets of Dean Elgar and another debutant Dane Piedt.

He made his Twenty20 International debut for Zimbabwe against Afghanistan on 8 January 2016.

== Personal life ==
Tiripano is married to Chipo Mugeri-Tiripano, who has captained the Zimbabwean women's team. They have a daughter together.
