= Regis Chakabva =

Zimbabwean cricketer (born 1987)

Personal information
- Full name: Regis Wiriranai Chakabva
- Born: 20 September 1987 (age 39); Harare, Zimbabwe
- Height: 5 ft 10 in (1.78 m)
- Batting: Right-handed
- Bowling: Right-arm off break
- Role: Wicket-keeper-batter

International information
- National side: Zimbabwe (2008–2022)
- Test debut (cap 80): 1 November 2011 v New Zealand
- Last Test: 7 July 2021 v Bangladesh
- ODI debut (cap 101): 19 October 2008 v Kenya
- Last ODI: 3 September 2022 v Australia
- ODI shirt no.: 5
- T20I debut (cap 19): 12 October 2008 v Pakistan
- Last T20I: 6 November 2022 v India
- T20I shirt no.: 5

Domestic team information
- Years: Team
- 2006/07–2008/09: Northerns
- 2009/11–: Mashonaland Eagles

Career statistics
| Competition | Test | ODI | T20I | FC |
|---|---|---|---|---|
| Matches | 22 | 53 | 33 | 121 |
| Runs scored | 1061 | 953 | 494 | 7,046 |
| Batting average | 27.20 | 20.27 | 15.93 | 35.58 |
| 100s/50s | 1/5 | 0/4 | 0/0 | 16/31 |
| Top score | 101 | 84 | 48 | 240 |
| Catches/stumpings | 46/5 | 48/5 | 18/1 | 283/22 |
- Source: Cricinfo, 6 November 2022

Regis Wiriranai Chakabva (born 20 September 1987) is a Zimbabwean cricketer and Former vice-captain of the team in all formats of the game. He is a right-handed wicket-keeper batter. He played through school-level cricket and started making his mark as a good batter with sound wicket-keeping abilities. He got picked to play for Zimbabwe.

== Domestic career ==
Chakabva made his first-class debut for Northerns in an April 2007 Logan Cup match against Easterns. Opening the batting, he made scores of 0 and 5 in the match. After just four first-class matches for his province and with a top score of 35, he was picked for a Zimbabwe A side. He made his first half-century against a South African academy side in August 2007. Chakabva was then selected for a Zimbabwe Provinces side to play in South African domestic competition in the 2007–08 season; he made his maiden first-class century against Namibia in this tournament. In 2013/2014, he played grade cricket for Magpies Cricket Club in Mackay, Queensland.

In December 2020, he was selected to play for the Eagles in the 2020–21 Logan Cup.

== International career ==
In October 2008, Chakabva was selected in the squad for the Zimbabwe national team for the 2008 Quadrangular Twenty20 Series in Canada. He made his international debut in a Twenty20 International match against Pakistan on 12 October 2008. Playing as a specialist batsman (Tatenda Taibu was the wicket-keeper) he scored one run before being run out. Pakistan won the match by seven wickets. Zimbabwe would go on to finish third in the tournament.

After this tournament, the Zimbabwe side went to Nairobi, Kenya, for a series of One Day International matches against Kenya and Ireland. Chakabva made his One Day International debut against Kenya on 19 October, this time as wicket-keeper with Taibu playing as a specialist batsman. Chakabva scored 41 runs from 44 balls and was the last wicket to fall as Zimbabwe lost by 95 runs.

In 2010, Chakabva toured Canada and the Netherlands with the Zimbabwean side. Following the readmission of Zimbabwe to Test cricket in 2011, he made his Test debut against New Zealand at Bulawayo in November that year, keeping wicket and scoring 37 and 5 batting at number seven.

Chakabva scored his maiden Test century on 3 July 2014 against Bangladesh at Khulna. However, Zimbabwe lost the match.

In 2021, Chakabva was made the vice-captain of the Zimbabwe side.

In 2022, he began his service as the vice-captain of the Test side as well. Later in 2022, Regis Chakabva captained Zimbabwe for the first time against Bangladesh and started with a win.

Regis has been inconsistent in his batting since his career has been affected by the lack of playing opportunities. He has, however, improved as a wicket-keeper over the years and is quite secure behind the stumps.
