= 2016–17 Logan Cup =

Cricket tournament

- Dates: 18 December 2016 – 20 May 2017
- Administrator: Zimbabwe Cricket
- Cricket format: First-class cricket (4 days)
- Tournament format: League system
- Champions: Mountaineers (2nd title)
- Participants: 4
- Matches: 36
- Most runs: Kevin Kasuza (446)
- Most wickets: Natsai Mushangwe (24)

The 2016–17 Logan Cup was the 23rd edition of the Logan Cup, a first-class cricket competition in Zimbabwe. It was held between December 2016 and May 2017. Mountaineers won the tournament, following a draw against Mashonaland Eagles in round 8 of the competition.

Originally, the tournament was scheduled to be played across twelve rounds, with each team playing each other four times. However, the start of the tournament was postponed because of logistical challenges, with the opening matches rescheduled to take place a week later than originally planned.

The opening fixture between Mid West Rhinos and Matabeleland Tuskers was interrupted at the start of day three with a strike by the players. The protest was led by domestic players, as they had not been paid in November. Matabeleland Tuskers forfeited the second innings of the match, and therefore Mid West Rhinos won the game. The second round of fixtures, originally scheduled to start on 5 January 2017, were postponed as some players still had not been paid. On 12 January 2017 Zimbabwe Cricket announced that the competition had been postponed again, with a scheduled restart in mid-February. The next day, Zimbabwe Cricket issued a press release stating that all players had now been paid and that the tournament would restart on 17 January 2017. However, both fixtures scheduled to start on this date were abandoned due to rain.

The matches originally scheduled to start on 7 February 2017 were further postponed because of Zimbabwe's domestic List A tournament, the 2016–17 Pro50 Championship. This competition was originally scheduled to start in May, but the opening fixtures were brought forward in preparation for Zimbabwe's One Day International (ODI) series against Afghanistan. The tournament restarted on 21 February 2017.

== Point table ==
The following teams competed:

Team	Pld	W	L	D	A	Pts
Mountaineers	9	4	0	3	2	39
Mid West Rhinos	9	3	3	2	1	22
Mashonaland Eagles	9	1	2	4	2	20
Matabeleland Tuskers	9	1	4	3	1	12

Champions

== Fixtures ==
=== Round 1 ===
18–21 December 2016
Scorecard

Mountaineers	v	Mashonaland Eagles

Match abandoned
Mutare Sports Club, Mutare
Umpires: Iknow Chabi and Langton Rusere

- No toss.
- No play was possible due to rain and a wet outfield.

18–21 December 2016
Scorecard

Mid West Rhinos	v	Matabeleland Tuskers
323 (84.1 overs); Graeme Cremer 144 (227); Brian Vitori 4/66 (16.1 overs)		112 (48.1 overs); Brian Chari 30 (61); Graeme Cremer 4/16 (7.1 overs)
64/4d (19.1 overs); Prince Masvaure 26 (27); Brian Vitori 3/34 (8 overs)		68/1d (16.1 overs); Sean Williams 47* (39); Tendai Chisoro 1/38 (5 overs)

Mid West Rhinos won by 207 runs
Queens Sports Club, Bulawayo
Umpires: Owen Chirombe and Christopher Phiri

- Matabeleland Tuskers won the toss and elected to field.
- Mid West Rhinos won the match after Matabeleland Tuskers forfeited their second innings in a protest over players' salaries.

=== Round 2 ===
17–20 January 2017
Scorecard

Mashonaland Eagles	v	Mid West Rhinos

Match abandoned
Harare Sports Club, Harare
Umpires: Iknow Chabi and Langton Rusere

- No toss.
- No play was possible due to rain.

17–20 January 2017
Scorecard

Mountaineers	v	Matabeleland Tuskers

Match abandoned
Mutare Sports Club, Mutare
Umpires: Owen Chirombe and Ashby Mutumbami

- No toss.
- No play was possible due to rain.

=== Round 3 ===
21–24 February 2017
Scorecard

Mid West Rhinos	v	Mashonaland Eagles
224 (77.2 overs); Bothwell Chapungu 58 (84); Tanyaradzwa Munyaradzi 4/40 (18 overs)		272 (62.4 overs); Cephas Zhuwao 55 (53); Michael Chinouya 5/25 (12.4 overs)
51/3 (17 overs); Bothwell Chapungu 37 (43); Trevor Garwe 2/1 (5 overs)

Match drawn
Kwekwe Sports Club, Kwekwe
Umpires: Owen Chirombe and Stanley Gogwe

- Mid West Rhinos won the toss and elected to bat.
- The match was abandoned on day 3 due to a water-logged outfield.
- Takudzwanashe Kaitano (Mid West Rhinos) made his first-class debut.

21–24 February 2017
Scorecard

Matabeleland Tuskers	v	Mountaineers
148 (57.2 overs); Charles Kunje 49 (109); William Mashinge 5/23 (11.2 overs)		13/1 (5 overs); Kevin Kasuza 8* (19); Brian Vitori 1/12 (3 overs)

Match drawn
Bulawayo Athletic Club, Bulawayo
Umpires: Christopher Phiri and Russell Tiffin

- Mountaineers won the toss and elected to field.
- The match was abandoned on day 3 due to a water-logged outfield.

=== Round 4 ===
4–7 March 2017
Scorecard

Mashonaland Eagles	v	Matabeleland Tuskers
299/8 (83.2 overs); Tinotenda Mutombodzi 87 (129); Thabo Mboyi 3/23 (12.2 overs)

Match drawn
Country Club, Harare
Umpires: Iknow Chabi and Jeremiah Matibiri

- Mashonaland Eagles won the toss and elected to bat.
- No play was possible on day 1 due to rain and on days 3 & 4 due to a wet outfield.

4–7 March 2017
Scorecard

Mountaineers	v	Mid West Rhinos
370 (129.5 overs); Kevin Kasuza 97 (183); Tendai Chisoro 6/145 (43.5 overs)		302 (93.3 overs); Tarisai Musakanda 66 (67); Donald Tiripano 3/48 (20 overs)
238/5d (73.2 overs); Timycen Maruma 48 (55); Tendai Chisoro 2/102 (31 overs)		1/0 (0.5 overs); Bothwell Chapungu 1* (3)

Match drawn
Kwekwe Sports Club, Kwekwe
Umpires: Stanley Gogwe and Langton Rusere

- Mid West Rhinos won the toss and elected to field.

=== Round 5 ===
22–25 March 2017
Scorecard

Mashonaland Eagles	v	Matabeleland Tuskers
379 (112 overs); Tinotenda Mutombodzi 86 (158); John Nyumbu 4/101 (28 overs)		103 (41.3 overs); Nkosana Mpofu 29 (58); Nathan Waller 5/29 (10 overs)
		191 (68.2 overs) (f/o); Brian Chari 52 (115); Trevor Garwe 3/40 (14.2 overs)

Mashonaland Eagles won by an innings and 85 runs
Harare Sports Club, Harare
Umpires: Iknow Chabi and Owen Chirombe

- Mashonaland Eagles won the toss and elected to bat.

22–25 March 2017
Scorecard

Mid West Rhinos	v	Mountaineers
123 (34.2 overs); Bothwell Chapungu 22 (27); Natsai M'shangwe 3/20 (6.2 overs)		317 (105.1 overs); Hamilton Masakadza 94 (167); Carl Mumba 4/92 (27 overs)
268 (78.1 overs); Malcolm Waller 112 (160); Timycen Maruma 4/48 (10 overs)		78/3 (14.2 overs); Timycen Maruma 51* (23); Carl Mumba 1/18 (4 overs)

Mountaineers won by 7 wickets
Kwekwe Sports Club, Kwekwe
Umpires: Stanley Gogwe and Josphat Mutapure

- Mid West Rhinos won the toss and elected to bat.

=== Round 6 ===
4–7 April 2017
Scorecard

Mashonaland Eagles	v	Mid West Rhinos
92 (35.1 overs); Gary Chirimuuta 17 (25); Graeme Cremer 4/22 (6.1 overs)		195 (53.1 overs); Bothwell Chapungu 63 (56); Jalat Khan 4/64 (21 overs)
111 (45.2 overs); Gary Chirimuuta 27 (63); Brandon Mavuta 3/11 (4.2 overs)		9/1 (1.5 overs); Brandon Mavuta 8 (5); Jalat Khan 1/8 (1 over)

Mid West Rhinos won by 9 wickets
Kwekwe Sports Club, Kwekwe
Umpires: Stanley Gogwe and Josphat Mutapure

- Mashonaland Eagles won the toss and elected to bat.

4–7 April 2017
Scorecard

Mountaineers	v	Matabeleland Tuskers
206 (62.3 overs); Tino Mawoyo 46 (119); Ainsley Ndlovu 6/47 (18.3 overs)		228 (83.5 overs); Charles Kunje 100 (160); Tendai Chatara 2/46 (19.5 overs)
264 (108.4 overs); Forster Mutizwa 79 (212); Steve Chimhamhiwa 3/39 (19.4 overs)		160 (60.2 overs); Charles Kunje 48 (49); Wellington Masakadza 3/43 (17 overs)

Mountaineers won by 82 runs
Bulawayo Athletic Club, Bulawayo
Umpires: Jeremiah Matibiri and Lucky Ngwenya

- Mountaineers won the toss and elected to bat.

=== Round 7 ===
20–23 April 2017
Scorecard

Mashonaland Eagles	v	Matabeleland Tuskers
187 (62.3 overs); Ryan Burl 62 (95); Luke Jongwe 5/44 (16 overs)		282 (93 overs); Sean Williams 106 (119); Taurai Muzarabani 3/38 (18 overs)
532/4d (130.3 overs); Ryan Burl 151 (179); Luke Jongwe 2/108 (24 overs)		153/3 (47 overs); Charles Kunje 72* (89); Taurai Muzarabani 1/16 (6 overs)

Match drawn
Queens Sports Club, Bulawayo
Umpires: Christopher Phiri and Langton Rusere

- Mashonaland Eagles won the toss and elected to bat.

20–23 April 2017
Scorecard

Mid West Rhinos	v	Mountaineers
131 (50.1 overs); Peter Moor 58 (105); Shingi Masakadza 5/52 (17.1 overs)		327 (100.2 overs); Timycen Maruma 87 (168); James Bruce 4/37 (17 overs)
283 (85.4 overs); Prince Masvaure 69 (117); Natsai M'shangwe 8/91 (28.4 overs)		92/1 (14.4 overs); Vusi Sibanda 52* (36); James Bruce 1/10 (4 overs)

Mountaineers won by 9 wickets
Mutare Sports Club, Mutare
Umpires: Iknow Chabi and Owen Chirombe

- Mid West Rhinos won the toss and elected to bat.
- James Bruce (Mid West Rhinos) made his first-class debut.

=== Round 8 ===
6–9 May 2017
Scorecard

Mashonaland Eagles	v	Mountaineers
231 (87 overs); Kudzai Maunze 51 (130); William Mashinge 4/65 (17 overs)		281 (85 overs); Kevin Kasuza 86 (154); Taurai Muzarabani 3/40 (19 overs)
312/8d (97 overs); Kudzai Maunze 150* (242); Clive Chitumba 4/38 (10 overs)		168/3 (58 overs); Forster Mutizwa 79 (158); Kudzai Maunze 1/21 (7 overs)

Match drawn
Harare Sports Club, Harare
Umpires: Iknow Chabi and Langton Rusere

- Mashonaland Eagles won the toss and elected to bat.
- Brendon Timoni (Mashonaland Eagles) and Clive Chitumba (Mountaineers) both made their first-class debuts.

6–9 May 2017
Scorecard

Mid West Rhinos	v	Matabeleland Tuskers
282 (83.2 overs); Tendai Maruma 86 (118); Chris Mpofu 5/81 (23 overs)		204 (72.2 overs); Luke Jongwe 53 (99); Graeme Cremer 4/45 (22.2 overs)
338/4d (87.5 overs); Prince Masvaure 123* (164); Chris Mpofu 2/29 (15 overs)		196 (66.3 overs); Shoun Handirisi 44 (98); Graeme Cremer 4/75 (22.3 overs)

Mid West Rhinos won by 220 runs
Queens Sports Club, Bulawayo
Umpires: Christopher Phiri and Russell Tiffin

- Matabeleland Tuskers won the toss and elected to field.
- Sheunopa Musekwa (Matabeleland Tuskers) and Tafara Chingwara (Mid West Rhinos) both made their first-class debuts.

=== Round 9 ===
17–20 May 2017
Scorecard

Mountaineers	v	Mashonaland Eagles
319 (94.2 overs); Tino Mawoyo 122 (209); Cuthbert Musoko 4/59 (19 overs)		211 (73 overs); Brendon Timoni 40 (70); Tafadzwa Kamungozi 4/30 (13 overs)
258 (73 overs); Kevin Kasuza 104 (200); Gerald Aliseni 3/28 (10 overs)		213 (70.3 overs); Cephas Zhuwao 62 (52); Tafadzwa Kamungozi 6/43 (23 overs)

Mountaineers won by 153 runs
Mutare Sports Club, Mutare
Umpires: Owen Chirombe and Walter Musakwa

- Mashonaland Eagles won the toss and elected to field.

17–20 May 2017
Scorecard

Matabeleland Tuskers	v	Mid West Rhinos
256 (94.2 overs); Richmond Mutumbami 81 (142); Michael Chinouya 4/45 (20 overs)		207 (45.3 overs); Prince Masvaure 93 (102); Ernest Masuku 4/63 (13 overs)
189 (65 overs); Richmond Mutumbami 69 (116); Prince Masvaure 4/44 (13 overs)		135 (35.4 overs); Prince Masvaure 34 (55); Thabo Mboyi 5/36 (11.4 overs)

Matabeleland Tuskers won by 103 runs
Kwekwe Sports Club, Kwekwe
Umpires: Stanley Gogwe and Josphat Mutapure

- Mid West Rhinos won the toss and elected to field.
- Mduduzi Fuzwayo, Ernest Masuku (Matabeleland Tuskers) and Manson Chikowero (Mid West Rhinos) all made their first-class debuts.
