= 2015–16 Pro50 Championship =

Fourteenth edition of the Pro50, a cricket tournament in Zimbabwe

- Dates: 4 November 2015 – 6 January 2016
- Administrator: Zimbabwe Cricket
- Cricket format: List A cricket
- Tournament format: Round-robin
- Champions: Mashonaland Eagles (4th title)
- Participants: 4
- Matches: 12
- Most runs: Prince Masvaure (250)
- Most wickets: Tawanda Mupariwa (13)

The 2015–16 Pro50 Championship was the fourteenth edition of the Pro50 Championship, a List A cricket tournament in Zimbabwe. The competition ran from 4 November 2015 to 6 January 2016. In a change from the previous edition, teams played each other twice (instead of three times) during the round-robin, and there was no final.

Mashonaland Eagles won the tournament for the fourth time, with five victories and one defeat.

Mid West Rhinos batsman Prince Masvaure was the tournament's leading run-scorer with a total of 250 runs. Matabeleland Tuskers bowler Tawanda Mupariwa was the leading wicket-tacker with a total of 13 wickets.

== Points table ==
| Pos | Team | Pld | W | L | T | NR | BP | Pts | NRR |
|---|---|---|---|---|---|---|---|---|---|
| 1 | Mashonaland Eagles (C) | 6 | 5 | 0 | 0 | 1 | 3 | 25 | 1.099 |
| 2 | Mountaineers | 6 | 3 | 2 | 0 | 1 | 1 | 15 | 0.136 |
| 3 | Matabeleland Tuskers | 6 | 2 | 4 | 0 | 0 | 0 | 8 | −0.911 |
| 4 | Mid West Rhinos | 6 | 1 | 5 | 0 | 0 | 1 | 5 | 0.013 |

(C) Champions

== Fixtures ==
=== Round-robin ===
4 November 2015
Scorecard

| Mashonaland Eagles; 265/7 (50 overs) | v | Mid West Rhinos; 198 (44.3 overs) |
| Joylord Gumbie 80 (94); Richard Muzhange 4/32 (10 overs) | | Remembrance Nyathi 49 (59); Sikandar Raza 2/24 (5.5 overs) |

Mashonaland Eagles won by 67 runs
Kwekwe Sports Club, Kwekwe
Umpires: Stanley Gogwe and Christopher Phiri

- Mid West Rhinos won the toss and elected to field.
- Brandon Diplock and Brighton Zhawi (Mashonaland Eagles) made their List A debuts.

4 November 2015
Scorecard

| Mountaineers; 161 (37.3 overs) | v | Matabeleland Tuskers; 130 (36.4 overs) |
| Roy Kaia 59 (90); Tawanda Mupariwa 6/52 (9 overs) | | Mbekezeli Mabuza 26* (41); Cuthbert Musoko 5/19 (8.4 overs) |

Mountaineers won by 31 runs
Mutare Sports Club, Mutare
Umpires: Iknow Chabi and Langton Rusere

- Matabeleland Tuskers won the toss and elected to field.
- Taffy Mupariwa and Kyle Bowie (Matabeleland Tuskers) made their List A debuts.

11 November 2015
Scorecard

| Mountaineers; 167 (48.2 overs) | v | Mashonaland Eagles; 171/5 (33.2 overs) |
| Innocent Kaia 52 (67); Herbert Chikomba 5/36 (10 overs) | | Cephas Zhuwao 71 (64); Tatenda Mupunga 2/28 (8.2 overs) |

Mashonaland Eagles won by 5 wickets
Old Hararians, Harare
Umpires: Iknow Chabi and Walter Musakwa

- Mountaineers won the toss and elected to bat.
- Craig Dollar and Herbert Chikomba (Mashonaland Eagles) made their List A debuts.

11 November 2015
Scorecard

| Mid West Rhinos; 230/7 (50 overs) | v | Matabeleland Tuskers; 232/4 (48.4 overs) |
| Tarisai Musakanda 82 (118); Mbekezeli Mabuza 3/22 (5 overs) | | Mbekezeli Mabuza 87 (121); Carl Mumba 2/51 (10 overs) |

Matabeleland Tuskers won by 6 wickets
Kwekwe Sports Club, Kwekwe
Umpires: Langton Rusere and Lucky Ngwenya

- Matabeleland Tuskers won the toss and elected to bat.
- Deven Bell (Matabeleland Tuskers) made his List A debut.

23 November 2015
Scorecard

| Matabeleland Tuskers; 227/9 (50 overs) | v | Mashonaland Eagles; 226 (46 overs) |
| Mbekezeli Mabuza 39 (47); Chamu Chibhabha 1/14 (5 overs) | | Regis Chakabva 61 (81); Tinotenda Mutombodzi 61 (64); Tawanda Mupariwa 2/23 (8 overs) |

Mashonaland Eagles won by 4 wickets (D/L method)
Old Hararians, Harare
Umpires: Stanley Gogwe and Owen Chirombe

- Matabeleland Tuskers won the toss and elected to bat.

23 November 2015
Scorecard

| Mountaineers; 242/4 (50 overs) | v | Mid West Rhinos; 224 (48.1 overs) |
| Timycen Maruma 69* (69); Tinashe Panyangara 1/32 (9 overs) | | Prince Masvaure 91 (111); Donald Tiripano 5/47 (10 overs) |

Mountaineers won by 18 runs
Kwekwe Sports Club, Kwekwe
Umpires: Sifelani Rwaziyeni and Iknow Chabi

- Mid West Rhinos won the toss and elected to field.

3 December 2015
Scorecard

| Mashonaland Eagles; 259/7 (50 overs) | v | Mid West Rhinos; 236 (43.5 overs) |
| Chamu Chibhabha 101 (131); Tendai Chisoro 2/23 (10 overs) | | Tendai Chisoro 52 (50); Trevor Garwe 4/52 (8.5 overs) |

Mashonaland Eagles won by 23 runs
Country Club, Harare
Umpires: Sifelani Rwaziyeni and Langton Rusere

- Mid West Rhinos won the toss and elected to field.

3 December 2015
Scorecard

| Matabeleland Tuskers; 251/5 (50 overs) | v | Mountaineers; 78 (29 overs) |
| Vusi Sibanda 64 (97); Brian Vitori 2/42 (10 overs) | | Nkosana Mpofu 18 (27); Tapiwa Mufudza 5/25 (9 overs) |

Mountaineers won by 173 runs
Queens Sports Club, Bulawayo
Umpires: Russell Tiffin and Lucky Ngwenya

- Matabeleland Tuskers won the toss and elected to bat.

12 December 2015
Scorecard

| Mountaineers; 246/2 (40.4 overs) | v | Mashonaland Eagles; 176/2 (17.4 overs) |
| Vusi Sibanda 86* (71); Cephas Zhuwao 1/29 (4 overs) | | Cephas Zhuwao 77* (42); Victor Nyauchi 1/10 (2 overs) |

No result
Mutare Sports Club, Mutare
Umpires: Iknow Chabi and Jeremiah Matibiri

- Mashonaland Eagles won the toss and elected to field.
- Rain caused the Mountaineers innings to be ended after 40.2 overs. Mashonaland Eagles were set a revised DLS target of 220 runs from 28 overs, but their chase was ended by bad light after 17.4 overs.

13 December 2015
Scorecard

| Matabeleland Tuskers; 249/8 (50 overs) | v | Mid West Rhinos; 244/3 (49.5 overs) |
| Richmond Mutumbami 64 (64); Tendai Chisoro 2/34 (10 overs) | | Prince Masvaure 75 (88); Mbekezeli Mabuza 3/44 (10 overs) |

Matabeleland Tuskers won by 5 runs
Bulawayo Athletic Club, Bulawayo
Umpires: Stanley Gogwe and Owen Chirombe

- Matabeleland Tuskers won the toss and elected to bat.

5 January 2016
Scorecard

| Mountaineers; 223/9 (50 overs) | v | Mid West Rhinos; 98 (28.5 overs) |
| James Bruce 63* (58); Tapiwa Mufudza 3/19 (10 overs) | | Kudzai Sauramba 17 (37); Prince Masvaure 3/25 (8 overs) |

Mid West Rhinos won by 125 runs
Mutare Sports Club, Mutare
Umpires: Russell Tiffin and Ashby Mutumbami

- Mid West Rhinos won the toss and elected to bat.
- James Bruce (Mid West Rhinos) made his List A debut.

6 January 2016
Scorecard

| Matabeleland Tuskers; 240/9 (50 overs) | v | Mashonaland Eagles; 244/5 (36.4 overs) |
| Bonaparte Mujuru 107* (151); Tafadzwa Muzarawetu 4/68 (10 overs) | | Regis Chakabva 106* (91); Tawanda Mupariwa 3/53 (10 overs) |

Mashonaland Eagles won by 5 wickets
Bulawayo Athletic Club, Bulawayo
Umpires: Trevor Phiri and Jeremiah Matibiri

- Matabeleland Tuskers won the toss and elected to bat.
