= 2016–17 Pro50 Championship =

Cricket tournament

- Dates: 10 February – 6 June 2017
- Administrator: Zimbabwe Cricket
- Cricket format: List A cricket
- Tournament format: Round-robin
- Champions: Matabeleland Tuskers (1st title)
- Participants: 4
- Matches: 12
- Most runs: Malcolm Waller (402)
- Most wickets: Brian Vitori (20)

The 2016–17 Pro50 Championship was the fifteenth edition of the Pro50 Championship, a List A cricket tournament in Zimbabwe. The competition ran from 10 February to 6 June 2017. It was originally scheduled to start in May, but was brought forward to February in preparation for Zimbabwe's One Day International (ODI) series against Afghanistan. The opening fixtures replaced the scheduled fixtures in the Logan Cup, which were rescheduled for later in the competition. The Pro50 Championship restarted late in May 2017, following the conclusion of the Logan Cup.

Matabeleland Tuskers won the tournament by topping the points table, with one game to spare.

== Points table ==
| Team | Pld | W | L | NR | Pts | NRR |
|---|---|---|---|---|---|---|
| Matabeleland Tuskers | 6 | 5 | 1 | 0 | 23 | +1.016 |
| Mid West Rhinos | 6 | 3 | 2 | 1 | 16 | +0.791 |
| Mountaineers | 6 | 2 | 4 | 0 | 8 | –0.609 |
| Mashonaland Eagles | 6 | 1 | 4 | 1 | 6 | –1.415 |

Champions

== Fixtures ==
=== Round-robin ===
10 February 2017
Scorecard

| Mashonaland Eagles; 257/8 (50 overs) | v | Mountaineers; 144/4 (31.5 overs) |
| Regis Chakabva 76 (107); Innocent Kaia 2/30 (6 overs) | | Hamilton Masakadza 59 (61); Sikandar Raza 2/24 (5.5 overs) |

Mashonaland Eagles won by 3 runs (D/L method)
Harare Sports Club, Harare
Umpires: Owen Chirombe and Sifelani Rwaziyeni

- Mountaineers won the toss and elected to field.

10 February 2017
Scorecard

| Mid West Rhinos; 238/9 (50 overs) | v | Matabeleland Tuskers; 239/4 (49.1 overs) |
| Malcolm Waller 115* (130); Brian Vitori 4/49 (10 overs) | | Craig Ervine 74 (98); Neville Madziva 2/31 (8 overs) |

Matabeleland Tuskers won by 6 wickets
Queens Sports Club, Bulawayo
Umpires: Jeremiah Matibiri and Lucky Ngwenya

- Mid West Rhinos won the toss and elected to bat.

12 February 2017
Scorecard

| Mid West Rhinos; 188/7 (40.1 overs) | v | Mashonaland Eagles |
| Bothwell Chapungu 76 (89); Sikandar Raza 3/34 (7.1 overs) |

No result
Harare Sports Club, Harare
Umpires: Iknow Chabi and Russell Tiffin

- Mashonaland Eagles won the toss and elected to field.
- Lightning stopped play, with no further play possible due to a wet outfield.

12 February 2017
Scorecard

| Mountaineers; 148 (46.3 overs) | v | Matabeleland Tuskers; 149/3 (35.1 overs) |
| Vusi Sibanda 42 (66); Chris Mpofu 2/12 (7.3 overs) | | Brian Chari 84* (121); Wellington Masakadza 1/26 (10 overs) |

Matabeleland Tuskers won by 7 wickets
Queens Sports Club, Bulawayo
Umpires: Christopher Phiri and Langton Rusere

- Mountaineers won the toss and elected to bat.

25 May 2017
Scorecard

| Matabeleland Tuskers; 276/9 (50 overs) | v | Mashonaland Eagles; 99 (28.5 overs) |
| Brian Chari 105 (130); Brighton Zhawi 4/41 (9 overs) | | Tinotenda Mutombodzi 46 (73); Brian Vitori 7/29 (8.5 overs) |

Matabeleland Tuskers won by 177 runs
Queens Sports Club, Bulawayo
Umpires: Owen Chirombe and Christopher Phiri

- Mashonaland Eagles won the toss and elected to field.
- Ernest Masuku (Matabeleland Tuskers) made his List A debut.

25 May 2017
Scorecard

| Mid West Rhinos; 263/9 (50 overs) | v | Mountaineers; 264/6 (45 overs) |
| Bothwell Chapungu 73 (66); Donald Tiripano 3/65 (10 overs) | | Forster Mutizwa 61* (74); Michael Chinouya 3/45 (10 overs) |

Mountaineers won by 4 wickets
Mutare Sports Club, Mutare
Umpires: Iknow Chabi and Jeremiah Matibiri

- Mountaineers won the toss and elected to field.

28 May 2017
Scorecard

| Mashonaland Eagles; 236 (43.3 overs) | v | Mountaineers; 238/6 (44.5 overs) |
| Tinotenda Mutombodzi 81 (85); Shingi Masakadza 2/42 (6 overs) | | Innocent Kaia 70 (80); Sikandar Raza 2/38 (8 overs) |

Mountaineers won by 4 wickets
Mutare Sports Club, Mutare
Umpires: Iknow Chabi and Russell Tiffin

- Mountaineers won the toss and elected to field.

28 May 2017
Scorecard

| Matabeleland Tuskers; 244/9 (50 overs) | v | Mid West Rhinos; 245/6 (45 overs) |
| Sean Williams 101 (101); Neville Madziva 3/14 (9 overs) | | Solomon Mire 101 (107); Thabo Mboyi 2/32 (8 overs) |

Mid West Rhinos won by 4 wickets
Kwekwe Sports Club, Kwekwe
Umpires: Owen Chirombe and Josphat Mutapure

- Mid West Rhinos won the toss and elected to field.

2 June 2017
Scorecard

| Mashonaland Eagles; 174 (42.1 overs) | v | Mid West Rhinos; 176/8 (37.2 overs) |
| Chamu Chibhabha 59 (80); Graeme Cremer 3/25 (8.1 overs) | | Peter Moor 67 (75); Tinotenda Mutombodzi 3/7 (3 overs) |

Mid West Rhinos won by 2 wickets
Kwekwe Sports Club, Kwekwe
Umpires: Owen Chirombe and Stanley Gogwe

- Mid West Rhinos won the toss and elected to field.

2 June 2017
Scorecard

| Mountaineers; 209 (48.4 overs) | v | Matabeleland Tuskers; 166/3 (42 overs) |
| Timycen Maruma 40 (67); Brian Vitori 3/39 (9.4 overs) | | Brian Chari 69* (103); Wellington Masakadza 1/33 (10 overs) |

Matabeleland Tuskers won by 7 runs (D/L method)
Mutare Sports Club, Mutare
Umpires: Iknow Chabi and Jeremiah Matibiri

- Matabeleland Tuskers won the toss and elected to field.
- Clive Chitumba (Mountaineers) made his List A debut.

6 June 2017
Scorecard

| Mashonaland Eagles; 208 (44.2 overs) | v | Matabeleland Tuskers; 209/1 (38.5 overs) |
| Chamu Chibhabha 65 (90); John Nyumbu 3/17 (6 overs) | | Brian Chari 105* (123); T Munyoro 1/39 (7 overs) |

Matabeleland Tuskers won by 9 wickets
Harare Sports Club, Harare
Umpires: Owen Chirombe and Langton Rusere

- Mashonaland Eagles won the toss and elected to bat.
- T Munyoro (Mashonaland Eagles) made his List A debut.

6 June 2017
Scorecard

| Mid West Rhinos; 298/8 (50 overs) | v | Mountaineers; 168 (36.5 overs) |
| Malcolm Waller 113 (86); Tendai Chatara 4/53 (10 overs) | | Kevin Kasuza 71 (67); Graeme Cremer 6/33 (10 overs) |

Mid West Rhinos won by 130 runs
Kwekwe Sports Club, Kwekwe
Umpires: Stanley Gogwe and Russell Tiffin

- Mountaineers won the toss and elected to field.
