= 2021 Zimbabwe Domestic Twenty20 =

Cricket tournament

2020–21 Zimbabwe Domestic Twenty20 Competition
- Dates: 10 – 16 April 2021
- Administrator: Zimbabwe Cricket
- Cricket format: Twenty20 cricket
- Tournament format(s): Round-robin and Final
- Champions: Tuskers (2nd title)
- Participants: 5
- Matches: 12
- Most runs: Craig Ervine (250)
- Most wickets: Donald Tiripano (11)

The 2021 Zimbabwe Domestic Twenty20 Competition was a Twenty20 cricket tournament that was played in Zimbabwe during April 2021. Five teams took part in the competition, with two matches being played each day. Due to a logistical challenge, the opening day match between Tuskers and Rhinos was moved back to 15 April, with the play-off and final being moved back one day as a result. The Matabeleland Tuskers won the last domestic T20 tournament to be played in Zimbabwe, during the 2018–19 season.

Following the conclusion of the group stage, Tuskers and Eagles qualified for the final of the tournament. Rocks beat Mountaineers to win the 3rd place play-off match, and in the final, Tuskers beat Eagles by 69 runs to win the tournament.

== Points table ==
Pos	Team	Pld	W	L	NR	Pts	NRR
1	Tuskers	4	3	1	0	30	1.509
2	Eagles	4	3	1	0	30	0.481
3	Rocks	4	2	2	0	20	0.333
4	Mountaineers	4	2	2	0	20	−0.393
5	Rhinos	4	0	4	0	0	−1.980

Source: Cricinfo

Advanced to the Final Advanced to the 3rd Place Play-Off

== Fixtures ==
=== Round-robin ===
10 April 2021
Scorecard

Mountaineers; 105 (16.1 overs)	v	Eagles; 106/3 (18.2 overs)
Gary Chirimuuta 32 (31); Brad Evans 3/28 (4 overs)		Wesley Madhevere 45* (41); Brighton Chipungu 2/13 (4 overs)

Eagles won by 7 wickets
Harare Sports Club, Harare
Umpires: Christopher Phiri and Percival Sizara
Player of the match: Wesley Madhevere (Eagles)

- Mountaineers won the toss and elected to bat.
- Brad Evans, Tanaka Chivanga, Tinashe Nenhunzi (Eagles), Brighton Chipungu, Dion Myers and Tinashe Chiora (Mountaineers) all made their T20 debuts.

11 April 2021
Scorecard

Tuskers; 147/5 (20 overs)	v	Eagles; 142/8 (20 overs)
Milton Shumba 37* (27); Tapiwa Mufudza 2/25 (4 overs)		Regis Chakabva 65 (36); Milton Shumba 5/18 (4 overs)

Tuskers won by 5 runs
Harare Sports Club, Harare
Umpires: David Shawane and Forster Mutizwa
Player of the match: Milton Shumba (Tuskers)

- Tuskers won the toss and elected to bat.
- Clive Madande, Simbarashe Haukozi and Tanatswa Bechani (Tuskers) all made their T20 debuts.

11 April 2021
Scorecard

Rhinos; 158/5 (20 overs)	v	Rocks; 159/6 (17.4 overs)
Ryan Burl 53 (31); Roy Kaia 2/19 (4 overs)		Tadiwanashe Marumani 60 (30); Johnathan Campbell 3/19 (4 overs)

Rocks won by 4 wickets
Harare Sports Club, Harare
Umpires: Christopher Phiri and Walter Musakwa
Player of the match: Tadiwanashe Marumani (Rocks)

- Rocks won the toss and elected to field.
- Andre Odendaal, Tadiwanashe Marumani, Travor Mutsamba (Rocks) and Tashinga Musekiwa (Rhinos) all made their T20 debuts.

12 April 2021
Scorecard

Tuskers; 141/6 (20 overs)	v	Rocks; 143/3 (16.5 overs)
Brian Chari 47 (34); Roy Kaia 3/21 (4 overs)		Tadiwanashe Marumani 63* (42); Ernest Masuku 2/28 (2 overs)

Rocks won by 7 wickets
Harare Sports Club, Harare
Umpires: Langton Rusere and Percival Sizara
Player of the match: Tadiwanashe Marumani (Rocks)

- Rocks won the toss and elected to field.
- Delan Hondo (Rocks) made his T20 debut.

12 April 2021
Scorecard

Mountaineers; 144/9 (20 overs)	v	Rhinos; 121 (18.2 overs)
Wellington Masakadza 56 (39); Brandon Mavuta 3/14 (4 overs)		Ryan Burl 32 (30); Donald Tiripano 4/13 (3.2 overs)

Mountaineers won by 23 runs
Harare Sports Club, Harare
Umpires: Forster Mutizwa and Walter Musakwa
Player of the match: Donald Tiripano (Mountaineers)

- Rhinos won the toss and elected to field.

13 April 2021
Scorecard

Rhinos; 194/1 (20 overs)	v	Eagles; 196/4 (16.4 overs)
Brendan Taylor 140* (78); Daniel Jakiel 1/39 (4 overs)		Regis Chakabva 59 (29); Brandon Mavuta 2/47 (4 overs)

Eagles won by 6 wickets
Old Hararians, Harare
Umpires: Christopher Phiri and Percival Sizara
Player of the match: Regis Chakabva (Eagles)

- Eagles won the toss and elected to field.
- Takudzwanashe Kaitano (Rhinos) made his T20 debut.

13 April 2021
Scorecard

Mountaineers; 175/5 (20 overs)	v	Rocks; 153/9 (18.1 overs)
Gary Chirimuuta 64* (38); Blessing Muzarabani 1/15 (4 overs)		Cephas Zhuwao 42 (25); Shingi Masakadza 3/17 (3 overs)

Mountaineers won by 22 runs
Old Hararians, Harare
Umpires: Iknow Chabi and Langton Rusere
Player of the match: Gary Chirimuuta (Mountaineers)

- Mountaineers won the toss and elected to bat.

14 April 2021
Scorecard

Eagles; 163/3 (20 overs)	v	Rocks; 163/7 (20 overs)
Chamu Chibhabha 73* (60); Travor Mutsamba 1/13 (3 overs)		Tadiwanashe Marumani 52 (35); Tapiwa Mufudza 3/26 (4 overs)

Match tied
(Eagles won the Super Over)
Old Hararians, Harare
Umpires: Forster Mutizwa and Stanley Gogwe
Player of the match: Tanaka Chivanga (Eagles)

- Rocks won the toss and elected to field.
- Privilege Chesa (Rocks) made his T20 debut.

14 April 2021
Scorecard

Tuskers; 206/5 (20 overs)	v	Mountaineers; 143 (19.5 overs)
Craig Ervine 120* (54); Donald Tiripano 2/46 (4 overs)		Kevin Kasuza 46 (27); Luke Jongwe 2/16 (3 overs)

Tuskers won by 63 runs
Old Hararians, Harare
Umpires: Iknow Chabi and Langton Rusere
Player of the match: Craig Ervine (Tuskers)

- Tuskers won the toss and elected to bat.
- Bright Phiri (Tuskers) made his T20 debut.

15 April 2021
Scorecard

Tuskers; 215/5 (20 overs)	v	Rhinos; 137 (16.3 overs)
Brian Chari 89 (46); Tashinga Musekiwa 2/26 (3 overs)		Brendan Taylor 43 (24); Thabo Mboyi 3/13 (2 overs)

Tuskers won by 78 runs
Old Hararians, Harare
Umpires: Iknow Chabi and Stanley Gogwe
Player of the match: Brian Chari (Tuskers)

- Tuskers won the toss and elected to bat.

== Playoffs ==
3rd Place
16 April 2021
Scorecard

Mountaineers; 160/5 (20 overs)	v	Rocks; 161/8 (18.4 overs)
Kevin Kasuza 45 (33); William Mashinge 2/13 (2 overs)		Tadiwanashe Marumani 51 (34); Tendai Chatara 3/17 (4 overs)

Rocks won by 2 wickets
Old Hararians, Harare
Umpires: Forster Mutizwa and Percival Sizara
Player of the match: Tadiwanashe Marumani (Rocks)

- Mountaineers won the toss and elected to bat.
- Clive Chitumba (Mountaineers) made his T20 debut.

Final
16 April 2021
Scorecard

Tuskers; 179/6 (20 overs)	v	Eagles; 110 (15 overs)
Craig Ervine 65 (47); Wesley Madhevere 3/19 (4 overs)		Gareth Chirawu 39 (32); Ainsley Ndlovu 5/20 (4 overs)

Tuskers won by 69 runs
Old Hararians, Harare
Umpires: Christopher Phiri and Stanley Gogwe
Player of the match: Craig Ervine (Tuskers)

- Eagles won the toss and elected to field.
- Gareth Chirawu and Rodney Mupfudza (Eagles) both made their T20 debuts.
