= South Africa A cricket team in Zimbabwe in 2021–22 =

	Zimbabwe XI	South Africa A
- Dates: 25 April – 10 May 2022
Captains	Sikandar Raza	Heinrich Klaasen

Twenty20 International series
- Results: South Africa A won the 5-match series 4–1
Most runs	Sikandar Raza (129)	Reeza Hendricks (194)
Most wickets	Tanaka Chivanga (7)	Glenton Stuurman (10)
- Player of the series: Reeza Hendricks

LA series
- Result: South Africa A won the 3-match series 2–1
Most runs	Sikandar Raza (98)	Andile Phehlukwayo (143)
Most wickets	Wellington Masakadza (6)	Lizaad Williams (5)
- Player of the series: Andile Phehlukwayo

The South Africa A cricket team toured Zimbabwe in April and May to play three List-A matches and five Twenty20 matches against the Zimbabwe XI cricket team. All the matches were played at Harare Sports Club in Harare.

Zimbabwe XI won the first Unofficial ODI by 5 runs due to DLS method as the play was stopped after 48.5 overs due to Bad light. 2nd Unofficial ODI was also interrupted by rain twice. South Africa A's innings was reduced to 46.5 overs with South Africa scoring 266 runs thanks to Reeza Hendricks 102 runs. Zimbabwe XI initially were given a target of 283 runs in 46 overs by applying DLS method. But it was again reduced to 145 runs from 20 overs as play had to stopped due to rain for 2nd time. Eventually South Africa won the 2nd Unofficial ODI by 51 runs levelling the series 1–1 with one match to be played. South Africa A went on to win the 3rd Unofficial ODI by 36 runs and won the List-A series by 2–1.

South Africa A maintained their win campaign by winning the T20 series 4–1.

== Squads ==
Zimbabwe XI	South Africa A	
LAs and T20s	LAs	T20s
Sikandar Raza (c); Ryan Burl; Tendai Chatara; Tanaka Chivanga; Takudzwanashe Kaitano; Kevin Kasuza; Wessly Madhevere; Wellington Masakadza; Ernest Masuku; Prince Masvaure; Nyasha Mayavo; Richmond Mutumbami; Milton Shumba; Donald Tiripano	Heinrich Klaasen (c); Ryan Rickelton; Reeza Hendricks; Tony de Zorzi; Theunis de Bruyn; Khaya Zondo; Andile Phehlukwayo; Bjorn Fortuin; Daryn Dupavillon; Lizaad Williams; Jason Smith; ~~Lutho Sipamla~~; Glenton Stuurman; Lesiba Ngoepe; ~~Prenelan Subrayen~~; Wihan Lubbe; Gerald Coetzee	Heinrich Klaasen (c); Ryan Rickelton; Reeza Hendricks; Khaya Zondo; Andile Phehlukwayo; Glenton Stuurman; Bjorn Fortuin; Daryn Dupavillon; ~~Prenelan Subrayen~~; Wihan Lubbe; Lizaad Williams; Jason Smith; Lesiba Ngoepe; Gerald Coetzee; Tristan Stubbs

Ahead of the tour, Lutho Sipamla returned home to South Africa due to an aggravation to the injury which he had suffered during South Africa's Test matches against Bangladesh. Glenton Stuurman was named his replacement. Prenelan Subrayen was ruled out of SA A squad for the List-A series due to testing COVID-19 positive. Wihan Lubbe was added to SA A squad for the LA series replacing Prenelan.

== List-A Series ==
=== 1st Unofficial ODI ===
25 April 2022
09:15
Scorecard

South Africa A 273/7 (50 overs)	v	Zimbabwe XI; 266/6 (48.5 overs)
Andile Phehlukwayo 87 (93); Donald Tiripano 4/57 (8 overs)		Sikandar Raza 59 (50); Reeza Hendricks 2/24 (4 overs)

Zimbabwe XI won by 5 runs (DLS method)
Harare Sports Club, Harare
Umpires: Forster Mutizwa (Zim) and Iknow Chabi (Zim)

- Zimbabwe XI won the toss and elected to field.
- Play was stopped after 48.5 overs due to bad light. As Zim XI were 5 runs ahead of DLS par score, they were declared winners.

=== 2nd Unofficial ODI ===
27 April 2022
09:15
Scorecard

South Africa A 266/6 (46.5 overs)	v	Zimbabwe XI; 93/4 (20 overs)
Reeza Hendricks 102 (107); Tendai Chatara 2/44 (8.5 overs)		Sikandar Raza 39* (36); Lizaad Williams 2/19 (5 overs)

South Africa A won by 51 runs (DLS method)
Harare Sports Club, Harare
Umpires: Christopher Phiri (Zim) and Iknow Chabi (Zim)

- Zimbabwe XI won the toss and elected to field.
- South Africa A's innings was stopped after 46.5 overs due to rain. Zimbabwe XI were given a target of 283 runs in 46 overs. Again the target was reduced to 145 runs from 20 overs due to second rain interruption.

=== 3rd Unofficial ODI ===
29 April 2022
09:15
Scorecard

South Africa A 287/9 (50 overs)	v	Zimbabwe XI; 251 (47.2 overs)
Tony de Zorzi 78 (92); Wellington Masakadza 4/44 (10 overs)		Kevin Kasuza 66 (99); Andile Phehlukwayo 4/32 (6.2 overs)

South Africa A won by 36 runs
Harare Sports Club, Harare
Umpires: Stanley Gogwe (Zim) and Langton Rusere (Zim)

- Zimbabwe XI won the toss and elected to field.

== Twenty20 series ==
=== 1st Unofficial T20 ===
2 May 2022
13:30
Scorecard

Zimbabwe XI; 114 (19.5 overs)	v	South Africa A 115/5 (17.4 overs)
Takudzwanashe Kaitano 20 (15); Glenton Stuurman 3/18 (4 overs)		Tristan Stubbs 39* (37); Tanaka Chivanga 2/11 (2.4 overs)

South Africa A won by 5 wickets.
Harare Sports Club, Harare
Umpires: Christopher Phiri (Zim) and Langton Rusere (Zim)

- South Africa A won the toss and elected to field.

=== 2nd Unofficial T20 ===
4 May 2022
13:30
Scorecard

South Africa A 224/4 (20 overs)	v	Zimbabwe XI; 202/9 (20 overs)
Lesiba Ngoepe 114 (63); Tendai Chatara 1/37 (4 overs); Sikandar Raza 1/37 (4 overs)		Sikandar Raza 82 (42); Lizaad Williams 3/38 (4 overs)

South Africa A won by 22 runs.
Harare Sports Club, Harare
Umpires: Forster Mutizwa (Zim) and Langton Rusere (Zim)
Player of the match: Lesiba Ngoepe (South Africa A)

- South Africa A won the toss and elected to bat.

=== 3rd Unofficial T20 ===
7 May 2022
13:30
Scorecard

South Africa A 184/8 (20 overs)	v	Zimbabwe XI; 42 (12 overs)
Heinrich Klaasen 56 (31); Tanaka Chivanga 3/29 (4 overs)		Richmond Mutumbami 16 (22); Junior Dala 3/12 (3 overs)

South Africa A won by 142 runs.
Harare Sports Club, Harare
Umpires: Iknow Chabi (Zim) and Percival Sizara (Zim)

- Zimbabwe XI won the toss and elected to field.

=== 4th Unofficial T20 ===
8 May 2022
13:00
Scorecard

Zimbabwe XI; 135/9 (20 overs)	v	South Africa A 73 (16 overs)
Ryan Burl 41 (31); Gerald Coetzee 4/19 (4 overs)		Khaya Zondo 18 (29); Milton Shumba 4/15 (4 overs)

Zimbabwe XI won by 62 runs.
Harare Sports Club, Harare
Umpires: Christopher Phiri (Zim) and Forster Mutizwa (Zim)

- Zimbabwe XI won the toss and elected to bat.

=== 5th Unofficial T20 ===
10 May 2022
13:30
Scorecard

South Africa A 212/2 (20 overs)	v	Zimbabwe XI; 120/9 (20 overs)
Reeza Hendricks 101* (55); Ernest Masuku 2/34 (4 overs)		Sikandar Raza 25 (25); Junior Dala 3/19 (4 overs)

South Africa A won by 92 runs.
Harare Sports Club, Harare
Umpires: Iknow Chabi (Zim) and Langton Rusere (Zim)
Player of the match: Reeza Hendricks (South Africa A)

- South Africa A won the toss and elected to bat.
