= Afghan cricket team in Zimbabwe in 2015–16 =

International cricket tour

	Zimbabwe	Afghanistan
- Dates: 8 October 2015 – 29 October 2015
Captains	Elton Chigumbura	Asghar Stanikzai

One Day International series
- Results: Afghanistan won the 5-match series 3–2
Most runs	Sean Williams (152)	Mohammad Nabi (223)
Most wickets	Wellington Masakadza (10)	Dawlat Zadran (9); Amir Hamza (9)
- Player of the series: Mohammad Nabi (Afg)

Twenty20 International series
- Results: Afghanistan won the 2-match series 2–0
Most runs	Sikandar Raza (80)	Usman Ghani (78)
Most wickets	Chamu Chibhabha (2)	Dawlat Zadran (5)

The Afghan cricket team toured Zimbabwe between 8 and 29 October 2015. The tour consisted of five One Day International (ODI) matches, two Twenty20 Internationals (T20I) and two tour matches. This was the first time for Afghanistan to play a five-match bilateral ODI series.

Having won the first two ODIs, Afghanistan lost the next two matches. The Afghans won the last ODI, taking the ODI series 3–2 and becoming the first Associate side to beat an ICC Full Member nation in a multi-game ODI series. Afghanistan won the T20I series 2–0.

== Squads ==
ODIs		T20Is	
Zimbabwe	Afghanistan	Zimbabwe	Afghanistan
Elton Chigumbura (c); Brian Chari; Chamu Chibhabha; Tendai Chisoro; Craig Ervine; Luke Jongwe; Neville Madziva; Wellington Masakadza; Tinotenda Mutombodzi; Richmond Mutumbami; Taurai Muzarabani; John Nyumbu; Tinashe Panyangara; Sikandar Raza; Sean Williams	Asghar Stanikzai (c); Aftab Alam; Amir Hamza; Dawlat Zadran; Fareed Ahmad; Hashmatullah Shahidi; Mirwais Ashraf; Mohammad Nabi; Mohammad Shahzad; Najibullah Zadran; Nawroz Mangal; Noor Ali Zadran; Samiullah Shinwari; Shafiqullah; Shapoor Zadran	Elton Chigumbura (c); Brian Chari; Chamu Chibhabha; Tendai Chisoro; Craig Ervine; Luke Jongwe; Neville Madziva; Wellington Masakadza; Tinotenda Mutombodzi; Richmond Mutumbami; Taurai Muzarabani; John Nyumbu; Tinashe Panyangara; Sikandar Raza; Sean Williams	Asghar Stanikzai (c); Aftab Alam; Amir Hamza; Fareed Ahmad; Gulbadin Naib; Karim Sadiq; Mirwais Ashraf; Mohammad Nabi; Mohammad Shahzad; Nawroz Mangal; Rashid Khan; Samiullah Shinwari; Shafiqullah; Shapoor Zadran; Usman Ghani

== Tour matches ==
=== One-day: Zimbabwe Chairman's XI v Afghanistan ===
8 October 2015
Scorecard

Afghanistan; 356/5 (50 overs)	v	Zimbabwe Chairman's XI; 286 (48.1 overs)
Noor Ali Zadran 98 (123); Tendai Chisoro 3/48 (10 overs)		Kevin Kasuza 80 (97); Nawroz Mangal 2/22 (3 overs)

Afghanistan won by 70 runs
Bulawayo Athletic Club, Bulawayo
Umpires: Christopher Phiri (Zim) and Trevor Phiri (Zim)

- Afghanistan won the toss and elected to bat.
- 15 players per side (11 batting, 11 fielding).

=== One-day: Zimbabwe Chairman's XI v Afghanistan ===
10 October 2015
Scorecard

Afghanistan; 226 (49 overs)	v	Zimbabwe Chairman's XI; 204 (44.1 overs)
Mohammad Shahzad 72 (94); Tapiwa Mufudza 3/57 (10 overs)		Tendai Chisoro 63 (55); Amir Hamza 2/12 (6 overs)

Afghanistan won by 22 runs
Bulawayo Athletic Club, Bulawayo
Umpires: Christopher Phiri (Zim) and Trevor Phiri (Zim)

- Zimbabwe Chairman's XI won the toss and elected to field.

== ODI series ==
=== 1st ODI ===
16 October 2015
Scorecard

Afghanistan; 122 (34.1 overs)	v	Zimbabwe; 126/2 (23.2 overs)
Najibullah Zadran 25 (31); Wellington Masakadza 4/21 (6.1 overs)		Chamu Chibhabha 58 (69); Aftab Alam 1/21 (5 overs)

Zimbabwe won by 8 wickets
Queens Sports Club, Bulawayo
Umpires: Nigel Llong (Eng) and Russell Tiffin (Zim)
Player of the match: Wellington Masakadza (Zim)

- Afghanistan won the toss and elected to bat.
- Tendai Chisoro (Zim) made his ODI debut.

=== 2nd ODI ===
18 October 2015
Scorecard

Afghanistan; 271/6 (50 overs)	v	Zimbabwe; 213 (46.4 overs)
Mohammad Nabi 116 (121); Tinotenda Mutombodzi 2/40 (7 overs)		Luke Jongwe 46 (33); Samiullah Shinwari 2/23 (4 overs)

Afghanistan won by 58 runs
Queens Sports Club, Bulawayo
Umpires: Nigel Llong (Eng) and Russell Tiffin (Zim)
Player of the match: Mohammad Nabi (Afg)

- Afghanistan won the toss and elected to bat.
- Rashid Khan (Afg) made his ODI and List A debut.
- Mohammad Nabi (Afg) scored his first century in ODIs.

=== 3rd ODI ===
20 October 2015
Scorecard

Afghanistan; 223/8 (50 overs)	v	Zimbabwe; 229/4 (49.4 overs)
Noor Ali Zadran 56 (108); Tendai Chisoro 2/40 (10 overs)		Richmond Mutumbami 74 (92); Amir Hamza 3/47 (10 overs)

Zimbabwe won by 6 wickets
Queens Sports Club, Bulawayo
Umpires: Nigel Llong (Eng) and Jeremiah Matibiri (Zim)
Player of the match: Richmond Mutumbami (Zim)

- Zimbabwe won the toss and elected to field.

=== 4th ODI ===
22 October 2015
Scorecard

Zimbabwe; 184/8 (50 overs)	v	Afghanistan; 185/7 (46.4 overs)
Sikandar Raza 86 (113); Dawlat Zadran 3/37 (9 overs)		Mohammad Shahzad 80 (81); Tendai Chisoro 3/38 (10 overs)

Afghanistan won by 3 wickets
Queens Sports Club, Bulawayo
Umpires: Nigel Llong (Eng) and Jeremiah Matibiri (Zim)
Player of the match: Mohammad Shahzad (Afg)

- Zimbabwe won the toss and elected to bat.

=== 5th ODI ===
24 October 2015
Scorecard

Afghanistan; 245/9 (50 overs)	v	Zimbabwe; 172 (44.1 overs)
Noor Ali Zadran 54 (88); Wellington Masakadza 3/31 (9 overs)		Sean Williams 102 (124); Dawlat Zadran 4/22 (8 overs)

Afghanistan won by 73 runs
Queens Sports Club, Bulawayo
Umpires: Nigel Llong (Eng) and Langton Rusere (Zim)
Player of the match: Sean Williams (Zim) and Dawlat Zadran (Afg)

- Zimbabwe won the toss and elected to field.
- Sean Williams (Zim) scored his first ODI century.

== T20I series ==
=== 1st T20I ===
26 October 2015
Scorecard

Zimbabwe; 153/5 (20 overs)	v	Afghanistan; 154/4 (19.1 overs)
Sikandar Raza 59 (41); Dawlat Zadran 3/29 (4 overs)		Najibullah Zadran 37* (26); Sean Williams 1/20 (2 overs)

Afghanistan won by 6 wickets
Queens Sports Club, Bulawayo
Umpires: Jeremiah Matibiri (Zim) and Russell Tiffin (Zim)
Player of the match: Dawlat Zadran (Afg)

- Zimbabwe won the toss and elected to bat.
- Rashid Khan, Usman Ghani (Afg) and Tendai Chisoro, Wellington Masakadza (Zim) all made their T20I debuts.

=== 2nd T20I ===
28 October 2015
Scorecard

Zimbabwe; 190/7 (20 overs)	v	Afghanistan; 191/5 (19.5 overs)
Sean Williams 54 (26); Dawlat Zadran 2/24 (4 overs)		Usman Ghani 65 (45); Chamu Chibhabha 2/37 (4 overs)

Afghanistan won by 5 wickets
Queens Sports Club, Bulawayo
Umpires: Langton Rusere (Zim) and Russell Tiffin (Zim)
Player of the match: Gulbadin Naib (Afg)

- Zimbabwe won the toss and elected to bat.
