= New Zealand cricket team in Zimbabwe in 2016 =

International cricket tour

	Zimbabwe	New Zealand
- Dates: 22 July – 10 August 2016
Captains	Graeme Cremer	Kane Williamson

Test series
- Result: New Zealand won the 2-match series 2–0
Most runs	Craig Ervine (236)	Ross Taylor (364)
Most wickets	Michael Chinouya (3); Donald Tiripano (3)	Neil Wagner (11)
- Player of the series: Neil Wagner (NZ)

The New Zealand cricket team toured Zimbabwe in July and August 2016 to play two Test matches. Both Test matches took place at Queens Sports Club, Bulawayo. They were the first Tests for Zimbabwe since they toured Bangladesh at the end of 2014. New Zealand won the two-match series 2–0.

New Zealand Cricket (NZC) monitored unrest that was happening in Zimbabwe before the tour started, including nationwide strikes and protests. There were no plans to delay the team's departure for the series and the New Zealand squad arrived in the country on July 20 as scheduled. Zimbabwe fans were asked to join a peaceful protest during the second Test of the series in support of the #thisflag movement.

== Squads ==
Zimbabwe	New Zealand
Graeme Cremer (c); Regis Chakabva; Brian Chari; ~~Tendai Chatara~~; Chamu Chibhabha; Michael Chinouya; Craig Ervine; Hamilton Masakadza; Prince Masvaure; Tino Mawoyo; Peter Moor; Richmond Mutumbami; Taurai Muzarabani; Njabulo Ncube; Sikandar Raza; Donald Tiripano; Sean Williams	Kane Williamson (c); Trent Boult; Doug Bracewell; Mark Craig; Martin Guptill; Matt Henry; Tom Latham (wk); Henry Nicholls; Luke Ronchi (wk); Jeet Raval; Mitchell Santner; Ish Sodhi; Tim Southee; Ross Taylor; Neil Wagner; BJ Watling (wk)

Tendai Chatara was ruled out of Zimbabwe's squad with an ankle injury which he got in the warm-up match. Michael Chinouya was named as his replacement.

== Tour match ==
=== Three-day: Zimbabwe A v New Zealanders ===
22–24 July 2016
Scorecard

New Zealanders	v	Zimbabwe A
345/7d (90 overs); Martin Guptill 74 (101); Gerald Aliseni 2/31 (11 overs)		114 (49.5 overs); Sean Williams 53 (106); Ish Sodhi 4/18 (4.5 overs)
201/7d (51.5 overs); Mitchell Santner 51 (49); Tatenda Mupunga 1/37 (9.5 overs)		173 (61.5 overs); Regis Chakabva 48 (125); Tim Southee 2/15 (6 overs)

New Zealanders won by 259 runs
Harare Sports Club, Harare
Umpires: Iknow Chabi (Zim) and Sifelani Rwaziyeni (Zim)

- New Zealanders won the toss and elected to bat.
- 16 players per side, 11 batting, 11 fielding.

== Test series ==
=== 1st Test ===
28 July–1 August 2016
Scorecard

Zimbabwe	v	New Zealand
164 (77.5 overs); Donald Tiripano 49* (162); Neil Wagner 6/41 (20.5 overs)		576/6d (166.5 overs); Ross Taylor 173* (299); Hamilton Masakadza 1/25 (9 overs)
295 (79 overs); Sean Williams 119 (148); Trent Boult 4/52 (17 overs)

New Zealand won by an innings and 117 runs
Queens Sports Club, Bulawayo
Umpires: Michael Gough (Eng) and Paul Reiffel (Aus)
Player of the match: Ross Taylor (NZ)

- Zimbabwe won the toss and elected to bat.
- Chamu Chibhabha, Michael Chinouya and Prince Masvaure (all Zim) made their Test debuts.
- Michael Gough (Eng) stood in his first Test match as an umpire.
- Chamu Chibhabha played in the most ODIs for Zimbabwe before making his Test debut (96).
- Neil Wagner (NZ) took his best figures in a Test with 6/41.
- Trent Boult (NZ) took his 150th Test wicket.
- Sean Williams (Zim) scored his maiden Test century and the fastest century for a Zimbabwe player.

=== 2nd Test ===
6–10 August 2016
Scorecard

New Zealand	v	Zimbabwe
582/4d (150 overs); Tom Latham 136 (269); Michael Chinouya 1/64 (22 overs)		362 (143.4 overs); Craig Ervine 146 (272); Ish Sodhi 4/60 (21.4 overs)
166/2d (36 overs); Kane Williamson 68* (103); Donald Tiripano 1/14 (6 overs)		132 (68.4 overs); Tino Mawoyo 35 (92); Martin Guptill 3/11 (7 overs)

New Zealand won by 254 runs
Queens Sports Club, Bulawayo
Umpires: Michael Gough (Eng) and Paul Reiffel (Aus)
Player of the match: Kane Williamson (NZ)

- New Zealand won the toss and elected to bat.
- Peter Moor (Zim) made his Test debut.
- Kane Williamson (NZ) became the thirteenth batsman to score a century against all the other Test playing nations. He completed this in the fewest innings, the quickest time from his Test debut and became the youngest player to achieve this feat.
- Craig Ervine (Zim) scored his maiden Test century.
- This was New Zealand's biggest win in terms of runs in a Test match.
