= 2025–26 Zimbabwe Domestic Twenty20 =

Cricket tournament

2025–26 Zimbabwe Domestic Twenty20 Competition
- Dates: 8 December 2025 – 11 January 2026
- Administrator: Zimbabwe Cricket
- Cricket format: Twenty20
- Tournament format(s): Double-round robin and final
- Host: Zimbabwe
- Champions: Mid West Rhinos (2nd title)
- Participants: 5
- Matches: 21
- Most runs: Milton Shumba (Matabeleland Tuskers) (223)
- Most wickets: Graeme Cremer (Mid West Rhinos) (12); Jalat Khan (Southern Rocks) (12)

The 2025–26 Zimbabwe Domestic Twenty20 Competition was the 15th edition of the Zimbabwe Domestic Twenty20 Competition, a domestic Twenty20 cricket league that was played in Zimbabwe. The tournament took place from the 8 December 2025 to 11 January 2026.

== Points system ==
- The points system will be as follows:
  - Win, with bonus point - 3
  - Win, without bonus point - 2
  - No result - 1
  - Loss - 0

== Team and standings ==
=== Points table ===
Pos	Team	Pld	W	L	NR	BP	Pts	NRR	
1	Mid West Rhinos	8	5	1	2	3	15	1.610	Advance to the final
2	Mashonaland Eagles	8	4	1	3	2	13	1.387	Advance to the final
3	Southern Rocks	8	5	2	1	0	11	0.001	
4	Matabeleland Tuskers	8	1	6	1	0	3	−1.176	
5	Mountaineers	8	1	6	1	0	3	−1.455	

Source: ESPNcricinfo

=== Match summary ===
Team	Group matches								Play-offs
Team	1	2	3	4	5	6	7	8	Final
Mashonaland Eagles	1	1	2	4	7	8	11	13	N
Mountaineers	0	1	3	3	3	3	3	3	—
Mid West Rhinos	2	4	5	5	8	9	12	15	N
Southern Rocks	2	3	5	7	7	9	11	11	—
Matabeleland Tuskers	1	1	1	1	3	3	3	3	—

Win	Loss	Tie	No result	Eliminated

- Note: The total points at the end of each group match are listed.
- Note: Click on the points or results to see the match summary.

== Round-robin ==
Match 1
8 December 2025
09:30
Scorecard

Matabeleland Tuskers; 157/5 (19.5 overs)	v	Mashonaland Eagles
Clive Madande 53 (31); Kundai Matigimu 2/30 (4 overs)

No result
Harare Sports Club, Harare
Umpires: Langton Rusere and David Shawane

- Mashonaland Eagles won the toss and elected to field.
- Rain prevented any further play.
- Ali Hasnain (Mashonaland Eagles) and Petros Sithole (Matabeleland Tuskers) both made their T20 debuts.

Match 2
8 December 2025
13:30
Scorecard

Mountaineers; 59 (15.4 overs)	v	Mid West Rhinos; 60/1 (11 overs)
Brian Bennett 16 (15); Trevor Gwandu 3/10 (3 overs)		Ben Curran 34* (26); Tendai Chatara 1/11 (2 overs)

Mid West Rhinos won by 9 wickets
Harare Sports Club, Harare
Umpires: Iknow Chabi and Forster Mutizwa
Player of the match: Trevor Gwandu (Mid West Rhinos)

- Mountaineers won the toss and elected to bat.
- Maaz Khan, Muhammad Khwaja (Mid West Rhinos) and Vincent Masekesa (Mountaineers) all made their T20 debuts.

Match 3
9 December 2025
09:30
Scorecard

Mid West Rhinos; 166/5 (20 overs)	v	Matabeleland Tuskers; 116 (19 overs)
Antum Naqvi 46 (33); Tinotenda Maposa 2/26 (4 overs)		Clive Madande 39* (33); Maaz Khan 4/17 (4 overs)

Mid West Rhinos won by 50 runs
Harare Sports Club, Harare
Umpires: Forster Mutizwa and Percival Sizara
Player of the match: Maaz Khan (Mid West Rhinos)

- Matabeleland Tuskers won the toss and elected to field.

Match 4
9 December 2025
13:45
Scorecard

Southern Rocks; 126/4 (17 overs)	v	Mashonaland Eagles; 132/6 (17 overs)
Innocent Kaia 64* (46); Ali Hasnain 2/19 (4 overs)		Tinashe Kamunhukamwe 40 (37); Ali Asfand 2/18 (4 overs)

Southern Rocks won by 2 runs (DLS method)
Harare Sports Club, Harare
Umpires: Iknow Chabi and Langton Rusere
Player of the match: Innocent Kaia (Southern Rocks)

- Mashonaland Eagles won the toss and elected to field.
- The match was reduced to 17 overs per side due to rain.
- Mashonaland Eagles were set a revised target of 135 runs.
- Arinesto Vezha (Southern Rocks) made his T20 debut.

Match 5
10 December 2025
13:45
Scorecard

Southern Rocks; 49/4 (8.5 overs)	v	Mountaineers
Cephas Zhuwao 12 (8); Wellington Masakadza 2/4 (2 overs)

No result
Harare Sports Club, Harare
Umpires: Langton Rusere and David Shawane

- Mountaineers won the toss and elected to field.
- Rain prevented any further play.
- Shafi Ullah (Mountaineers) made his T20 debut.

Match 6
10 December 2025
18:30 (N)
Scorecard

Mid West Rhinos; 134/5 (16 overs)	v	Mashonaland Eagles; 19/0 (2.2 overs)
Brendan Taylor 33* (28); Dion Myers 2/26 (3 overs)		Tinashe Kamunhukamwe 18* (11)

No result
Harare Sports Club, Harare
Umpires: Tafadzwa Musakwa and Percival Sizara

- Mid West Rhinos won the toss and elected to field.
- The match was reduced to 16 overs per side due to rain.
- Rain prevented any further play.
- Muhammad Kashif (Mashonaland Eagles) made his T20 debut.

Match 7
12 December 2025
13:45
Scorecard

Mid West Rhinos; 137/6 (20 overs)	v	Southern Rocks; 138/4 (18.5 overs)
Ben Curran 36 (34); Jalat Khan 3/16 (4 overs)		Ashley Mufandauya 67* (57); Graeme Cremer 3/23 (4 overs)

Southern Rocks won by 6 wickets
Harare Sports Club, Harare
Umpires: Iknow Chabi and Percival Sizara
Player of the match: Ashley Mufandauya (Southern Rocks)

- Mid West Rhinos won the toss and elected to bat.

Match 8
12 December 2025
18:30 (N)
Scorecard

Matabeleland Tuskers; 138/6 (20 overs)	v	Mountaineers; 140/1 (17.3 overs)
Brian Mudzinganyama 43 (37); Victor Nyauchi 2/17 (3 overs)		Nick Welch 57* (39); Ainsley Ndlovu 1/20 (4 overs)

Mountaineers won by 9 wickets
Harare Sports Club, Harare
Umpires: Forster Mutizwa and Langton Rusere
Player of the match: Nick Welch (Mountaineers)

- Matabeleland Tuskers won the toss and elected to bat.
- Muslim Khan (Matabeleland Tuskers) made his T20 debut.

Match 9
13 December 2025
13:45
Scorecard

Mashonaland Eagles; 144 (19.3 overs)	v	Mountaineers; 97 (18.4 overs)
Faraz Akram 28 (21); Wellington Masakadza 4/14 (4 overs)		Alistair Frost 44 (49); Wessly Madhevere 4/15 (4 overs)

Mashonaland Eagles won by 47 runs
Harare Sports Club, Harare
Umpires: Tafadzwa Musakwa and Forster Mutizwa
Player of the match: Wessly Madhevere (Mashonaland Eagles)

- Mountaineers won the toss and elected to field.

Match 10
13 December 2025
18:30 (N)
Scorecard

Southern Rocks; 145/6 (20 overs)	v	Matabeleland Tuskers; 89/8 (14 overs)
Roy Kaia 68 (48); Tinotenda Maposa 2/24 (4 overs)		Clive Madande 34 (26); Owen Muzondo 3/20 (2 overs)

Southern Rocks won by 29 runs (DLS method)
Harare Sports Club, Harare
Umpires: Sarah Dambanevana and Langton Rusere
Player of the match: Roy Kaia (Southern Rocks)

- Matabeleland Tuskers won the toss and elected to field.
- Matabeleland Tuskers were set a revised target of 119 runs from 14 overs due to rain.
- Lennox Chando (Matabeleland Tuskers) made his T20 debut.

Match 11
5 January 2026
09:30
Scorecard

Mid West Rhinos; 168/6 (20 overs)	v	Southern Rocks; 141/8 (20 overs)
Ben Curran 62 (45); Ali Asfand 3/20 (4 overs)		Johnathan Campbell 42* (37); Trevor Gwandu 3/27 (4 overs)

Mid West Rhinos won by 27 runs
Kwekwe Sports Club, Kwekwe
Umpires: Langton Rusere and Sarah Dambanevana
Player of the match: Ben Curran (Mid West Rhinos)

- Southern Rocks won the toss and elected to field.
- Mid West Rhinos were awarded bonus points.

Match 12
5 January 2026
13:45
Scorecard

Mountaineers; 152/6 (20 overs)	v	Matabeleland Tuskers; 80/4 (12.1 overs)
Milton Shumba 65* (54); Brian Bennett 4/26 (4 overs)		Nick Welch 42* (29); Tawanda Maposa 3/17 (3 overs)

Matabeleland Tuskers won by 9 runs (DLS method)
Kwekwe Sports Club, Kwekwe
Umpires: Stanley Gogwe and Percival Sizara
Player of the match: Tawanda Maposa (Matabeleland Tuskers)

- Matabeleland Tuskers won the toss and elected to field.
- Rain prevented any further play.
- Matabeleland Tuskers were 9 runs ahead in DLS par score when rain stopped play during the 2nd innings.

Match 13
6 January 2026
09:30
Scorecard

Mountaineers; 104/9 (20 overs)	v	Mashonaland Eagles; 105/5 (15 overs)
Brian Bennett 34 (35); Ali Hasnain 3/18 (4 overs)		Dion Myers 53* (37); Michael Frost 3/20 (4 overs)

Mashonaland Eagles won by 5 wickets
Kwekwe Sports Club, Kwekwe
Umpires: Christopher Phiri and Percival Sizara
Player of the match: Ali Hasnain (Mashonaland Eagles)

- Mashonaland Eagles won the toss and elected to field.
- Mashonaland Eagles were awarded bonus points.

Match 14
6 January 2026
13:45
Scorecard

Southern Rocks; 133/8 (20 overs)	v	Matabeleland Tuskers; 132/9 (20 overs)
Johnathan Campbell 49 (41); Tinotenda Maposa 2/21 (4 overs)		Munashe Chimusoro 46 (39); Arinesto Vezha 3/25 (3 overs)

Southern Rocks won by 1 run
Kwekwe Sports Club, Kwekwe
Umpires: Langton Rusere and Dylan Ziyambi
Player of the match: Arinesto Vezha (Southern Rocks)

- Southern Rocks won the toss and elected to bat.

Match 15
7 January 2026
09:30
Scorecard

Southern Rocks; 137/5 (20 overs)	v	Mountaineers; 50/2 (8.5 overs)
Lennox Chando 50 (44); Brian Bennett 1/10 (2 overs)		Brian Bennett 22* (16); Arinesto Vezha 1/11 (1.5 overs)

Southern Rocks won by 4 runs (DLS method)
Kwekwe Sports Club, Kwekwe
Umpires: Stanley Gogwe and Langton Rusere
Player of the match: Lennox Chando (Southern Rocks)

- Mountaineers won the toss and elected to field.
- Rain prevented any further play.
- Southern Rocks were 4 runs ahead in DLS par score when rain stopped play during the 2nd innings.

Match 16
7 January 2026
13:45
Scorecard

Mashonaland Eagles	v	Mid West Rhinos

Match abandoned
Kwekwe Sports Club, Kwekwe
Umpires: Sarah Dambanevana and Percival Sizara

- No toss.
- No play was possible due to rain.

Match 17
9 January 2026
09:30
Scorecard

Matabeleland Tuskers; 120/9 (20 overs)	v	Mashonaland Eagles; 124/3 (15.4 overs)
Clive Madande 42 (44); Faraz Akram 2/16 (2 overs)		Dion Myers 51* (43); Ainsley Ndlovu 2/12 (4 overs)

Mashonaland Eagles won by 7 wickets
Kwekwe Sports Club, Kwekwe
Umpires: Stanley Gogwe and Percival Sizara
Player of the match: Dion Myers (Mashonaland Eagles)

- Matabeleland Tuskers won the toss and elected to bat.
- Ali Khan (Matabeleland Tuskers) made his T20 debut.
- Mashonaland Eagles were awarded bonus points.

Match 18
9 January 2026
13:45
Scorecard

Mountaineers; 125/8 (20 overs)	v	Mid West Rhinos; 128/3 (15.5 overs)
Brian Bennett 39 (32); Brad Evans 3/12 (4 overs)		Brendan Taylor 59* (45); Alistair Frost 1/8 (2 overs)

Mid West Rhinos won by 7 wickets
Kwekwe Sports Club, Kwekwe
Umpires: Christopher Phiri and Langton Rusere
Player of the match: Antum Naqvi (Mid West Rhinos)

- Mountaineers won the toss and elected to bat.
- Mid West Rhinos were awarded bonus points.

Match 19
10 January 2026
09:30
Scorecard

Mid West Rhinos; 172/6 (20 overs)	v	Matabeleland Tuskers; 154/7 (20 overs)
Ben Curran 48 (31); Petros Sithole 2/19 (3 overs)		Milton Shumba 70 (58); Graeme Cremer 3/28 (4 overs)

Mid West Rhinos won by 18 runs
Kwekwe Sports Club, Kwekwe
Umpires: Langton Rusere and Percival Sizara
Player of the match: Graeme Cremer (Mid West Rhinos)

- Mid West Rhinos won the toss and elected to bat.
- Mid West Rhinos were awarded bonus points.

Match 20
10 January 2026
13:45
Scorecard

Mashonaland Eagles; 120 (16.1 overs)	v	Southern Rocks; 102 (18.4 overs)
Faraz Akram 46 (30); Jalat Khan 4/19 (3 overs)		Johnathan Campbell 25 (24); Wessly Madhevere 2/22 (2.4 overs)

Mashonaland Eagles won by 18 runs
Kwekwe Sports Club, Kwekwe
Umpires: Stanley Gogwe and Christopher Phiri
Player of the match: Faraz Akram (Mashonaland Eagles)

- Southern Rocks won the toss and elected to field.

== Final ==
Final
11 January 2026
13:45
Scorecard

Mid West Rhinos	v	Mashonaland Eagles

No result
Umpires: Langton Rusere and Percival Sizara

- Mashonaland Eagles won the toss and elected to field.
- The match was reduced to 18 overs per side due to rain.
- No play was possible due to rain.
- Mid West Rhinos won the 2025–26 Zimbabwe Domestic Twenty20 Competition by finishing top of the table in the group stage.
