= Pakistani cricket team in Zimbabwe in 2011 =

International cricket tour

Pakistan cricket team in Zimbabwe in 2011
	Pakistan	Zimbabwe
- Dates: 28 August – 18 September 2011
Captains	Misbah-ul-Haq	Brendan Taylor

Test series
- Result: Pakistan won the 1-match series 1–0
Most runs	Mohammad Hafeez (157)	Tino Mawoyo (175)
Most wickets	Aizaz Cheema (8)	Ray Price (4)
- Player of the series: Mohammad Hafeez (Pak)

One Day International series
- Results: Pakistan won the 3-match series 3–0
Most runs	Mohammad Hafeez (188); Younis Khan {159}	Vusi Sibanda (146)
Most wickets	Aizaz Cheema (8)	Elton Chigumbura (3)
- Player of the series: Younis Khan (Pak)

Twenty20 International series
- Results: Pakistan won the 2-match series 2–0
Most runs	Mohammad Hafeez (122)	Tatenda Taibu (43)
Most wickets	Mohammad Hafeez (7)	Kyle Jarvis (4)
- Player of the series: Mohammad Hafeez (Pakistan)

The Pakistan cricket team toured Zimbabwe between 28 August and 18 September 2011. Pakistan played one Test, three One Day Internationals and two Twenty20 Internationals against the Zimbabwe national team, and one first-class match against a Zimbabwean representative side.

== Squads ==
Tests		Limited overs	
Pakistan	Zimbabwe	Pakistan	Zimbabwe
Misbah-ul-Haq (c); Adnan Akmal (wk); Aizaz Cheema; Asad Shafiq; Azhar Ali; Imran Farhat; Junaid Khan; Mohammad Hafeez (vc); Rameez Raja Jr.; Saeed Ajmal; Shoaib Malik; Sohail Khan; Sohail Tanvir; Taufeeq Umar; Umar Akmal; Yasir Shah; Younis Khan	Brendan Taylor (c); Brian Vitori; Chamu Chibhabha; Chris Mpofu; Craig Ervine; Greg Lamb; Hamilton Masakadza; Kyle Jarvis; Malcolm Waller; Prosper Utseya; Ray Price; Regis Chakabva; Tino Mawoyo; Tatenda Taibu (wk); Vusi Sibanda; E Chigumbura (withdrawn)	Misbah-ul-Haq (c); Adnan Akmal (wk); Aizaz Cheema; Asad Shafiq; Azhar Ali; Imran Farhat; Junaid Khan; Mohammad Hafeez (vc); Rameez Raja Jr.; Saeed Ajmal; Shoaib Malik; Sohail Khan; Sohail Tanvir; Taufeeq Umar; Umar Akmal; Yasir Shah; Younis Khan	Brendan Taylor (c); Brian Vitori; Chamu Chibhabha; Chris Mpofu; Craig Ervine; Elton Chigumbura; Hamilton Masakadza; Kyle Jarvis; Malcolm Waller; Prosper Utseya; Ray Price; Regis Chakabva; Tatenda Taibu (wk); Vusi Sibanda

- Pakistan also named six "standby" players for the tour: Hammad Azam, Khurram Manzoor, Mohammad Talha, Sarfraz Ahmed, Sharjeel Khan and Shoaib Malik (subject to clearance from integrity committee)

== Tour match ==
=== Zimbabwe XI v Pakistanis (two-day match) ===
28–29 August 2011
Scorecard

Pakistanis	v	Zimbabwe XI
222 (75 overs); Younis Khan 71 (143); Greg Lamb 3/31 (15 overs)		225 (70.3 overs); Chamu Chibhabha 70 (125); Junaid Khan 4/62 (18 overs)
72/1 (24 overs); Mohammad Hafeez 39 (48); Cephas Zhuwao 1/25 (8 overs)

Match drawn
Bulawayo Athletic Club, Bulawayo
Umpires: Lucky Ngwenya (Zim) and Trevor Phiri (Zim)

- Zimbabwe XI won the toss and elected to field.

== Test series ==
=== Only Test ===
1–5 September 2011
Scorecard

Zimbabwe	v	Pakistan
412 (150.4 overs); Tino Mawoyo 163* (453); Aizaz Cheema 4/79 (28.4 overs)		466 (156.1 overs); Mohammad Hafeez 119 (177); Greg Lamb 3/120 (28 overs)
141 (56.3 overs); Tatenda Taibu 58 (157); Aizaz Cheema 4/24 (11.3 overs); M Hafeez 4/31 (15 overs)		88/3 (21.4 Overs); Mohammad Hafeez 38 (44); Ray Price 2/35 (10.4 overs)

Pakistan won by 7 wickets
Queens Sports Club, Bulawayo
Umpires: Ian Gould (Eng) and Rod Tucker (Aus)
Player of the match: Mohammad Hafeez (Pak)

- Pakistan won the toss and elected to field
- Junaid Khan, Aizaz Cheema (Pak) and Greg Lamb (Zim) all made their Test debuts.

== ODI series ==
=== 1st ODI ===
8 September 2011
Scorecard

Pakistan; 247/7 (50 overs)	v	Zimbabwe; 242/7 (50 overs)
Younis Khan 78 (72); Ray Price 2/39 (10 overs)		Brendan Taylor 84 (103); Aizaz Cheema 3/36 (10 overs)

Pakistan won by 5 runs
Queens Sports Club, Bulawayo
Umpires: Owen Chirombe (Zim) and Ian Gould (Eng)
Player of the match: Younis Khan (Pak)

- Pakistan won the toss and elected to bat
- Adnan Akmal and Aizaz Cheema (Pak) both made their ODI debuts.

=== 2nd ODI ===
11 September 2011
Scorecard

Zimbabwe; 225/6 (50 overs)	v	Pakistan; 228/0 (42.1 overs)
Hamilton Masakadza 68 (118); Sohail Tanvir 2/33 (10 overs)		Mohammad Hafeez 139* (146); Hamilton Masakadza 0/7 (2 over)

Pakistan won by 10 wickets
Harare Sports Club, Harare
Umpires: Russell Tiffin (Zim) and Ian Gould (Eng)
Player of the match: Mohammad Hafeez (Pak)

- Zimbabwe won the toss and elected to bat

=== 3rd ODI ===
14 September 2011
Scorecard

Pakistan; 270/5 (50 overs)	v	Zimbabwe; 242/9 (50 overs)
Younis Khan 81 (90); Elton Chigumbura 2/36 (9 overs)		Chamu Chibhabha 62 (88); Aizaz Cheema 4/43 (10 overs)

Pakistan won by 28 runs
Harare Sports Club, Harare
Umpires: Ian Gould (Eng) and Russell Tiffin (Zim)
Player of the match: Aizaz Cheema (Pakistan)

- Zimbabwe won the toss and elected to field
- Yasir Shah (Pak) made his ODI debut.

== T20 Series ==
=== 1st T20 ===
16 September 2011
Scorecard

Pakistan; 198/4 (20 overs)	v	Zimbabwe; 113 (15.2 overs)
Mohammad Hafeez 71 (48); Chamu Chibhabha 1/17 (3 overs)		Charles Coventry 30 (13); Mohammad Hafeez 4/10 (2.2 overs)

Pakistan won by 85 runs
Harare Sports Club, Harare
Umpires: Jeremiah Matibiri and Russell Tiffin (Both Zimbabwe)
Player of the match: Mohammad Hafeez (Pakistan)

- Zimbabwe won the toss and elected to field
- Aizaz Cheema, Rameez Raja and Yasir Shah (all Pakistan) and Kyle Jarvis (Zim) all made their T20I debuts.

=== 2nd T20 ===
18 September 2011
Scorecard

Pakistan; 141/7 (20 overs)	v	Zimbabwe; 136/7 (20 overs)
Mohammad Hafeez 51 (38); Kyle Jarvis 3/14 (4 overs)		Tatenda Taibu 37 (28); Mohammad Hafeez 3/11 (3 overs)

Pakistan won by 5 runs
Harare Sports Club, Harare
Umpires: Owen Chirombe (Zim) and Jeremiah Matibiri (Zim)
Player of the match: Mohammad Hafeez (pak)

- Pakistan won the toss and elected to bat
