= Brendon Timoni =

Zimbabwean cricketer (born 1995)

Personal information
- Born: 11 June 1995 (age 31); Harare, Zimbabwe
- Source: Cricinfo, 6 May 2017

Brendon Timoni (born 11 June 1995) is a Zimbabwean cricketer. He made his first-class debut for Mashonaland Eagles in the 2016–17 Logan Cup on 6 May 2017. He made his List A debut for Mashonaland Eagles in the 2017–18 Pro50 Championship on 30 April 2018. In December 2020, he was selected to play for the Eagles in the 2020–21 Logan Cup.
