= List of Twenty20 International cricket umpires =

List of umpires

This is a list of cricket umpires who have officiated in at least one men's Twenty20 International (T20I) match. As of November 2026, at least 599 umpires have officiated in a men's T20I match. (Note: Umpire details of a number of matches are not included in the Cricinfo statistics and hence are missing from this list.)

On 20 January 2019, Qatar's Shivani Mishra became the first female on-field umpire to officiate in a men's T20I when she stood in a match in the ACC Western Region T20 tournament.

In November 2020, in the second T20I between Pakistan and Zimbabwe, Pakistan's Ahsan Raza stood in his 50th men's T20I match as an on-field umpire, becoming the first umpire to reach the milestone in the format.

On 5 April 2023, New Zealand's Kim Cotton stood in her first men's T20I match between New Zealand and Sri Lanka when Sri Lanka toured New Zealand. She became the first female to officiate in a men's T20I between full members as an on-field umpire.

On 13 December 2025, during the men's T20 event in the 2025 Southeast Asian Games, Malaysia's Viswanadan Kalidas became the first umpire to officiate in 100 men's T20I matches.

== List of umpires ==
Umpire	Country	T20Is	From	To
Tony Hill	New Zealand	17	2005	2012
Billy Bowden	New Zealand	24	2005	2016
Jeremy Lloyds	England	1	2005	2005
Nigel Llong	England	32	2005	2016
Brian Jerling	South Africa	13	2005	2011
Ian Howell	South Africa	8	2005	2007
Bruce Oxenford	Australia	20	2006	2016
Bob Parry	Australia	2	2006	2007
Karl Hurter	South Africa	1	2006	2006
Marais Erasmus	South Africa	43	2006	2022
Ian Gould	England	37	2006	2016
Peter Hartley	England	3	2006	2008
Enamul Haque	Bangladesh	14	2006	2016
Nadir Shah	Bangladesh	3	2006	2011
Evan Watkin	New Zealand	3	2006	2009
Peter Parker	Australia	2	2007	2007
Rudi Koertzen	South Africa	14	2007	2010
Rockie D'Mello	Kenya	33	2007	2026
Subhash Modi	Kenya	9	2007	2010
Isaac Oyieko	Kenya	84	2007	2026
Daryl Harper	Australia	10	2007	2009
Mark Benson	England	19	2007	2009
Billy Doctrove	West Indies	17	2007	2010
Simon Taufel	Australia	34	2007	2012
Steve Davis	Australia	26	2007	2014
Asad Rauf	Pakistan	23	2007	2012
Amiesh Saheba	India	4	2007	2009
Suresh Shastri	India	1	2007	2007
Gary Baxter	New Zealand	16	2008	2014
Nadeem Ghauri	Pakistan	4	2008	2010
Zameer Haider	Pakistan	12	2008	2013
Clyde Duncan	West Indies	6	2008	2010
Darrell Hair	Australia	6	2008	2008
Paul Baldwin	England	9	2008	2010
Niels Bagh	Denmark	5	2008	2008
Sarika Prasad	Singapore	49	2008	2024
Karran Bayney	Canada	8	2008	2008
Rod Tucker	Australia	66	2009	2026
Paul Reiffel	Australia	39	2009	2026
Gamini Silva	Sri Lanka	2	2009	2009
Tyron Wijewardene	Sri Lanka	7	2009	2012
Norman Malcolm	West Indies	7	2009	2011
Aleem Dar	Pakistan	72	2009	2024
Asoka de Silva	Sri Lanka	11	2009	2012
Richard Kettleborough	England	46	2009	2026
Kumar Dharmasena	Sri Lanka	52	2009	2026
Shavir Tarapore	India	3	2009	2010
Sanjay Hazare	India	1	2009	2009
Ranmore Martinesz	Sri Lanka	29	2010	2018
Chris Gaffaney	New Zealand	57	2010	2026
Jeff Luck	Namibia	6	2010	2022
Owen Chirombe	Zimbabwe	8	2010	2013
Russell Tiffin	Zimbabwe	21	2010	2018
Richard Illingworth	England	43	2010	2026
Johan Cloete	South Africa	23	2010	2016
Shaun George	South Africa	50	2010	2023
Ahsan Raza	Pakistan	91	2010	2026
Barry Frost	New Zealand	3	2010	2012
Simon Fry	Australia	19	2011	2019
Peter Nero	West Indies	12	2011	2014
Ruchira Palliyaguruge	Sri Lanka	56	2011	2025
Rob Bailey	England	18	2011	2018
Jeremiah Matibiri	Zimbabwe	15	2011	2018
Adrian Holdstock	South Africa	60	2011	2026
Sudhir Asnani	India	4	2011	2012
Sundaram Ravi	India	32	2011	2024
Sharfuddoula	Bangladesh	60	2011	2026
David Odhiambo	Kenya	72	2012	2026
Shozab Raza	Pakistan	37	2012	2021
Joel Wilson	West Indies	50	2012	2024
Mark Hawthorne	Ireland	29	2012	2025
Buddhi Pradhan	Nepal	85	2012	2026
Gregory Brathwaite	West Indies	64	2012	2025
Richard Smith	Ireland	6	2012	2012
Ian Ramage	Scotland	7	2012	2018
Vineet Kulkarni	India	14	2012	2016
Anisur Rahman	Bangladesh	13	2012	2018
Chettithody Shamshuddin	India	21	2012	2020
John Ward	Australia	8	2013	2016
Derek Walker	New Zealand	8	2013	2016
Tim Robinson	England	12	2013	2018
Raveendra Wimalasiri	Sri Lanka	53	2013	2026
Michael Gough	England	28	2013	2024
Anil Chaudhary	India	44	2013	2023
Paul Wilson	Australia	26	2014	2022
Nigel Duguid	West Indies	46	2014	2024
Mick Martell	Australia	4	2014	2017
Ahmed Shahab	Pakistan	9	2014	2018
Langton Rusere	Zimbabwe	93	2015	2026
CK Nandan	India	18	2015	2019
Phil Jones	New Zealand	3	2016	2016
Tabarak Dar	Hong Kong	67	2016	2026
Iftikhar Ali	United Arab Emirates	15	2016	2021
Rabiul Hoque	United Arab Emirates	1	2016	2016
Akbar Ali	United Arab Emirates	67	2016	2026
Leslie Reifer	West Indies	52	2016	2026
Alan Neill	Ireland	20	2016	2021
Roland Black	Ireland	47	2016	2026
Ahmed Shah Durrani	Afghanistan	34	2016	2026
Shaun Haig	New Zealand	60	2017	2026
Wayne Knights	New Zealand	62	2017	2026
Chris Brown	New Zealand	76	2017	2026
Ahmed Shah Pakteen	Afghanistan	47	2017	2026
Alex Dowdalls	Scotland	6	2017	2018
Bongani Jele	South Africa	43	2017	2026
Nitin Menon	India	64	2017	2026
Sam Nogajski	Australia	39	2017	2026
Bismillah Jan Shinwari	Afghanistan	21	2018	2024
Izatullah Safi	Afghanistan	30	2018	2026
Gerard Abood	Australia	11	2018	2024
Masudur Rahman	Bangladesh	53	2018	2026
Allahudien Paleker	South Africa	73	2018	2026
Lyndon Hannibal	Sri Lanka	24	2018	2024
Alex Wharf	England	52	2018	2026
Rizwan Akram	Netherlands	69	2018	2026
Allan Haggo	Scotland	27	2018	2023
Pim van Liemt	Netherlands	18	2018	2024
Huub Jansen	Netherlands	8	2018	2019
Iknow Chabi	Zimbabwe	73	2018	2026
Paul Reynolds	Ireland	12	2018	2023
Asif Yaqoob	Pakistan	40	2018	2026
Rashid Riaz	Pakistan	55	2018	2026
Tanvir Ahmed	Bangladesh	33	2018	2026
Gazi Sohel	Bangladesh	50	2018	2026
Afzalkhan Pathan	Oman	9	2019	2020
Zahid Usman	Kuwait	10	2019	2024
Shivani Mishra	Qatar	24	2019	2024
Vinod Babu	Oman	36	2019	2025
Osama Saad Alnadwi	Saudi Arabia	9	2019	2024
Rahul Asher	Oman	64	2019	2025
Shiju Sam	United Arab Emirates	57	2019	2026
Viswanadan Kalidas	Malaysia	117	2019	2026
Alu Kapa	Papua New Guinea	9	2019	2023
Adnan Khan	Spain	36	2019	2026
Harmit Dhull	Spain	4	2019	2020
Ken Patel	Canada	5	2019	2019
Supratim Das	Mexico	2	2019	2019
Bob Baxter	Mexico	4	2019	2019
Dilip Pachichigar	Mexico	2	2019	2019
Amol Bhatt	Canada	12	2019	2025
Andrew Scott	Belgium	3	2019	2019
Mark Jameson	Germany	61	2019	2026
Andrew Louw	Namibia	43	2019	2026
Kehinde Olanbiwonnu	Nigeria	27	2019	2026
Emmanuel Byiringiro	Rwanda	3	2019	2019
Adriaan van den Dries	Netherlands	30	2019	2022
Martin Tolcher	Guernsey	4	2019	2026
Neil Hall	Guernsey	2	2019	2019
Richard Veillard	Guernsey	14	2019	2026
Robin Stockton	Jersey	5	2019	2025
Simon Welch	Guernsey	1	2019	2019
Mary Waldron	Ireland	6	2019	2019
Heath Kearns	Jersey	18	2019	2023
Mathan Kumar	Malaysia	12	2019	2026
Shafizan Shahriman	Malaysia	1	2019	2019
Loganathan Poobalan	Malaysia	17	2019	2026
Zaidan Taha	Malaysia	6	2019	2023
Izmir Azraf	Malaysia	3	2019	2025
Narayanan Sivan	Malaysia	51	2019	2026
Mohammad Nasim	Qatar	18	2019	2026
Riyaz Kurupkar	Qatar	13	2019	2025
Mervyn McGoon	Fiji	6	2019	2019
Mac Markia	Vanuatu	2	2019	2019
Uanase Aloniu	Samoa	1	2019	2019
Bri Olewale	Papua New Guinea	9	2019	2022
Uala Kaisala	Samoa	2	2019	2019
Denish Sevakumaran	Malaysia	13	2019	2025
Jesper Jensen	Denmark	26	2019	2026
Sriharsha Kuchimanchi	Finland	20	2019	2022
Srinidhi Ravindra	Finland	56	2019	2026
Humayun Mughal	Finland	2	2019	2019
Harry Grewal	Canada	21	2019	2024
Emmerson Carrington	Bermuda	22	2019	2023
Jacqueline Williams	West Indies	19	2019	2023
Claude Thorburn	Namibia	11	2019	2021
Marthinus Louw	Namibia	4	2019	2021
Claus Schumacher	Namibia	41	2019	2026
Thomas Kentorp	Denmark	10	2019	2019
Andrew Begg	Romania	16	2019	2025
Prageeth Rambukwella	Sri Lanka	28	2019	2026
David McLean	Scotland	32	2019	2026
Anand Natarajan	Singapore	25	2019	2026
Hardeep Jadeja	Singapore	23	2019	2025
Balraj Manikandan	Singapore	5	2019	2020
Rudy Ismandy	Malaysia	25	2019	2026
Senthil Kumar	Singapore	16	2019	2026
Oscar Andrade	Bermuda	8	2019	2025
Sandeep Harnal	Canada	18	2019	2023
Rakesh Jain	Peru	4	2019	2019
Ashish Shah	Canada	2	2019	2019
Deepak Kumar	Canada	4	2019	2019
Harikrishna Pillai	Oman	31	2019	2025
Prassanna Haran	Qatar	2	2019	2020
Abdul Jabbar	Qatar	9	2019	2025
Muhammad Usman	Qatar	8	2019	2026
Ioannis Afthinos	Greece	9	2019	2021
Ruban Sivanadian	Malta	12	2019	2022
Les White	Malta	3	2019	2021
Rahan Patel	Greece	1	2019	2019
Sunil Chandiramani	Gibraltar	18	2019	2026
Gordon Ashford	Spain	10	2019	2023
Shawn Craig	Australia	16	2019	2025
Acacio Chitsondzo	Mozambique	24	2019	2025
Osman Mhango	Malawi	24	2019	2026
Deepal Gunawardene	Sri Lanka	4	2019	2019
Virender Sharma	India	26	2020	2026
Patrick Gustard	West Indies	22	2020	2024
Imran Mustafa	Kuwait	12	2020	2023
Anantha Rajamani	Oman	10	2020	2022
Rahat Ali	Saudi Arabia	17	2020	2024
Mohammed Younis	Bahrain	7	2020	2023
Nasir Ali	Malaysia	13	2020	2026
Sanjay Sarda	Thailand	1	2020	2020
Ashwani Kumar Rana	Thailand	22	2020	2026
Samad Akbar	Thailand	29	2020	2026
Sanjay Gurung	Nepal	10	2020	2023
Arif Ansari	Thailand	10	2020	2024
Carl Brooks	Guernsey	2	2020	2025
Mark Savage	Guernsey	1	2020	2020
Jahan Gir Jhan	Belgium	9	2020	2022
Mike Burns	England	32	2020	2026
Ben Lougheed	Luxembourg	3	2020	2020
Peter Vincent	Czech Republic	8	2020	2023
David Millns	England	12	2020	2023
Martin Saggers	England	28	2020	2026
Nisarg Shah	Bulgaria	6	2020	2021
Subhas Roy	Malta	3	2020	2020
Ivan Dimitrov	Bulgaria	21	2020	2025
Syed Atif Naqvi	Romania	10	2020	2024
Dharmendra Manani	Romania	11	2020	2025
Taranjeet Singh	Romania	2	2020	2020
Aravinda De Silva	Bulgaria	1	2020	2020
KN Ananthapadmanabhan	India	28	2021	2026
Durga Subedi	Nepal	37	2021	2026
Himal Giri	Nepal	1	2021	2021
Vinay Kumar Jha	Nepal	22	2021	2026
Steve Tripp	Belgium	15	2021	2022
Joe Foster	Czech Republic	7	2021	2025
Sudeep Thakur	Romania	1	2021	2021
Stefan Nerandzic	Serbia	5	2021	2021
Abdul Rahman	Malta	7	2021	2025
Tim Wheeler	Malta	7	2021	2022
Ghose Roy	Malta	10	2021	2022
Aaftab Alam Khan	Malta	3	2021	2021
Christopher Phiri	Zimbabwe	22	2021	2023
Forster Mutizwa	Zimbabwe	57	2021	2026
Rehman Hussain	Belgium	2	2021	2022
Shashidhar Gunna	Belgium	3	2021	2024
Jason Flannery	Germany	7	2021	2023
Vinay Malhotra	Germany	55	2021	2026
Allan From	Denmark	7	2021	2023
Munib Haq	Denmark	10	2021	2026
Eric Dusabemungu	Rwanda	17	2021	2023
Itangishaka Olivier	Rwanda	23	2021	2022
Gasana Christian	Rwanda	32	2021	2026
Vicky Prajapati	Rwanda	8	2021	2023
Naeem Akhtar	Portugal	10	2021	2025
Parth Jounjat	Portugal	4	2021	2021
Jari Schabel	Finland	2	2021	2021
Sumanta Samanta	Finland	6	2021	2026
Arun Chandrasekaran	Romania	1	2021	2021
Abhay Malyan	Romania	3	2021	2021
Eric Wandera	Uganda	8	2021	2024
Patric Makumbi	Uganda	57	2021	2026
Darrin Clark	Spain	10	2021	2023
Baker Elonge	Uganda	4	2021	2021
Simon Kintu	Uganda	23	2021	2025
Steve Ross	England	7	2021	2024
Suleman Saeed	Italy	11	2021	2026
Tim Heath	Estonia	3	2021	2021
Tom Smith	Cyprus	7	2021	2024
Aasif Iqbal	United Arab Emirates	35	2021	2026
Nitin Bathi	Netherlands	42	2021	2026
Eugene King	Nigeria	2	2021	2021
Andrew Naudi	Malta	5	2021	2022
Tony Slater	Malta	2	2021	2021
Ashok Bishnoi	Malta	1	2021	2021
John Grima	Malta	3	2021	2021
Oluwole Compagnie-Coker	Sierra Leone	3	2021	2021
Jitesh Patel	Malta	3	2021	2021
Temitope Onikoyi	Nigeria	11	2021	2026
Arnold Maddela	Canada	48	2021	2026
Vijaya Mallela	United States	35	2021	2024
Habib Enesi	Nigeria	44	2021	2026
Jayaraman Madanagopal	India	39	2021	2026
Sameer Bandekar	United States	7	2021	2024
Jermaine Lindo	United States	26	2021	2026
Donovan Koch	Australia	25	2022	2026
Livingstone Bailey	Cayman Islands	3	2022	2025
Leon Watson	Cayman Islands	6	2022	2025
Derrick Williams	Cayman Islands	4	2022	2026
Courtney Young	Cayman Islands	4	2022	2025
Ezra Hewitt	Cayman Islands	3	2022	2022
Andrew Elliott	England	32	2022	2026
Atif Jamal	Denmark	7	2022	2024
Andreas Krengel	Denmark	2	2022	2024
Shubh Anand	Hungary	16	2022	2025
Jeremy Sharratt	Guernsey	1	2022	2022
Mike Savage	Guernsey	1	2022	2022
Aravindan Ganeshan	Austria	3	2022	2022
Gursewak Singh	Austria	1	2022	2022
Sunil Gowda	Germany	29	2022	2026
Richard Eames	Luxembourg	6	2022	2023
Sri Kolla	Luxembourg	4	2022	2023
Arun Kumar	Germany	2	2022	2022
Umair Butt	Belgium	2	2022	2024
Clyde Johnston	Estonia	2	2022	2022
Debasish Roy	Finland	2	2022	2024
Aditya Alur	Finland	1	2022	2022
Velguo Vilimonovic	Serbia	4	2022	2022
Jonathan Kennedy	Ireland	26	2022	2026
Ryan Milne	Scotland	12	2022	2025
Jareth McCready	Ireland	11	2022	2024
Reshanth Selvaratnam	Singapore	1	2022	2022
Sathish Balasubramaniam	Singapore	7	2022	2026
Pramesh Parab	Singapore	1	2022	2022
Chris Tebb	Czech Republic	4	2022	2022
Dragan Djokic	Serbia	3	2022	2022
Shanaka Fernando	Italy	19	2022	2025
Sumaila Muguaua	Mozambique	6	2022	2022
Zia Uddin	Eswatini	6	2022	2022
Azad KR	Oman	12	2022	2023
Naveen D'Souza	Kuwait	1	2022	2022
Charles Kariuki	Kenya	28	2022	2026
Nicholas Otieno	Kenya	6	2022	2024
Joseph Karuri	Kenya	11	2022	2024
Shantilal Patel	Kenya	1	2022	2022
Pankaj Patki	Philippines	7	2022	2022
Claire Polosak	Australia	12	2022	2023
Merielle Kenni	Vanuatu	10	2022	2024
John Mayeku	Uganda	36	2022	2026
Machiel Moller	South Africa	11	2022	2023
Faisal Afridi	Pakistan	30	2022	2026
Phillip Gillespie	Australia	38	2022	2026
Adam Birss	Japan	9	2022	2025
Chris Thurgate	Japan	18	2022	2026
Michael Graham-Smith	Australia	4	2022	2024
Suresh Subramanian	Indonesia	25	2022	2026
Hozeiph Bhaloo	Tanzania	1	2022	2022
Nilkesh Patel	Spain	6	2022	2024
Adil Kassam	Tanzania	13	2022	2026
Mujahid Surve	Oman	4	2022	2022
Brad White	South Africa	6	2022	2022
Lauren Agenbag	South Africa	11	2022	2023
Stephen Harris	South Africa	33	2022	2026
Mark Chappell	Spain	15	2023	2025
Shiroy Vachha	Hong Kong	2	2023	2024
John Prakash	Hong Kong	29	2023	2026
Niaz Ali	Hong Kong	7	2023	2026
Gandhimathinathan Sankaranarayanan	Hong Kong	2	2023	2023
Shelton D'Cruz	Hong Kong	16	2023	2026
Sean Campbell	Australia	2	2023	2023
Tomakanute Ritawa	Cook Islands	1	2023	2023
Rana Stevens	New Zealand	2	2023	2023
Kim Cotton	New Zealand	13	2023	2026
Richard Cunningham	Gibraltar	8	2023	2024
Hitesh Sharma	Philippines	13	2023	2025
Riaz Ur Rahman	Indonesia	14	2023	2026
Yousuf Wadu	Indonesia	22	2023	2025
Sebastian Maynard	Spain	7	2023	2024
Jeremy Perez	Gibraltar	5	2023	2024
Tayo Atoloye	Gibraltar	7	2023	2023
Steve Mumford	Gibraltar	4	2023	2023
Fareedoon Bhatti	Norway	6	2023	2023
Ashish Saini	Sweden	5	2023	2025
Alpheus Gawe	South Africa	10	2023	2023
Gert van Wyk	South Africa	7	2023	2023
Ragava Lokasani	Czech Republic	5	2023	2025
Basil Biju	England	5	2023	2023
Sam Ranjan	Ireland	5	2023	2023
Abraham Koshy	Luxembourg	1	2023	2023
Martin Hancock	Netherlands	3	2023	2023
Malcolm Green	Isle of Man	2	2023	2023
Michael Glenn	Isle of Man	2	2023	2023
David Kenworthy	Isle of Man	2	2023	2023
Djiewan Kalloe	Netherlands	4	2023	2023
Jan Hilhorst	Netherlands	5	2023	2023
Venkatesh Sridhara	Germany	8	2023	2025
Ramasamy Venkatesh	Hong Kong	21	2023	2026
Vrinda Rathi	India	14	2023	2024
Sai Gowtham	Hungary	2	2023	2023
Srinivas Mandali	Hungary	2	2023	2023
Adwait Deshpande	Netherlands	2	2023	2023
Maulik Prabhudesai	Netherlands	9	2023	2026
Matt French	England	5	2023	2023
Gaston Niyibizi	Rwanda	32	2023	2026
Norbert Abii	Uganda	7	2023	2023
Veronique Iriho	Rwanda	6	2023	2023
Jean Siboniyo	Rwanda	5	2023	2023
Lubabalo Gcuma	South Africa	30	2023	2026
Mahmood Kharoti	Afghanistan	7	2023	2023
Liu Jingmin	China	1	2023	2023
Olumide Akintokun	Nigeria	6	2023	2023
Wale Adeoye	Nigeria	1	2023	2023
Musa Bodie	Nigeria	5	2023	2023
Taiwo Oladunjoye	Nigeria	5	2023	2023
Ibrahim Kabia	Sierra Leone	4	2023	2023
Olawale Adekoya	Nigeria	13	2023	2026
Mark McCormack	Bermuda	1	2023	2023
Precious Smith	Bermuda	5	2023	2026
Steven Caines	Bermuda	1	2023	2023
Ewoud Lassen	Namibia	28	2023	2026
Geda Suda Arsa	Indonesia	23	2023	2026
Edi Agustinus	Indonesia	6	2023	2024
Sarah Dambanevana	Zimbabwe	10	2023	2024
Rohan Pandit	India	16	2023	2026
Kobus Conradie	South Africa	5	2023	2023
Cecil Rabie	South Africa	5	2023	2023
Frengky Shony	Indonesia	16	2023	2025
Melattur Krishnakumar	Maldives	3	2024	2024
Dorji Loday	Bhutan	7	2024	2024
KB Suresh	Thailand	4	2024	2024
Tauseef Khalid	Thailand	7	2024	2026
Jayanth Babu	Hong Kong	1	2024	2024
Sanjeev Jeyasooriyam	Thailand	5	2024	2026
Abdul Salam	Qatar	4	2024	2026
Tahir Mehmood	Qatar	6	2024	2026
Zaman Quoraishi	Oman	1	2024	2024
Gopakumar Pillai	Oman	6	2024	2024
Parameswaran Balasubramanian	Oman	1	2024	2024
Percival Sizara	Zimbabwe	22	2024	2026
Musa Twala	Eswatini	5	2024	2024
Zenzele Mazibuko	Eswatini	9	2024	2025
Aditya Gajjar	United States	29	2024	2026
Rohan Shah	Canada	35	2024	2026
Morshed Ali Khan	Bangladesh	35	2024	2026
Tariq Rasheed	Pakistan	4	2024	2024
Naresh D'Souza	Kuwait	3	2024	2024
Rob Newman	Japan	7	2024	2026
Atif Zahir	France	5	2024	2024
Niaz Chaudhry	Pakistan	6	2024	2024
Waseem Dar	Spain	3	2024	2024
Dhakshinamoorthy Natarajan	Japan	8	2024	2026
Aidan Seaver	Ireland	14	2024	2026
Isfahan Doekhie	Netherlands	2	2024	2024
Allala Santhosh	Austria	2	2024	2024
Rajinder Kumar	Austria	3	2024	2024
Lenin Durairaj	Austria	3	2024	2024
Moiz Ali Syed	Belgium	5	2024	2025
Ramraj Venkataramanan	Belgium	3	2024	2025
Adeel Ashiq	Italy	8	2024	2024
Vishal Ramteke	Belgium	2	2024	2025
Iain McDonald	Scotland	21	2024	2026
Tharindu Koralage	Finland	3	2024	2026
Paul Burdekin	England	3	2024	2024
Sujith Thennakoon	Cyprus	5	2024	2026
Windy Miller	Cyprus	1	2024	2024
Johannes Vosser	Jersey	3	2024	2024
Mike Kinder	Guernsey	5	2024	2026
Rizwan Zahoor	Slovenia	3	2024	2024
Shiva Mani	Slovenia	2	2024	2024
Asgarali Kassam	Kenya	4	2024	2024
Omkarnath Thunduru	Slovenia	1	2024	2024
Shashikant Sanghani	Kenya	5	2024	2026
Benard Agutu	Kenya	2	2024	2024
Dennis Angara	Kenya	1	2024	2024
Rajesh Pillai	Kenya	3	2024	2026
Dhananjay Singh	Croatia	10	2024	2025
Lisa McCabe	Australia	5	2024	2024
Lakani Oala	Papua New Guinea	5	2024	2024
Mudassar Rasool	Kuwait	5	2024	2024
Azam Baig	Ireland	9	2024	2024
Anna Harris	England	8	2024	2024
Russell Warren	England	22	2024	2026
Steve Wood	Ireland	7	2024	2024
Kerrin Klaaste	South Africa	4	2024	2024
Arsalaan Premji	Tanzania	3	2024	2024
Shahid Gill	South Korea	2	2024	2024
Alex Knight	West Indies	2	2024	2024
Paul Anjere	Kenya	1	2024	2024
Ashok Kumar Rai	Bhutan	12	2024	2025
Om Nath Pradhan	Bhutan	9	2024	2025
Ugyen Dorji	Bhutan	16	2024	2026
Sharon Athuola	Uganda	1	2024	2024
Zahid Bassarath	West Indies	18	2024	2026
Arno Jacobs	South Africa	12	2024	2026
Deighton Butler	West Indies	16	2024	2026
Aye Min Than	Myanmar	9	2024	2025
Damascene Hagenimana	Rwanda	13	2024	2025
Candace la Borde	West Indies	9	2024	2024
Maria Abbott	West Indies	9	2024	2024
Asim Mehmood	Bahrain	5	2024	2024
Soni Hawoe	Indonesia	11	2025	2026
Yeri Rosongna	Indonesia	8	2025	2025
Foyej Ahmed	Singapore	6	2025	2025
Venu Madhav	Singapore	6	2025	2026
Subbiah Ramesh	Singapore	2	2025	2025
Elangovan Rajvengadesh	Singapore	2	2025	2025
Oswald Sam Arthur	Costa Rica	9	2025	2026
Andrew Winter	Portugal	2	2025	2025
Krut Patel	Portugal	2	2025	2025
Sushil Bhakta	Panama	4	2025	2026
Dexter Smith	Bermuda	4	2025	2025
Muhunthan Thetchanamurthy	Canada	4	2025	2025
Umesh Ahir	Panama	1	2025	2025
Narendra Ekanayake	The Bahamas	7	2025	2026
Paul Manning	Cayman Islands	8	2025	2026
Vipin Sukhwal	Japan	4	2025	2026
Mumtaz Alam	Japan	3	2025	2026
Sagir Parkar	Japan	2	2025	2025
Dilip Kumar Chamunni	Austria	2	2025	2025
Pamir Zarawar Khan	Austria	7	2025	2025
Ashtiaq Shah	Austria	5	2025	2025
Pawan Kohli	Austria	5	2025	2025
Graham Lloyd	England	8	2025	2026
George Thomas	Jersey	2	2025	2025
Charles Croucher	Czech Republic	7	2025	2025
Farooq Shaik	Czech Republic	2	2025	2025
Anwesh Bose	Indonesia	12	2025	2026
Bijal Patel	Canada	2	2025	2025
Bikash Timilsena	Denmark	2	2025	2025
Bilal Munir	Sweden	13	2025	2026
Ishaq Saqi	Norway	4	2025	2025
Mandar Sathe	Switzerland	13	2025	2026
Vikrant Naik	Luxembourg	1	2025	2025
Prachir Gupta	Luxembourg	1	2025	2025
Vijay Subramanian	Luxembourg	1	2025	2025
Imran Haider	Romania	20	2025	2026
Nishant Devre	Romania	3	2025	2025
Abdul Shakoor	Romania	1	2025	2025
Ravinder Gill	Romania	1	2025	2025
Mazizi Gampu	South Africa	6	2025	2025
Siphelele Gasa	South Africa	6	2025	2025
Kush Narayan	Bulgaria	5	2025	2025
Sathish Ayyappath	Ireland	3	2025	2025
Remy Singizwa	Rwanda	14	2025	2026
James Bamulese	Uganda	3	2025	2025
James Lloyd	Hungary	6	2025	2025
György Takács	Hungary	4	2025	2025
Steve Anthony	Hungary	6	2025	2025
Dheeraj Gaikwad	Hungary	3	2025	2025
Ajay Jaiswal	Hungary	4	2025	2025
Achal Arvind	Switzerland	3	2025	2025
Venkatraghavan Seeshadri	Finland	3	2025	2026
Usman Afzal	Sweden	6	2025	2026
Vedran Zanko	Croatia	3	2025	2025
Madhava Rao	Sweden	11	2025	2026
Ahmad Ali	Norway	2	2025	2025
Sachin Singh	Norway	1	2025	2025
Abhishek Dhaniwal	Norway	1	2025	2025
Ashis Patro	Norway	1	2025	2025
Usman Sahi	Norway	1	2025	2025
Sukesh Prudhvi	Romania	1	2025	2025
Abdul Subor Haydari	Austria	3	2025	2025
Amir Javed	Austria	2	2025	2025
Sanjay Kumar	Hungary	2	2025	2025
Peter Finch	Guernsey	2	2025	2026
Onesimus Koilraj	Switzerland	1	2025	2025
Paul Barnett	Isle of Man	2	2025	2025
Peter Foxton	Isle of Man	2	2025	2025
Sohail Khan	Eswatini	3	2025	2025
Cory Black	New Zealand	8	2025	2026
Paresh Tailor	Canada	3	2025	2025
Mark Duffy	Cyprus	20	2025	2026
Abdul Rahman	Cyprus	4	2025	2026
Febri Irwanto	Indonesia	9	2025	2026
I Kadek Adi Wijaya Kusuma	Indonesia	7	2025	2026
Wellingson	Indonesia	6	2025	2025
Faheem Butt	Indonesia	6	2025	2025
Asghar Ali Bhatti	Qatar	2	2025	2025
Ashafa Modupe	Nigeria	6	2025	2025
Ramon Adelakun	Nigeria	6	2025	2025
Ijaz Hussain	Spain	6	2025	2025
Chamara de Soysa	Sri Lanka	2	2026	2026
Ravindra Kottahachchi	Sri Lanka	5	2026	2026
Hemantha Boteju	Sri Lanka	2	2026	2026
Muhammad Sabir	Afghanistan	1	2026	2026
Nasir Hussain	Pakistan	3	2026	2026
Shailesh Gajanan	Qatar	1	2026	2026
Sajid Ullah	Qatar	1	2026	2026
Mohamed Rilas Abubacker	Qatar	1	2026	2026
Harminder Pal Singh	Thailand	1	2026	2026
Laura Mophakedi	Botswana	3	2026	2026
Obert Musiyamanje	Botswana	2	2026	2026
Imran Zakir	Botswana	3	2026	2026
Johannes Mukandi	Botswana	2	2026	2026
Pankaj Parvesh	Cyprus	2	2026	2026
Govardhan Vasanth	Mexico	10	2026	2026
Chirag Vaswani	United States	20	2026	2026
Harish Kumar	Mexico	4	2026	2026
Paul Robinson	Guernsey	1	2026	2026
Nikhil Dhanawade	Germany	4	2026	2026
Gareth Morrison	Ireland	9	2026	2026
Ravi Angara	Botswana	5	2026	2026
Justine Muzungu	Botswana	10	2026	2026
Kamran Zia	Sweden	3	2026	2026
Christopher Taylor	West Indies	1	2026	2026
Zeb Pirzada	Denmark	1	2026	2026
Vijaya Sinha	Singapore	3	2026	2026
Asad Ali	Italy	5	2026	2026
Ankit Patel	Panama	1	2026	2026
David Shawane	Zimbabwe	5	2026	2026
Farooq Khan	Afghanistan	3	2026	2026
James Middlebrook	England	1	2026	2026
Rob White	England	1	2026	2026
Zitroy Robertson	Cayman Islands	3	2026	2026
Omar Willis	Cayman Islands	3	2026	2026
Marvelous Oyivwi	Nigeria	1	2026	2026
Alan Dawson	Falkland Islands	5	2026	2026
