= Mduduzi Fuzwayo =

Zimbabwean cricketer (1986–2023)

Personal information
- Born: 22 December 1986; Bulawayo, Zimbabwe
- Died: 8 January 2023 (aged 36)
- Source: Cricinfo, 17 May 2017

Mduduzi Fuzwayo (22 December 1986 – 8 January 2023) was a Zimbabwean cricketer. He made his first-class debut for Matabeleland Tuskers in the 2016–17 Logan Cup on 17 May 2017.

Fuzwayo died following a traffic collision on 8 January 2023, at the age of 36.
