= James Bruce (Zimbabwean cricketer) =

Zimbabwean cricketer (born 1993)

Personal information
- Full name: James Michael Bruce
- Born: 17 June 1993 (age 33); Harare, Zimbabwe
- Batting: Left-handed
- Bowling: Left-arm medium-fast
- Role: Batsman
- Source: Cricinfo, 19 April 2017

James Bruce (born 17 June 1993) is a Zimbabwean cricketer. He made his first-class debut for Mid West Rhinos in the 2016–17 Logan Cup on 19 April 2017. His main claim to fame is his batting, but he can also contribute with his left-arm medium-pace bowling.
