= Clive Chitumba =

Zimbabwean cricketer (born 1995)

Personal information
- Born: 11 February 1995 (age 31)
- Source: Cricinfo, 6 May 2017

Clive Chitumba (born 11 February 1995) is a Zimbabwean cricketer. He made his first-class debut for Mountaineers in the 2016–17 Logan Cup on 6 May 2017. He made his List A debut for Mountaineers in the 2016–17 Pro50 Championship on 2 June 2017. In December 2020, he was selected to play for the Mountaineers in the 2020–21 Logan Cup. He made his Twenty20 debut on 16 April 2021, for Mountaineers, in the 2020–21 Zimbabwe Domestic Twenty20 Competition.
