= Brian Vitori =

Zimbabwean cricketer (born 1990)

Personal information
- Full name: Brian Vitalis Vitori
- Born: 22 February 1990 (age 36); Masvingo, Zimbabwe
- Batting: Left-handed
- Bowling: Left-arm fast-medium
- Role: Bowler

International information
- National side: Zimbabwe
- Test debut (cap 78): 4 August 2011 v Bangladesh
- Last Test: 10 September 2013 v Pakistan
- ODI debut (cap 111): 12 August 2011 v Bangladesh
- Last ODI: 11 February 2018 v Afghanistan

Domestic team information
- Years: Team
- 2006: Masvingo
- 2008: Southerns
- 2009: Centrals
- 2009–11: Southern Rocks

Career statistics
Competition	Test	ODI	FC	LA
Matches	4	13	27	33
Runs scored	52	32	256	61
Batting average	10.40	5.33	9.48	7.62
100s/50s	0/0	0/0	0/1	0/0
Top score	19*	17	71	17
Balls bowled	833	688	3,753	1,467
Wickets	12	22	70	51
Bowling average	38.66	27.27	32,82	23.13
5 wickets in innings	1	2	4	4
10 wickets in match	0	0	0	0
Best bowling	5/61	5/20	6/55	5/20
Catches/stumpings	2/–	1/–	6/–	5/–
- Source: Cricinfo, 14 September 2013

Brian Vitalis Vitori (born 22 February 1990) is a Zimbabwean cricketer. He has played Test and ODI matches for Zimbabwe.

== Domestic career ==
Vitori made his List A debut for Masvingo during the 2005–06 Faithwear Clothing Inter-Provincial Competition, playing in all three of Masvingo's games, taking three wickets at an average of 12.00.

He switched to Southerns for the 2007–08 Logan Cup after the first reorganisation of cricket in Zimbabwe. He made his first-class debut for Southerns against Easterns in April 2008, taking 2/37 in Easterns' only innings. He also played his first, and to date only, Twenty20 match for Southerns against Westerns, taking 1/14 and making three runs.

He took the most wickets in the 2016–17 Pro50 Championship, with twenty dismissals in six matches.

== International career ==
=== Debut years ===
Vitori made his Test debut for Zimbabwe against Bangladesh at Harare Sports Club on 4 August 2011, taking five wickets, including 4/66 in the first innings.

He made his ODI debut, also against Bangladesh at Harare Sports Club, on 12 August 2011, taking 5/30 on debut, the best bowling figures by a Zimbabwean player on debut, and the sixth-best overall. He also took a five-wicket haul in his second match, taking 5/20 to become the first ever ODI player to take two five-wicket hauls in his first two matches. He also became the first player to be named man of the match in his first two games.

The following series with Pakistan was very disappointing for him, as Pakistanis worked him for cover drives and pull shots and he took only one wicket the tour with figures of 0/103 & 0/15 in the only Test and 0/43 & 1/62 in the ODIs. Rameez Raja suggested him to keep the in-dipper as a surprise delivery.

=== Bowling action ===
Vitori was originally suspended from bowling in January 2016, but he was reassessed and permitted to resume bowling in June 2016. He was again reported on 29 November 2016 and was subsequently suspended for 12 months in December 2016 after an independent assessment revealed he had employed an illegal bowling action. On 8 January 2018, Vitori underwent a reassessment of his bowling action at the High Performance Centre in Pretoria where it was revealed that the amount of elbow extension in his bowling action for all his deliveries was within the 15-degree level of tolerance permitted under the ICC Illegal Bowling Regulations. On 19 January 2018 he was declared completely free to return to bowling in international cricket.

During the 2018 World Cup Qualifier tournament, Vitori was again reported for an illegal action and, after assessment, he was suspended from bowling.
