= Tatenda Mupunga =

Zimbabwean cricketer (born 1987)

Personal information
- Born: 24 April 1987 (age 39); Harare, Zimbabwe
- Source: ESPNcricinfo, 24 July 2016

Tatenda Mupunga (born 24 April 1987) is a Zimbabwean cricketer who has played for Mashonaland Eagles and Mountaineers.
