= Gerald Aliseni =

Zimbabwe cricketer (born 1988)

Personal information
- Full name: Gerald Tendaishe Aliseni
- Born: 29 February 1988 (age 38); Makonde
- Batting: Right-handed
- Bowling: Right-arm medium-fast
- Role: Bowler

Career statistics
Competition	FC	LA	T20
Matches	6	4	1
Runs scored	17	1	–
Batting average	2.42	1.00	–
100s/50s	0/0	0/0	–
Top score	10	1*	–
Balls bowled	722	90	12
Wickets	18	1	0
Bowling average	22.94	86.00	–
5 wickets in innings	0	0	–
10 wickets in match	0	0	–
Best bowling	4/36	1/30	–
Catches/stumpings	2/–	0/–	0/–
- Source: CricketArchive, 4 September 2024

Gerald Aliseni (born 29 February 1988) is a Zimbabwe cricketer, who played for Mashonaland in first-class and List A cricket and the Southerners in Twenty20 cricket.
