= Ernest Masuku =

Zimbabwean cricketer (born 1992)

Personal information
- Born: 31 December 1992 (age 33); Harare, Zimbabwe
- Batting: Right-handed
- Bowling: Right-arm medium
- Role: Bowler

International information
- National side: Zimbabwe
- Only ODI (cap 163): 31 August 2025 v Sri Lanka

Domestic team information
- Years: Team
- 2017–present: Tuskers

Career statistics
| Competition | FC | LA | T20 |
|---|---|---|---|
| Matches | 48 | 53 | 29 |
| Runs scored | 771 | 342 | 154 |
| Batting average | 12.85 | 10.36 | 10.26 |
| 100s/50s | 0/4 | 0/1 | 0/0 |
| Top score | 67 | 67 | 17 |
| Balls bowled | 6,673 | 2,256 | 540 |
| Wickets | 160 | 89 | 30 |
| Bowling average | 27.56 | 23.48 | 26.53 |
| 5 wickets in innings | 6 | 5 | 0 |
| 10 wickets in match | 0 | 0 | 0 |
| Best bowling | 6/91 | 7/35 | 3/12 |
| Catches/stumpings | 23/– | 14/– | 4/– |
- Source: Cricinfo, 31 August 2025

Ernest Masuku (born 31 December 1992) is a Zimbabwean cricketer. He made his first-class debut for Matabeleland Tuskers in the 2016–17 Logan Cup on 17 May 2017. He made his List A debut for Matabeleland Tuskers in the 2016–17 Pro50 Championship on 25 May 2017.

He was the leading wicket-taker in the 2017–18 Logan Cup, with 32 dismissals in seven matches. In June 2018, he was named in a Zimbabwe Select team for warm-up fixtures ahead of the 2018 Zimbabwe Tri-Nation Series. He made his Twenty20 debut for Matabeleland Tuskers in the 2018–19 Stanbic Bank 20 Series on 11 March 2019. In December 2020, he was selected to play for the Tuskers in the 2020–21 Logan Cup. He was the leading wicket-taker in the 2021–22 Logan Cup, with 38 dismissals in eight matches.

In May 2022, Masuku was named in Zimbabwe's Twenty20 International (T20I) squad for their five-match home series against Namibia.
