= Tendai Chisoro =

Zimbabwean cricketer

Personal information
- Full name: Tendai Sam Chisoro
- Born: 12 February 1988 (age 38); Masvingo, Zimbabwe
- Batting: Left-handed
- Bowling: Left-arm orthodox
- Role: Bowler

International information
- National side: Zimbabwe (2015–present)
- Test debut (cap 103): 29 October 2017 v West Indies
- Last Test: 7 May 2021 v Pakistan
- ODI debut (cap 129): 16 October 2015 v Afghanistan
- Last ODI: 3 November 2020 v Pakistan
- T20I debut (cap 42): 26 October 2015 v Afghanistan
- Last T20I: 8 November 2020 v Pakistan

Domestic team information
- Years: Team
- Centrals
- Mid West Rhinos
- 2010: Southern Rocks

Career statistics
Competition	Test	ODI	T20I
Matches	3	21	14
Runs scored	27	146	43
Batting average	5.40	13.27	10.75
100s/50s	0/0	0/0	0/0
Top score	9	42*	14*
Balls bowled	693	900	318
Wickets	6	24	12
Bowling average	55.50	28.50	30.66
5 wickets in innings	0	0	0
10 wickets in match	0	0	0
Best bowling	3/113	3/16	3/17
Catches/stumpings	1/-	6/-	1/-
- Source: ESPNcricinfo, 10 May 2021

Tendai Chisoro (born 12 February 1988) is a Zimbabwean cricketer who represents the Zimbabwe national cricket team. He made his international debut for Zimbabwe against Afghanistan in October 2015.

== Domestic career ==
Chisoro was the leading wicket-taker in the 2017–18 Logan Cup for Mid West Rhinos, with 28 dismissals in five matches. He was also the leading wicket-taker for Mid West Rhinos in the 2017–18 Pro50 Championship tournament, with twelve dismissals in eight matches. In December 2020, he was selected to play for the Southern Rocks in the 2020–21 Logan Cup.

In 2022, Chisoro signed with St Patricks Cricket Club. He then quickly became one of the most celebrated names in regional cricket across Australia.

== International career ==
Chisoro made his One Day International (ODI) debut for Zimbabwe against Afghanistan on 16 October 2015. He made his Twenty20 International debut, also against Afghanistan, on 26 October 2015. Along with Sikandar Raza, they set the highest ninth-wicket partnership for Zimbabwe in ODIs, with 91 not out.

In October 2017, Chisoro was named in Zimbabwe's Test squad for their series against the West Indies. He made his Test debut for Zimbabwe against the West Indies on 29 October 2017.

In June 2018, Chisoro was named in a Zimbabwe Select team for warm-up fixtures ahead of the 2018 Zimbabwe Tri-Nation Series.
