= Mutare Sports Club =

Cricket ground

Coordinates: 18.9831°S 32.6726°E

Mutare Sports Club is a cricket ground in Mutare, Manicaland Province, Zimbabwe. It is located just to the south-east of the city centre, next to Main Park.

It has been the home ground of the Mountaineers, one of Zimbabwe's five first-class cricket franchises, since they were formed in 2009. Prior to the reorganisation of Zimbabwean cricket, it was the home ground of the Manicaland team. The ground was originally called the Umtali Sports Club, before the city of Umtali was renamed as Mutare in 1982.

The first List A cricket match at the ground took place in March 1984, when Zimbabwe played the touring Young India team. The first first-class match took place in March 2000 when Manicaland played Mashonaland in the Logan Cup. The ground and its facilities were upgraded in 2010.

Mutare Sports Club was the scene of a key incident in Indian cricket's Chappell–Ganguly controversy, when during a warm-up match at the ground on India's 2005 tour of Zimbabwe, India's coach Greg Chappell suggested that India would be better served if captain Sourav Ganguly stood down as captain to focus on getting his batting organised and that Ganguly would not have a place in the side if the best XI was picked.

Mutare Sports Club is also the home ground of the Mutare Sports Club rugby union team, who play in the Harare Provincial Rugby League.
