= Thabo Mboyi =

Zimbabwean cricketer (born 1985)

Personal information
- Born: 17 May 1985 (age 41); Bulawayo, Zimbabwe
- Source: ESPNcricinfo, 3 October 2016

Thabo Mboyi (born 17 May 1985) is a Zimbabwean first-class cricketer who plays for Matabeleland Tuskers. In December 2020, he was selected to play for the Tuskers in the 2020–21 Logan Cup.
