= Walter Musakwa =

Zimbabwean cricket umpire (born 1979)

Personal information
- Born: 13 September 1979 (age 47); Chitungwiza

Umpiring information
- Source: Cricinfo, 29 April 2018

Walter Musakwa (born 13 September 1979) is a Zimbabwean cricket umpire. He has stood in domestic matches in the 2017–18 Logan Cup and the 2017–18 Pro50 Championship tournaments.
