= Tinotenda Mutombodzi =

Zimbabwean cricketer

Personal information
- Full name: Tinotenda Confidence Mutombodzi
- Born: 21 December 1990 (age 35); Harare, Zimbabwe
- Nickname: Tyno
- Batting: Right-handed
- Bowling: Right-arm legbreak
- Role: All-rounder

International information
- National side: Zimbabwe
- Only Test (cap 112): 27 January 2020 v Sri Lanka
- ODI debut (cap 115): 26 February 2013 v West Indies
- Last ODI: 6 March 2020 v Bangladesh
- T20I debut (cap 34): 2 March 2013 v West Indies
- Last T20I: 11 March 2020 v Bangladesh

Domestic team information
- Years: Team
- 2008/09: Northerns
- 2009/10–2021/22: Mashonaland Eagles
- 2021/22: Southerns

Career statistics
Competition	ODI	T20I	FC	LA
Matches	11	3	50	69
Runs scored	112	15	1,710	812
Batting average	12.44	5.00	23.10	19.33
100s/50s	0/0	0/0	2/5	0/4
Top score	27	12	230	79
Balls bowled	311	60	6,469	2065
Wickets	6	2	101	48
Bowling average	46.33	40.50	35.22	33.60
5 wickets in innings	0	0	4	0
10 wickets in match	0	0	0	0
Best bowling	2/33	2/28	7/84	3/27
Catches/stumpings	4/–	0/–	49/–	34/–
- Source: Cricinfo, 11 March 2020

Tinotenda Confidence Mutombodzi (born 21 December 1990) is a Zimbabwean cricketer. He began his career as a leg-spin bowler, but now plays principally as a batsman. He made his One Day International debut against the West Indies in February 2013, and his T20 International debut against the same team in March 2013.

== Early and domestic career ==
Mutombodzi was born in Harare. At the age of nine, he took up cricket and represented Zimbabwe's Under-13 and Under-16 teams. He was part of the Zimbabwe's Under-19 team in the 2008 Under-19 World Cup and also Zimbabwe's Under-19 Side that toured New Zealand in 2010. His performances in the Under-19 team included scoring 43 against Pakistan Under-19 team in an unofficial ODI and also picking up 4/27 against the same team in the same series.

He was the highest scorer in Zimbabwe's 2014–15 season, scoring 630 runs for Mashonaland Eagles at an average of 39.37. He also made the only double-century of the season when he scored 230 against Mountaineers. He and Mark Pettini added 352 for the third wicket, breaking the Zimbabwe domestic all-wicket record.

He was the leading wicket-taker in the 2017–18 Logan Cup for Mashonaland Eagles, with 21 dismissals in seven matches. In September 2018, he was named in Zimbabwe's squad for the 2018 Africa T20 Cup tournament.

In December 2020, he was selected to play for the Eagles in the 2020–21 Logan Cup.

== International career ==
Mutombodzi was named in the 24-man squad for the West Indian tour. He replaced Prosper Utseya in the third ODI. He scored 13 runs until he was run out by Dwayne Bravo. He was the best bowler in the Match for Zimbabwe, picking up 2/35 in his ten overs with a good economy rate of 3.50 runs per over. He made his T20 debut on March 2, 2013. It was not as good as his ODI debut, as he just made 2 runs and went for 0–20 in his two overs. In the next T20, he took his first T20 wickets, with figures of 2-28 from his four overs.

Mutombodzi was named in a 21-man squad against Bangladesh at home. He played the first T20I, scoring 12 not out from 9 balls and had figures of 0–33 in 4 overs. He also was involved in two run outs during the match, which Zimbabwe won by 6 runs.

In January 2020, Mutombodzi was added to Zimbabwe's Test squad for the second Test against Sri Lanka. He made his Test debut for Zimbabwe, against Sri Lanka, on 27 January 2020.
