= Kwekwe Sports Club =

Cricket ground in Kwekwe, Zimbabwe

- Interactive map of Kwekwe Sports Club

Ground information
- Location: Kwekwe, Zimbabwe
- Country: Zimbabwe
- Coordinates: 18°56′26″S 29°49′16″E
- Establishment: 1951
- Capacity: 1400
- Tenants: Zimbabwe national cricket team Midlands cricket team
- End names
- n/a n/a

International information
- Only men's ODI: 11 December 2002: Zimbabwe v Kenya
- As of 1 January 2016; Source: Cricinfo

The Kwekwe Sports Club in Kwekwe is the home ground of one of Zimbabwe's four provincial cricket sides, the Mid West Rhinos. The cricket ground has been host to several first class and one day matches and has even hosted some internationals – most notably between Zimbabwe and Kenya in 2002. Kwekwe also hosts a variety of touring sides versus Zimbabwe A teams.

In 2018 Kwekwe Sports Club formed a theatre section named KKSC Theatre. The theatre has performed three original plays since their inception with its next due in June 2020.
