= Owen Chirombe =

Zimbabwean cricket umpire (born 1973)

Personal information
- Full name: Owen Chirombe
- Born: 30 March 1973 (age 53); Salisbury, Republic of Rhodesia
- Role: Umpire

Umpiring information
- ODIs umpired: 16 (2010–2014)
- T20Is umpired: 8 (2010–2013)
- FC umpired: 37 (2005–2010)
- LA umpired: 32 (2006–2010)
- Source: Cricinfo, 24 November 2010

Owen Chirombe (born 30 March 1973), is a Zimbabwean cricket umpire. He first umpired at the first-class level in 2005, and in an international match in 2010, in a One Day International between Zimbabwe and Ireland. He was one of the three match referees for the 2023 ICC Under-19 Women's T20 World Cup.

== See also ==
- List of One Day International cricket umpires
- List of Twenty20 International cricket umpires
