= Iknow Chabi =

Zimbabwean cricket umpire (born 1984)

Personal information
- Born: 18 June 1984 (age 42); Harare, Zimbabwe
- Role: Umpire

Umpiring information
- Tests umpired: 1 (2023)
- ODIs umpired: 20 (2019–2025)
- T20Is umpired: 57 (2018–2025)
- WODIs umpired: 7 (2021–2024)
- WT20Is umpired: 12 (2021–2024)
- Source: Cricinfo, 24 June 2023

Iknow Chabi (born 18 June 1984) is a Zimbabwean cricket umpire. He has officiated in the 2016–17 Logan Cup and the 2016–17 Pro50 Championship tournaments.

On 4 July 2018, Chabi stood in his first Twenty20 International (T20I) match, between Zimbabwe and Pakistan, during the 2018 Zimbabwe Tri-Nation Series. On 12 April 2019, he made his One Day International (ODI) umpiring debut, in a match between Zimbabwe and the United Arab Emirates. As of June 2023, he had stood as an umpire in 50 women's and men's ODIs and T20Is. He has also officiated in one Test match, in 2023. He was one of the sixteen umpires for the 2020 Under-19 Cricket World Cup tournament in South Africa.

== See also ==
- List of One Day International cricket umpires
- List of Twenty20 International cricket umpires
