= Kevin Kasuza =

Zimbabwean cricketer

Personal information
- Full name: Kevin Tatenda Kasuza
- Born: 20 June 1993 (age 33); Mutare, Zimbabwe
- Batting: Right-handed
- Bowling: Right-arm off break
- Role: Batsman

International information
- National side: Zimbabwe
- Test debut (cap 108): 19 January 2020 v Sri Lanka
- Last Test: 7 May 2021 v Pakistan

Domestic team information
- Years: Team
- 2009–present: Mountaineers

Career statistics
Competition	Test	FC	LA	T20
Matches	6	65	67	33
Runs scored	223	3,167	1,607	615
Batting average	24.77	31.04	25.91	20.5
100s/50s	0/1	2/21	3/6	0/1
Top score	63	132*	129*	55
Balls bowled	–	6	21	6
Wickets	–	0	1	0
Bowling average	–	–	16	–
5 wickets in innings	–	–	0	–
10 wickets in match	–	–	0	–
Best bowling	–	–	1/15	–
Catches/stumpings	2/–	42/–	22/–	9/–
- Source: ESPNCricinfo, 7 May 2021

Kevin Tatenda Kasuza (born 20 June 1993) is a Zimbabwean cricketer. He is primarily a batsman and represented Zimbabwe at Under-19 level.

== Early life ==
Kevin is the first from his family to play cricket, and he first encountered the game at Chirowakamwe Primary School in Mutare, where the coach was Foster Mupita. Mupita, first impressed upon Kevin the need to work really hard to succeed in cricket. He progressed to Mutare Boys High School, Farai Chari being the coach here. Both men played a vital part in developing Kevin's skills. He progressed very quickly, and at Under-13 level was already representing the Manicaland age-group team. He continued to represent them from Under-13 to Under-19 level – and he still qualifies for their Under-19 team. He scored centuries for their Under-14 and Under-19 teams.

Kevin started playing club cricket in Mutare when he was in Form Two, playing his first club match at Mutare Sports Club, but for Titans against the home side. In his early years with school and club he used to keep wicket as well, but over the years he probably wisely decided to concentrate on batting.

== U-19 and domestic career ==
Kevin Kasuza first came to note when he struck successive half-centuries for the Zimbabwe Under-19 cricket team against the South Africa Under-19 cricket team. His 54 in the first game under pressure went in vain as SA U-19 won by seven wickets. His second fifty, again a 68 under pressure was the only noteworthy innings as Zim U-19 collapsed to lose the match by 39 runs.

So far, in U-19 cricket, he has scored 123 runs from 5 matches with two half-centuries, and he played all his matches against the SA U-19. Along with a batting average of 24.60, he has taken 3 catches and 1 stumping as a wicketkeeper.

On his first-class cricket debut for Mountaineers on 7 February 2011, Kasuza missed a hundred by only 8 runs and scored a fine 92 on debut. He and Tendai Chatara's five-for gave Mountaineers a point over Matabeleland Tuskers.

The first of his twin tons within two weeks that brought him into the limelight was a 132* in a Logan Cup match for Mountaineers. Against Mid-West Rhinos, in Kwekwe, the opposition scored 309, with a century for Gary Ballance – and Kevin admitted to dropping him before he had scored. In reply, Mountaineers had six wickets down for 77, although Kevin, who had gone in at number three, was still there. Shingi Masakadza stayed with him for a while, but otherwise his only real support came from the last man, Tapiwa Mufudza, with whom he added 92. Kevin finished with 132 not out, out of 224. A poor batting performance in the second innings allowed Mountaineers to come through on the final day and win by three wickets. Although Kevin made only 27 this time, it is quite clear that without his first-innings century Mountaineers would have lost the match. That Kevin considered the finest performance of his career. He feels that having dropped Gary Ballance put him under pressure, but it spurred him on to put the matter right and score a century himself.

The second ton came within two-week of each other, this time in a Pro40 match against the Southern Rocks. This time the score was 129*. He scored 129 out of a total of 229, which was enough to win the match for his team. Again, had Kevin gone cheaply, it is highly unlikely Mountaineers could have won that match. He had done it again for his team, showing not only tremendous talent but also a magnificent temperament in a crisis. Kasuza said that his sudden burst in batting form was due to his vying for fitness more than before, and that his coach Gary Brent had always told him that if he had to get to hundreds, then he would have to stay fit.

In December 2011, he further made a case for his consideration for selection with another fine century for Mountaineers in the Coca-Cola Pro50 Championship. His 110* was the main architect behind a total of 199. The ton was scored off only 91 balls and just stunned the opposing Matabeleland Tuskers' bowlers. Even there batsmen couldn't come back from the assault, and that culminated in a Tuskers defeat.

In December 2020, he was named as the captain of the Mountaineers for the 2020–21 Logan Cup.

== International career ==
In January 2020, he was named in Zimbabwe's Test squad for their series against Sri Lanka. He made his Test debut for Zimbabwe against Sri Lanka, on 19 January 2020 in Harare.

On 25 January 2024, Kasuza was suspended indefinitely by Zimbabwe Cricket after testing positive for a banned recreational drug during an in-house doping test.
