= Jeremiah Matibiri =

Zimbabwean cricket umpire (born 1971)

Personal information
- Full name: Tichaona Jeremiah Matibiri
- Born: 31 May 1971 (age 55); Salisbury, Rhodesia
- Role: Umpire

Umpiring information
- ODIs umpired: 23 (2013–2018)
- T20Is umpired: 15 (2011–2018)
- Source: ESPNcricinfo, 18 July 2018

Jeremiah Matibiri (born 31 May 1971) is a Zimbabwean cricket umpire. He first umpired in first-class cricket in 2005, and debuted in international cricket in 2011, when he stood in a Twenty20 International (T20I) between Zimbabwe and Pakistan. He has officiated in 23 One Day International and 15 T20I matches.

== See also ==
- List of One Day International cricket umpires
- List of Twenty20 International cricket umpires
