= Russell Tiffin =

Cricket umpire

Personal information
- Full name: Russell Blair Tiffin
- Born: 4 June 1959 (age 67); Salisbury, Southern Rhodesia
- Height: 6 ft 2 in (1.88 m)
- Batting: Right-handed
- Role: Umpire

Domestic team information
- Years: Team
- Old Hararians

Umpiring information
- Tests umpired: 44 (1995–2009)
- ODIs umpired: 156 (1992–2018)
- T20Is umpired: 21 (2010–2018)
- Source: ESPNcricinfo, 22 July 2018

Russell Blair Tiffin (born 4 June 1959) is a Zimbabwean cricket umpire and former cricketer. He was a member of the ICC International umpire panel from 1995 to 2018 when he retired.

== Early life ==
Tiffin was born in Salisbury, Southern Rhodesia (now Harare, Zimbabwe). His family were farmers in the Tengwe area in the north of the country. Tiffin was educated at Banket Primary School and Prince Edward High School in Harare, where he became a wicketkeeper-batsman. After three years of military service, he played for Mashonaland in the days before Zimbabwean provincial cricket had first-class status, while working as a manager for Castrol Zimbabwe. He became an umpire in 1986, but continued with his day job until May 2002, when he became a full-time umpire.

== Umpiring career ==
He became a member of the ICC Elite Panel in April 2001. In February 2004, he was among three umpires, along with Asoka de Silva and Dave Orchard, whose contracts were not renewed. He officiated in 44 Test matches, the most for any Zimbabwean umpire. In December 2007 he stood in his 39th Test match, after a 3-year lay-off from umpiring Tests. In November 2016 he stood in his 150th One Day International (ODI) game, in the match between Zimbabwe and the West Indies at the Queens Sports Club in Bulawayo.

== See also ==
- List of One Day International cricket umpires
- List of Test cricket umpires
- List of Twenty20 International cricket umpires
