= Brian Chari =

Zimbabwean cricketer (born 1992)

Personal information
- Full name: Brian Bara Chari
- Born: 14 February 1992 (age 34); Chegutu, Zimbabwe
- Batting: Right-handed
- Bowling: Right-arm off break
- Role: Top-order batsman

International information
- National side: Zimbabwe
- Test debut (cap 94): 3 November 2014 v Bangladesh
- Last Test: 11 November 2018 v Bangladesh
- ODI debut (cap 126): 1 October 2015 v Pakistan
- Last ODI: 3 November 2019 v Pakistan
- T20I debut (cap 54): 27 September 2019 v Nepal
- Last T20I: 1 October 2019 v Nepal

Domestic team information
- Years: Team
- 2011–: Matabeleland Tuskers

Career statistics
Competition	Test	ODI	FC	LA
Matches	7	14	67	89
Runs scored	254	186	3,095	2,343
Batting average	18.14	13.28	25.79	29.28
100s/50s	0/2	0/0	4/18	6/11
Top score	80	39	128	125
Balls bowled	18	–	455	162
Wickets	0	–	6	1
Bowling average	–	–	44.33	126.00
5 wickets in innings	–	–	0	0
10 wickets in match	–	–	0	0
Best bowling	–	–	3/25	1/35
Catches/stumpings	8/–	3/1	46/–	21/1
- Source: Cricinfo, 3 November 2020

Brian Bara Chari (born 14 February 1992) is a Zimbabwean cricketer. He made his international debut for the Zimbabwe national cricket team in November 2014.

== Domestic career ==
A top-order batsman and occasional off break bowler, Chari has played domestically for the Matabeleland Tuskers since 2011. He was the leading run-scorer for Matabeleland Tuskers in the 2017–18 Pro50 Championship tournament, with 316 runs in eight matches. He was also the leading run-scorer for the Matabeleland Tuskers in the 2018–19 Logan Cup, with 356 runs in six matches.

In December 2020, he was named as the captain of the Tuskers for the 2020–21 Logan Cup.

== International career ==
Chari made his Test debut for Zimbabwe in November 2014, playing in two of the team's three Tests on their tour of Bangladesh. He made his One Day International (ODI) debut for Zimbabwe against Pakistan on 1 October 2015.

In June 2018, he was named in a 22-man preliminary Twenty20 International (T20I) squad for the 2018 Zimbabwe Tri-Nation Series. The following month, he was named in Zimbabwe's One Day International (ODI) squad for their series against Pakistan.

In September 2018, he was named in Zimbabwe's squad for the 2018 Africa T20 Cup tournament. In September 2019, he was named in Zimbabwe's Twenty20 International (T20I) squad for the 2019–20 Singapore Tri-Nation Series. He made his T20I debut for Zimbabwe, against Nepal, in the Singapore Tri-Nation Series on 27 September 2019.
