= Langton Rusere =

Cricket umpire

Personal information
- Full name: Langton Rusere
- Born: 7 July 1985 (age 41); Masvingo, Zimbabwe
- Role: Umpire

Umpiring information
- Tests umpired: 8 (2021–2024)
- ODIs umpired: 43 (2015–2025)
- T20Is umpired: 85 (2015–2026)
- WODIs umpired: 9 (2017–2022)
- WT20Is umpired: 9 (2018–2020)
- Source: Cricinfo, 24 June 2023

Langton Rusere (born 7 July 1985) is a Zimbabwean cricket umpire. He stood in his first Twenty20 International match, between Zimbabwe and India, on 19 July 2015. He officiated in his first One Day International match when Zimbabwe played Afghanistan on 24 October 2015.

== Career ==
He was one of the seventeen on-field umpires for the 2018 Under-19 Cricket World Cup. On 17 March 2018 at the 2018 Cricket World Cup Qualifier, along with Sharfuddoula, he was one of the on-field umpires during the ninth-place playoff match between Papua New Guinea and Hong Kong. The fixture at Old Hararians in Harare became the 4,000th ODI match to be played.

He was one of the twelve on-field umpires for the 2018 ICC Women's World Twenty20. Along with Shaun George, he was appointed as one of the on-field umpires for the tournament's final. He was the first Zimbabwean umpire to stand in the final of a major international cricket tournament. In February 2020, the ICC named him as one of the umpires for the 2020 ICC Women's T20 World Cup in Australia.

In April 2021, in the Test series between Zimbabwe and Pakistan, Rusere became the first black African umpire to stand in a Test match.

He was one of the 16 umpires to officiate at the 2021 ICC Men's T20 World Cup in Oman and UAE. In February 2022, he was named as one of the on-field umpires for the 2022 Women's Cricket World Cup in New Zealand.

In October 2022, ICC included him in the 20 match officials officiating 2022 ICC Men's T20 World Cup in Australia.

== See also ==
- List of Test cricket umpires
- List of One Day International cricket umpires
- List of Twenty20 International cricket umpires
