= Christopher Phiri =

Zimbabwean cricketer and umpire (born 1975)

Personal information
- Born: 26 May 1975 (age 51); Bulawayo, Zimbabwe
- Role: Umpire

Umpiring information
- ODIs umpired: 6 (2022–2023)
- T20Is umpired: 22 (2021–2023)
- WODIs umpired: 7 (2021–2025)
- WT20Is umpired: 3 (2021–2025)
- Source: Cricinfo, 5 April 2023

Christopher Phiri (born 26 May 1975) is a Zimbabwean cricket umpire and former List A cricketer. As an umpire, he stood in a tour match between Zimbabwe Chairman's XI and the visiting Afghanistan national team in October 2015. On 22 July 2021, Phiri stood in his first Twenty20 International (T20I) match, between Zimbabwe and Bangladesh. On 10 August 2022, he stood in his first One Day International (ODI) match, also between Zimbabwe and Bangladesh. He has umpired in 7 ODIs, including one women's ODI, and 23 T20Is, which also include 2 women's T20Is.

== See also ==
- List of One Day International cricket umpires
- List of Twenty20 International cricket umpires
