= 2024–25 Logan Cup =

Cricket tournament

- Dates: 27 October 2024 – 8 March 2025
- Administrator: Zimbabwe Cricket
- Cricket format: First-class cricket (4 days)
- Tournament format: Double round-robin
- Champions: Mountaineers (6th title)
- Participants: 5
- Matches: 20
- Most runs: Nick Welch (Mountaineers) (823)
- Most wickets: Vincent Masekesa (Mountaineers) (43)

The 2024–25 Logan Cup was the 31st edition of the Logan Cup, a first-class cricket competition in Zimbabwe, which started on 27 October 2024 and concluded on 8 March 2025. The Mountaineers were the defending champions. They retained their title by defeating Eagles in the final round.

== Points table ==
Team	Pld	W	L	D	NR	Pts
Mountaineers	8	3	1	4	0	139
Rhinos	8	3	1	4	0	130
Eagles	8	2	3	3	0	109
Rocks	8	1	1	6	0	105
Tuskers	8	1	4	3	0	82

Champions.

- 10 points for a win, 6 for a tie, 5 for a draw, 0 for a loss. An extra 2 points are awarded for an innings victory.
- Batting bonus points: 1 point each for reaching 200, 250, 300, and 350 runs in each innings.
- Bowling bonus points: 1 point each for taking 3, 5, 7, and 9 wickets in each innings

=== Match summary ===
The total team points at the end of each round are listed.

Team	Round										Total
Team	1	2	3	4	5	6	7	8	9	10	Total
Mountaineers	0	23	42	57	80	80	95	108	116	139	139
Rhinos	21	31	55	74	74	79	94	110	130	130	130
Eagles	15	39	43	43	52	67	89	101	101	109	109
Rocks	18	18	32	48	55	65	65	77	83	105	105
Tuskers	7	14	14	28	37	42	49	49	61	82	82

Win	Loss	Draw	Bye	Abandoned

== Fixtures ==
=== Round 1 ===
27–30 October 2024
Scorecard

Rocks	v	Eagles
384 (94.3 overs); Saif Zaib 78 (98); Munashe Chipara 3/55 (16.3 overs)		318 (70.2 overs); Tinashe Kamunhukamwe 124 (113); Privilege Chesa 4/76 (17 overs)
353/6d (87 overs); Johnathan Campbell 79 (110); Travor Mutsamba 2/64 (15 overs)		214/4 (64 overs); Craig Ervine 103 (172); Roy Kaia 1/18 (13 overs)

Match drawn
Takashinga Cricket Club, Harare
Umpires: David Shawane and Forster Mutizwa
Player of the match: Roy Kaia (Rocks)

- Southern Rocks elected to bat
- Matthew Campbell (Rocks) made his first-class debut.
- Points: Rocks 18, Eagles 15

27–30 October 2024
Scorecard

Tuskers	v	Rhinos
203 (45.2 overs); Tanunurwa Makoni 82 (110); Michael Chinouya 3/32 (8 overs)		301 (69.3 overs); Ben Curran 145 (190); Ernest Masuku 4/73 (13.3 overs)
245 (67 overs); Sean Williams 67 (61); Michael Chinouya 5/49 (13 overs)		149/5 (30.1 overs); Antum Naqvi 70 (61); Luke Jongwe 1/23 (4 overs)

Rhinos won by 5 wickets
Kwekwe Sports Club, Kwekwe
Umpires: Iknow Chabi and Stanley Gogwe
Player of the match: Ben Curran (Rhinos)

- Mid West Rhinos elected to field
- Ahsan Aqil and Hendrichs Macheke (Rhinos) both made their first-class debuts.
- Points: Rhinos 21, Tuskers 8

=== Round 2 ===
7–10 November 2024
Scorecard

Tuskers	v	Eagles
321 (92.1 overs); Sean Williams 88 (96); Alex Russell 5/77 (22.1 overs)		716/7d (149.4 overs); Dion Myers 179 (198); Arnold Shara 2/95 (20 overs)
190 (34.3 overs); Hamid Ali 76 (59); Alex Russell 5/63 (12 overs)

Eagles won by an innings and 205 runs
Queens Sports Club, Bulawayo
Umpires: Percival Sizara and Collin Tlou
Player of the match: Alex Russell (Eagles)

- Eagles won the toss and elected to field.
- Eagles broke the record for the highest total ever amassed by any Zimbabwean team in first-class cricket.
- Points: Eagles 24, Tuskers 6

7–10 November 2024
Scorecard

Mountaineers	v	Rhinos
393 (112.2 overs); Nick Welch 125 (151); Ben Curran 2/7 (4.2 overs)		293 (81 overs); Brad Evans 71 (82); Vincent Masekesa 7/117 (29 overs)
225 (51.4 overs); Mathew Welch 89 (81); Brandon Mavuta 5/115 (23 overs)		182 (47.4 overs); Nyasha Mayavo 46 (59); Vincent Masekesa 5/63 (14.4 overs)

Mountaineers won by 143 runs
Kwekwe Sports Club, Kwekwe
Umpires: Stanley Gogwe and Christopher Phiri
Player of the match: Vincent Masekesa (Mountaineers)

- Mountaineers won the toss and elected to bat.
- Arinesto Vezha (Mountaineers) made his first-class debut.
- Points: Mountaineers 23, Rhinos 10

=== Round 3 ===
25–28 November 2024
Scorecard

Eagles	v	Rhinos
183 (45.4 overs); Prosper Mugeri 37 (30); Antum Naqvi 4/58 (17 overs)		498/8d (132.2 overs); Ahsan Ali Aqil 111 (230); Alex Russell 3/125 (39 overs)
225 (70.1 overs); Wessly Madhevere 113 (192); Antum Naqvi 5/52 (70.1 overs)

Rhinos won by an innings and 90 runs
Harare Sports Club, Harare
Umpires: Tafadzwa Musakwa and Christopher Phiri
Player of the match: Antum Naqvi (Rhinos)

- Eagles won the toss and elected to bat.
- Prosper Mugeri (Eagles) made his first-class debut.
- Ahsan Ali Aqil (Rhinos) scored his maiden century in first-class cricket.
- Antum Naqvi (Rhinos) took his maiden five-wicket haul in first-class cricket.
- Points: Rhinos 24, Eagles 4

25–28 November 2024
Scorecard

Mountaineers	v	Rocks
402 (110.4 overs); Nick Welch 151 (223); Cuthbert Musoko 2/46 (18 overs)		296 (90.3 overs); Richmond Mutumbami 84 (167); Victor Nyauchi 5/62 (18.3 overs)
256/5d (37.5 overs); Alistair Frost 99 (94); William Mashinge 3/68 (10.5 overs)		223/9 (58.1 overs); Roy Kaia 55 (84); Vincent Masekesa 4/91 (20 overs)

Match drawn
Mutare Sports Club, Mutare
Umpires: Sifelani Rwaziyeni and Percival Sizara
Player of the match: Nick Welch (Mountaineers)

- Mountaineers won the toss and elected to bat.
- Tinaye Muzonde (Rocks) made his first-class debut.
- Points: Mountaineers 19, Rocks 14

=== Round 4 ===
7–10 December 2024
Scorecard

Mountaineers	v	Tuskers
253/9d (81 overs); Timycen Maruma 64 (115); Luke Jongwe 3/49 (15 overs)		423 (135.3 overs); Hamid Ali 160 (267); Vincent Masekesa 4/127 (41 overs)
351/4 (126 overs); Nick Welch 159 (295); Brian Mudzinganyama 2/26 (8 overs)

Match drawn
Mutare Sports Club, Mutare
Umpires: Sifelani Rwaziyeni and David Shawane
Player of the match: Nick Welch (Mountaineers)

- Mountaineers won the toss and elected to bat.
- Points: Mountaineers 15, Tuskers 14

7–10 December 2024
Scorecard

Rhinos	v	Rocks
395 (95.2 overs); Ben Curran 109 (168); Roy Kaia 3/57 (13.2 overs)		376 (97.1 overs); Innocent Kaia 130 (249); Brandon Mavuta 6/121 (28.1 overs)
374/8d (99.3 overs); Antum Naqvi 98 (168); Takudzwa Chataira 4/68 (20 overs)		160/6 (62 overs); Innocent Kaia 58 (122); Michael Chinouya 3/43 (6 overs)

Match drawn
Takashinga Cricket Club, Harare
Umpires: Tafadzwa Musakwa and Christopher Phiri
Player of the match: Brandon Mavuta (Rhinos)

- Rhinos won the toss and elected to bat.
- Panashe Taruvinga (Rocks) made his first-class debut.
- Points: Rhinos 19, Rocks 16

=== Round 5 ===
6–9 January 2025
Scorecard

Mountaineers	v	Eagles
217 (32.5 overs); Definate Mawadzi 56 (66); Alex Russell 5/77 (15 overs)		69 (32.5 overs); Tinashe Kamunhukamwe 19 (27); Arinesto Vezha 3/4 (6 overs)
372 (93.3 overs); Definate Mawadzi 171 (228); Alex Russell 6/141 (28.3 overs)		211/9 (67 overs); Emmanuel Bawa 75 (107); Tendai Chatara 5/40 (17 overs)

Mountaineers won by 309 runs
Harare Sports Club, Harare
Umpires: Christopher Phiri and David Shawane
Player of the match: Definate Mawadzi (Mountaineers)

- Eagles won the toss and elected to field.
- Emmanuel Bawa and Ryan Kamwemba (Eagles) both made their first-class debuts.
- Definate Mawadzi (Mountaineers) scored his maiden century in first-class cricket.
- Points: Mountaineers 23, Eagles 9

6–9 January 2025
Scorecard

Rocks	v	Tuskers
557/5 (136 overs); Tanunurwa Makoni 185* (281); Keith Jaure 2/78 (23 overs)

Match drawn
Takashinga Cricket Club, Harare
Umpires: Tafadzwa Musakwa and Sifelani Rwaziyeni
Player of the match: Tanunurwa Makoni (Tuskers)

- Tuskers won the toss and elected to bat.
- Only 45 overs were played on day 1 due to a rain and wet outfield.
- No play was possible on day 3 and 4 due to rain and wet outfield.
- Points: Tuskers 9, Rocks 7

=== Round 6 ===
17–20 January 2025
Scorecard

Rocks	v	Eagles
325 (100 overs); Matthew Campbell 122 (214); Alex Russell 5/90 (30 overs)		422/6d (105 overs); Craig Ervine 132 (206); Ryan Higgins 3/87 (29 overs)
32/6 (15 overs); Johnathan Campbell 13 (13); Alex Falao 4/17 (5 overs)

Match drawn
Harare Sports Club, Harare
Umpires: Sifelani Rwaziyeni and Percival Sizara
Player of the match: Alex Russell (Eagles)

- Eagles won the toss an elected to field.
- No play was possible on day 1 due to rain and wet outfield.
- Points: Eagles 15, Rocks 10

17–20 January 2025
Scorecard

Tuskers	v	Rhinos
17/0 (9.3 overs); Tanunurwa Makoni 11* (28)

Match drawn
Bulawayo Athletic Club, Bulawayo
Umpires: Iknow Chabi and Christopher Phiri

- Rhinos won the toss and elected to field.
- No play was possible on day 1, day 2 and day 4 due to rain and wet outfield.
- Only 9.3 overs of play was possible on day 3 due to rain and wet outfield.
- Points: Tuskers 5, Rhinos 5

=== Round 7 ===
28–31 January 2025
Scorecard

Tuskers	v	Eagles
166 (46.1 overs); Luke Jongwe 72 (93); Alex Falao 5/40 (13.1 overs)		512/8d (107.3 overs); Wessly Madhevere 150 (223); Luke Jongwe 2/82 (18 overs)
461 (125.3 overs); Will Fraine 149 (209); Alex Falao 7/95 (25 overs)		121/2 (24.4 overs); Dion Myers 50* (57); Tanatswa Bechani 1/74 (12 overs)

Eagles won by 8 wickets
Takashinga Cricket Club, Harare
Umpires: Iknow Chabi and Stanley Gogwe
Player of the match: Alex Falao (Eagles)

- Eagles won the toss and elected to field.
- Alex Falao (Eagles) took his maiden five-wicket haul in first-class cricket.
- Points: Eagles 22, Tuskers 7

28–31 January 2025
Scorecard

Mountaineers	v	Rhinos
402/7d (97.2 overs); Alistair Frost 209* (283); Brandon Mavuta 3/104 (20.2 overs)		321 (86 overs); Ben Curran 116 (190); Vincent Masekesa 6/143 (32 overs)
247 (50.4 overs); Wellington Masakadza 55* (72); Brandon Mavuta 7/127 (21 overs)		165/4 (42 overs); Antum Naqvi 61 (83); Victor Nyauchi 1/20 (5 overs)

Match drawn
Mutare Sports Club, Mutare
Umpires: Tafadzwa Musakwa and Langton Rusere
Player of the match: Brandon Mavuta (Rhinos)

- Rhinos won the toss and elected to field.
- No play was possible on day 1 due to rain.
- Points: Mountaineers 15, Rhinos 15

=== Round 8 ===
9–12 February 2025
Scorecard

Eagles	v	Rhinos
157 (57 overs); Kundai Matigimu 35 (68); Brad Evans 4/34 (18 overs)		371 (81.1 overs); Antum Naqvi 125 (113); Faraz Akram 3/29 (12 overs)
323/8 (95.3 overs); Dion Myers 78 (159); Ryan Burl 2/54 (16 overs)

Match drawn
Kwekwe Sports Club, Kwekwe
Umpires: Stanley Gogwe and Christopher Phiri
Player of the match: Ryan Burl (Rhinos)

- Rhinos won the toss and elected to field.
- Kundai Matigimu (Eagles) made his first-class debut.
- Points: Eagles 12, Rhinos 16

9–12 February 2025
Scorecard

Rocks	v	Mountaineers
282 (93.4 overs); Matthew Campbell 78 (166); Definate Mawadzi 4/31 (9.4 overs)		303 (82.2 overs); Clive Chitumba 82 (151); Priviledge Chesa 5/111 (20.2 overs)
220/3d (52 overs); Innocent Kaia 96 (143); Definate Mawadzi 1/36 (7 overs)		106/2 (21 overs); Ashley Mufandauya 62 (69); Takudzwa Chataira 1/21 (5 overs)

Match drawn
Takashinga Cricket Club, Harare
Umpires: David Shawane and Percival Sizara
Player of the match: Definate Mawadzi (Mountaineers)

- Mountaineers won the toss and elected to field.
- Points: Rocks 12, Mountaineers 13

=== Round 9 ===
21–24 February 2025
Scorecard

Mountaineers	v	Tuskers
308 (96.1 overs); Nick Welch 90 (137); Hamid Ali 3/38 (7 overs)		422 (116.3 overs); Taffy Mupariwa 102 (214); Victor Nyauchi 3/72 (23 overs)
241 (69.3 overs); Clive Chitumba 53 (69); Ernest Masuku 4/77 (20 overs)		128/2 (26.2 overs); Tanunurwa Makoni 45* (70); Vincent Masekesa 2/40 (8 overs)

Tuskers won by 8 wickets
Queens Sports Club, Bulawayo
Umpires: Christopher Phiri and Stanley Gogwe
Player of the match: Ernest Masuku (Tuskers)

- Tuskers won the toss and elected to field.
- Points: Tuskers 22, Mountaineers 8

21–24 February 2025
Scorecard

Rocks	v	Rhinos
276 (71 overs); Matthew Campbell 84 (120); Antum Naqvi 5/91 (25 overs)		247 (73.2 overs); Antum Naqvi 71 (91); Priviledge Chesa 4/46 (15.2 overs)
173 (53.2 overs); Ryan Higgins 59 (115); Brandon Mavuta 4/59 (16.2 overs)		205/2 (53.2 overs); Ben Curran 98* (145); Dylan Hondo 1/31 (6 overs)

Rhinos won by 8 wickets
Kwekwe Sports Club, Kwekwe
Umpires: David Shawane and Tafadzwa Musakwa
Player of the match: Antum Naqvi (Rhinos)

- Rocks won the toss and elected to bat.
- Points: Rhinos 20, Rocks 6

=== Round 10 ===
5–8 March 2025
Scorecard

Mountaineers	v	Eagles
203 (51 overs); Nick Welch 73 (94); Alex Russell 5/84 (15 overs)		114 (43.3 overs); Kudzai Maunze 41 (91); Tendai Chatara 4/35 (13 overs)
411/9d (96 overs); Nick Welch 82 (128); Alex Falao 5/57 (12 overs)		142 (46.1 overs); Kudzai Maunze 51 (116); Vincent Masekesa 5/70 (14 overs)

Mountaineers won by 358 runs
Mutare Sports Club, Mutare
Umpires: Forster Mutizwa and Oscar Tafirenyika
Player of the match: Vincent Masekesa (Mountaineers)

- Eagles won the toss and elected to field.
- Points: Mountaineers 23, Eagles 8

5–8 March 2025
Scorecard

Rocks	v	Tuskers
204 (83.2 overs); Alvin Chiradza 67 (137); Nkosana Mpofu 3/12 (5 overs)		266 (74.2 overs); Taffy Mupariwa 88 (180); Roy Kaia 5/52 (23 overs)
312 (109.5 overs); Newman Nyamhuri 92* (163); Ainsley Ndlovu 4/73 (32.5 overs)		224 (66 overs); Tanunurwa Makoni 58 (133); Roy Kaia 6/54 (19 overs)

Rocks won by 26 runs
Queens Sports Club, Bulawayo
Umpires: Langton Rusere and Collin Tlou
Player of the match: Roy Kaia (Rocks)

- Rocks won the toss and elected to bat.
- Points: Rocks 22, Tuskers 11

== Statistics ==
=== Most runs ===
Player	Team	Mat	Inns	Runs	Ave	SR	HS	100	50	4s	6s
Nick Welch	Mountaineers	7	14	823	58.78	68.07	159	3	3	78	27
Ben Curran	Mid West Rhinos	7	11	753	75.30	72.12	145	3	3	104	1
Antum Naqvi	Mid West Rhinos	8	11	658	59.81	70.44	125	1	6	66	13
Tanunurwa Makoni	Matabeleland Tuskers	8	15	650	65.00	56.66	185*	2	3	87	1
Timycen Maruma	Mountaineers	8	15	601	42.92	54.63	76	0	5	62	12
Source: ESPNCricInfo

=== Most wickets ===
Player	Team	Mat	Inns	Wkts	BBI	Avg	Econ	SR	5w	10w
Vincent Masekesa	Mountaineers	7	13	43	7/117	22.02	3.94	33.51	4	1
Brandon Mavuta	Mid West Rhinos	7	12	41	7/127	24.65	4.29	34.43	3	1
Alex Russell	Mashonaland Eagles	8	14	41	6/141	29.29	4.27	41.07	6	2
Antum Naqvi	Mid West Rhinos	8	14	27	5/52	26.03	3.14	49.70	2	0
Alex Falao	Mashonaland Eagles	5	8	26	7/95	17.42	4.13	25.30	3	1
Source: ESPNCricInfo
