= List of cricketers who have taken five-wicket hauls on Test debut =

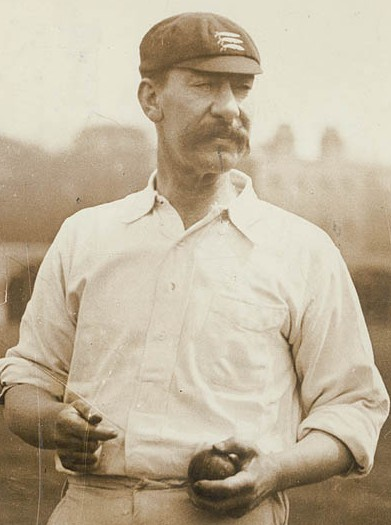
Albert Trott took eight wickets for 43 runs in his debut Test.

In cricket, a five-wicket haul (also known as a "five-for" or "fifer") refers to a bowler taking five or more wickets in a single innings. This is regarded as a notable achievement. As of November 2026, 181 cricketers have taken a five-wicket haul on debut in a Test match. Players from 11 teams that have permanent Test status have picked up five-wicket hauls on their debut, apart from Ireland. This comprises 52 of them being taken by England cricketers, 35 by Australia, 25 by South Africa, 16 by Pakistan, 11 by New Zealand, 10 each by West Indies and India, 8 by Bangladesh, 7 by Sri Lanka, 4 by Afghanistan and 3 by Zimbabwe.

Australian cricketer Billy Midwinter was the first bowler in the history of Test cricket to take a five-wicket haul on debut. He took five wickets for 78 runs in the first innings of the inaugural Test match in March 1877 at the Melbourne Cricket Ground. Two other players, Englishman Alfred Shaw (five for 38) and Australian Tom Kendall (seven for 55), also took fifers in the same match. Midwinter's and Kendall's performances ensured Australia's 45-run victory over England. Albert Trott's eight wickets for 43 runs in the second innings of the third Test of the series against England in 1894–95, are the best bowling analysis by any bowler on Test debut. Six, twenty and forty-seven bowlers have taken eight, seven and six wickets respectively in a Test innings on debut. The latest cricketer to achieve this feat is Naseer Khan Maroofkhil with 7/151 against Zimbabwe in 2026.

As of 2024, 12 players have picked up two five-wicket hauls on their Test debut. English cricketer Fred Martin was the first player to do so whereas England's Gus Atkinson is the latest bowler to take two five-wicket hauls on debut.

== Key ==
- Date – Date the match was held. Starting date of the match for Test matches.
- Overs – Number of overs bowled in that innings.
- Runs – Runs conceded.
- Wkts – Number of wickets taken.
- Batsmen – The batsmen whose wickets were taken in the five-wicket haul.
- Econ – Bowling economy rate (average runs per over).
- Inn – The innings of the match in which the five-wicket haul was taken.
- Result – The result for the team in that match.
- ♠ – The bowler was selected "Man of the match".
- * – 10 wickets or more taken in the match.

== Afghanistan ==
As of November 2026, four Afghan cricketers have taken a five-wicket haul on their debut in Test cricket. Amir Hamza became the first Afghan bowler to take a five-wicket haul on debut in Test cricket; he took five wickets for 74 runs against the West Indies at the Ekana International Cricket Stadium in Lucknow, India.

No.	Bowler	Date	Ground	Against	Inn	Overs	Runs	Wkts	Econ	Batsmen	Result
1	Amir Hamza	27 November 2019	Ekana International Cricket Stadium, Lucknow	West Indies	2	28.3	74	5	2.59	Kraigg Brathwaite; John Campbell; Shamarh Brooks; Jason Holder; Kemar Roach	Lost
2	Nijat Masood	15 June 2023	Sher-e-Bangla National Cricket Stadium, Mirpur	Bangladesh	1	16	79	5	4.93	Zakir Hasan; Mominul Haque; Mushfiqur Rahim; Taijul Islam; Shoriful Islam	Lost
3	Ziaur Rahman	20 October 2025	Harare Sports Club, Harare	Zimbabwe	2	32	97	7	3.03	Brian Bennett; Nick Welch; Brendan Taylor; Tafadzwa Tsiga; Richard Ngarava; Blessing Muzarabani; Tanaka Chivanga	Lost
4	Naseer Khan Maroofkhil	13 November 2026	Sharjah Cricket Stadium, Sharjah	Zimbabwe	1	44	151	7	3.43	Ben Curran; Innocent Kaia; Brian Bennett; Wessly Madhevere; Brendan Taylor; Graeme Cremer; Vincent Masekesa	TBD

== Australia ==
As of 2024, thirty-five Australian cricketers have taken five-wicket hauls at their debut in Test cricket. Tom Kendall was the first bowler in the history of Test cricket to take a five-wicket haul on debut. He took seven wickets for 55 runs in the second innings of the first ever Test match in March 1877 at the Melbourne Cricket Ground. His compatriot at the time, Billy Midwinter, also took five wickets for 78 runs in the match—the best bowling figures for an innings at that time. Albert Trott eight wickets for 43 runs in 1894–95 against England are the best bowling analysis by any bowler on Test debut. Todd Murphy is the latest Australian cricketer to achieve this feat; against India in February 2023, with seven wickets for 124 runs at Vidarbha Cricket Association Stadium, Nagpur.

== Bangladesh ==
As of 2018, eight Bangladeshi Test cricketers have taken a five-wicket haul on debut against four different opponents: five times against the West Indies, and once against India, Zimbabwe and England each. Naimur Rahman was the first Bangladeshi player to take a five-wicket haul on his Test debut; he took six wickets for 132 runs against India at Bangabandhu National Stadium, Dhaka in November 2000. The feat was most recently achieved by Nayeem Hasan against the West Indies at the Zohur Ahmed Chowdhury Stadium, Chittagong in November 2018, taking five wickets for 61 runs. The best bowling figures by a Bangladesh bowler on debut was achieved by Sohag Gazi, against the West Indies at the Shere Bangla National Stadium, Dhaka in November 2012; he took six wickets for 74 runs. Five of the players have taken six wickets in an innings on Test debut.

== England ==
As of July 2024, 52 English cricketers have taken a five-wicket haul on their debut in Test cricket. Alfred Shaw was the first Englishman to take a five wicket haul at Test debut. He took five wickets for 38 runs in the first Test of the history, against Australia at the Melbourne Cricket Ground in March 1877, but could not prevent England's defeat. Two Australian bowlers also picked up fifers in the same match. Dominic Cork's seven wickets for 43 runs against West Indies in the second Test of the 1995 series are the best bowling analysis on debut. The most recent Englishman to achieve the feat was Gus Atkinson, who took seven wickets for 45 runs against West Indies at Lord's in July 2024.

== India ==
As of 2026, ten Indian Test cricketers have taken five-wicket haul on debut against four different opponents: three times against Australia and West Indies each, twice against England, and once against Pakistan. Mohammad Nissar was the first Indian player to take a five-wicket haul on his Test debut; he took five wickets for 93 runs against England at the Lord's Cricket Ground, London in June 1932. Narendra Hirwani's eight wickets for 61 runs against West Indies at MA Chidambaram Stadium, Madras in January 1988, are the best bowling figures by an Indian bowler on Test debut. He is the only Indian to take eight wickets on Test debut; three other Indians have taken six wicket in an innings on Test debut. This feat was achieved by Axar Patel, against England at the M. A. Chidambaram Stadium, Chennai in February 2021; he took five wickets for 60 runs. Most recently,this feat was achieved by Manav Suthar, against Afganistan at the Maharaja Yadvindra Singh Stadium, New Chandigarh in June 2026 taking 6 wickets for 33 runs.

== New Zealand ==
As of 2025, 11 New Zealand cricketers have taken five-wicket hauls at their debuts in Test cricket. The fifers have come against six different opponents: three times against England, twice each against Pakistan, South Africa, and Zimbabwe, and once each against India and Sri Lanka. Fen Cresswell was the first New Zealander to take a fifer on Test debut, against England in 1949 at the Oval. Cresswell, Alex Moir and Colin de Grandhomme are the only three New Zealand players to take six wickets on Test debut. Zak Foulkes is the latest cricketer to achieve this feat for New Zealand; he took five wickets for 35 runs against Zimbabwe at the Queens Sports Club in Bulawayo, in August 2025.

== Pakistan ==
As of 2026, sixteen Pakistani Test cricketers have taken five-wicket haul on debut against seven different opponents: four times against Australia, three times against New Zealand and South Africa, twice against England, and once against Bangladesh, India, Sri Lanka, and Zimbabwe each. Arif Butt was the first Pakistani player to take a five-wicket haul on his Test debut; he took six wickets for 89 runs against Australia in 1964. Mohammad Zahid took seven wickets for 66 runs against New Zealand in 1996, the best bowling figures by a Pakistan bowler on debut. Seven wickets in a Test inning have been taken by four Pakistani bowlers while another five bowlers have picked up six wickets. Most recently, the feat was achieved by Saqib Khan, against Sri Lanka at the Rawalpindi Cricket Stadium in 2026; he took 7 wickets for 130 runs.

== South Africa ==
As of 2024, twenty-five South African cricketers have taken five-wicket hauls at their debut in Test cricket; 17 of these fifers came before South Africa was banned from playing due to the apartheid policy. The fifers have come against six different opponents: most frequently—15 times—against England, four times against New Zealand, twice against Australia, and once against India, Pakistan and Sri Lanka each. The first South African to take a fifer on Test debut was Albert Rose-Innes, against England in 1889. Lance Klusener was the first bowler to take a debut fifer after the country started playing competitive cricket in 1991. Klusener's eight wickets for 64 runs against India are the best bowling analysis by a South African bowler on Test debut. He is the only South African to take eight Test wickets in an innings on debut. Seven and six wickets in a Test innings have been taken by four and five South African debutantes respectively. Neil Brand is the latest cricketer to achieve this feat; he took 6/119 against New Zealand in February 2024.

== Sri Lanka ==
As of 2024, seven Sri Lanka cricketers, Kosala Kuruppuarachchi, Upul Chandana, Akila Dananjaya, Lasith Embuldeniya, Praveen Jayawickrama, Prabath Jayasuriya and Nishan Peiris have taken five wicket hauls on their Test debuts. Both Kosala Kuruppuarachchi and Upul Chandana achieved the feat against Pakistan, while Akila Dananjaya and Praveen Jayawickrama achieved the feat against Bangladesh, Lasith Embuldeniya achieved his feat against South Africa, and Prabath Jayasuriya against Australia. Kuruppuarachchi took five wickets at Colombo Cricket Club Ground in 1986 whereas Chandana's fifer came during the 1998–99 Asian Test Championship at Bangabandhu National Stadium, Dhaka. Chandana took six wickets for 179 runs in a losing cause, and Embuldeniya took five wickets for 66 runs in the third innings of the match. Jayawickrama took six wickets for 92 runs in the second innings of the match, while Prabath Jayasuriya took 6/59 in his second innings.

== West Indies ==
As of 2014, ten Test cricketers from the West Indies have taken five-wicket haul on debut against five different opponents: four times against England, twice against India and Australia, and once each against Pakistan and Sri Lanka. Hines Johnson was the first West Indian player to take a five-wicket haul on his Test debut; he took five wickets for 41 runs against England in March 1948. Alf Valentine took eight wickets for 104 runs at Old Trafford in 1950, the best bowling figures by a West Indian bowler on debut. He is the only West Indian to take eight wickets in an innings on Test debut. Darren Sammy and Franklyn Rose took seven and six wickets on Test debut. Most recently the feat was achieved by Shamar Joseph, who took five wickets for 94 runs against Australia at the Adelaide Oval, Adelaide, January 2024.

== Zimbabwe ==
As of 2025, 3 Zimbabwean cricketers, Andy Blignaut, John Nyumbu and Vincent Masekesa have taken five-wicket hauls on their Test debuts. Blignaut's five wicket haul came against Bangladesh in April 2001 at the Queens Sports Club, Bulawayo. Zimbabwe won the match by an innings and 32 runs. Nyumbu took his five wickets against South Africa in August 2014 at the Harare Sports Club, Harare.

No.	Bowler	Date	Ground	Against	Inn	Overs	Runs	Wkts	Econ	Batsmen	Result
1	Andy Blignaut	19 April 2001	Queens Sports Club, Bulawayo	Bangladesh	1	23.3	73	5	3.10	Mehrab Hossain; Habibul Bashar; Aminul Islam; Mushfiqur Rahman; Mohammad Sharif	Won
2	John Nyumbu	9 August 2014	Harare Sports Club, Harare	South Africa	1	49.3	157	5	3.17	Alviro Petersen; Faf du Plessis; AB de Villiers; JP Duminy; Dale Steyn	Lost
3	Vincent Masekesa	28 April 2025	Zohur Ahmed Chowdhury Stadium, Chittagong	Bangladesh	1	31.2	115	5	3.67	Najmul Hossain Shanto; Jaker Ali; Mehidy Hasan Miraz; Nayeem Hasan; Taijul Islam	Lost

== Two five-wicket hauls on debut ==
As of July 2024, twelve cricketers have taken two five-wicket hauls on their Test debut. English cricketer Fred Martin was the first player to do so; he took six wickets for 50 and six wickets for 52 on his debut, against Australia in the second match of the 1890 Ashes series. England's Gus Atkinson is the latest bowler to take two five-wicket hauls on debut. He took 7/45 and 5/61 against West Indies during the first Test of the 2024 series between the teams.

India's Narendra Hirwani took the best match figures by any bowler on Test debut. He took eight for 61 and eight for 75 on his debut, against the West Indies during the fourth Test of the 1987–88 series between the teams.

== See also ==
- List of cricketers who have taken five wickets on ODI debut
- List of cricketers who have taken five-wicket hauls on Women Test debut
