= Zimbabwean cricket team in Bangladesh in 2025 =

International cricket tour

	Bangladesh	Zimbabwe
- Dates: 20 April – 2 May 2025
Captains	Najmul Hossain Shanto	Craig Ervine

Test series
- Result: 2-match series drawn 1–1
Most runs	Mominul Haque (136); Shadman Islam (136)	Sean Williams (142)
Most wickets	Mehidy Hasan Miraz (15)	Blessing Muzarabani (10)
- Player of the series: Mehidy Hasan Miraz (Ban)

The Zimbabwe cricket team toured Bangladesh in April and May 2025 to play two Test matches. In March 2025, the Bangladesh Cricket Board (BCB) confirmed the fixtures for the tour, as a part of the 2025 home international season of the Bangladesh cricket team.

Originally, the tour was scheduled to include three ODIs and three T20Is under the Future Tours Programme (FTP). Later it was rescheduled to two Tests only.

== Squads ==
Bangladesh	Zimbabwe
Najmul Hossain Shanto (c); Khaled Ahmed; Jaker Ali (wk); Mahidul Islam Ankon (wk); Anamul Haque (Note: In squad for second Test only.); Mominul Haque; Nayeem Hasan; Zakir Hasan (wk) (Note: In squad for first Test only.); Mahmudul Hasan Joy; Mehidy Hasan Miraz; Shadman Islam; Taijul Islam; Tanvir Islam; Hasan Mahmud; Mushfiqur Rahim (wk); Nahid Rana; Tanzim Hasan Sakib	Craig Ervine (c); Brian Bennett; Johnathan Campbell; Ben Curran; Trevor Gwandu; Wesley Madhevere; Wellington Masakadza; Vincent Masekesa; Nyasha Mayavo (wk); Blessing Muzarabani; Richard Ngarava; Victor Nyauchi; Tafadzwa Tsiga (wk); Nick Welch; Sean Williams

On 23 April, Bangladesh added Anamul Haque and Tanvir Islam into the squad for the second Test, replacing Zakir Hasan and Nahid Rana.

== Test series ==
=== 1st Test ===
20–23 April 2025
Scorecard

Bangladesh	v	Zimbabwe
191 (61 overs); Mominul Haque 56 (105); Wellington Masakadza 3/21 (10 overs)		273 (80.2 overs); Sean Williams 59 (108); Mehidy Hasan Miraz 5/52 (20.2 overs)
255 (79.2 overs); Najmul Hossain Shanto 60 (105); Blessing Muzarabani 6/72 (20.2 overs)		174/7 (50.1 overs); Brian Bennett 54 (81); Mehidy Hasan Miraz 5/50 (22.1 overs)

Zimbabwe won by 3 wickets
Sylhet International Cricket Stadium, Sylhet
Umpires: Richard Illingworth (Eng) and Richard Kettleborough (Eng)
Player of the match: Blessing Muzarabani (Zim)

- Bangladesh won the toss and elected to bat.
- Blessing Muzarabani took his 50th wicket in Tests, becoming the joint-fastest Zimbabwe bowler to reach there (in 11 matches).
- Mehidy Hasan Miraz (Ban) took his 200th wicket in Tests. He also took the most ten-wicket hauls (3) in Tests for Bangladesh going past Shakib Al Hasan and Taijul Islam.

=== 2nd Test ===
28–30 April 2025
Scorecard

Zimbabwe	v	Bangladesh
227 (90.1 overs); Sean Williams 67 (166); Taijul Islam 6/60 (27.1 overs)		444 (129.2 overs); Shadman Islam 120 (181); Vincent Masekesa 5/115 (31.2 overs)
111 (46.2 overs); Ben Curran 46 (103); Mehidy Hasan Miraz 5/32 (21 overs)

Bangladesh won by an innings and 106 runs
Zohur Ahmed Chowdhury Stadium, Chittagong
Umpires: Kumar Dharmasena (SL) and Richard Illingworth (Eng)
Player of the match: Mehidy Hasan Miraz (Ban)

- Zimbabwe won the toss and elected to bat.
- Tanzim Hasan Sakib (Ban) and Vincent Masekesa (Zim) both made their Test debuts.
- Vincent Masekesa (Zim) took his first five-wicket haul in Tests.
- Mehidy Hasan Miraz became the third Bangladeshi cricketer to achieve the double of scoring a century and taking a five-wicket haul in a test match. He also became the second cricketer after Ian Botham to achieve this feat on the same day of a test match.
- David Boon officiated in his last match as a match referee.
