= Clifford Gibbs =

New Zealand cricketer

Personal information
- Full name: Clifford Samuel Gibbs
- Born: 19 February 1905; Woodend, New Zealand
- Died: 2 July 1976 (aged 71); Christchurch, New Zealand
- Batting: Right-handed
- Bowling: Slow left-arm orthodox

Domestic team information
- Years: Team
- 1929/30: Canterbury
- Only FC: 28 February 1930 Canterbury v Otago
- Source: Cricinfo, 17 October 2020

Clifford Samuel Gibbs (19 February 1905 – 2 July 1976) was a New Zealand cricketer. He played in one first-class match in the Plunket Shield for Canterbury in 1930 and played in the Hawke Cup for Marlborough.

== Early life and family ==
Gibbs was born at Woodend, near Rangiora, on 19 February 1905. His father, Samuel Gibbs, was a sheep breeder who also worked in the frozen meat industry. Gibbs was educated at Elmwood School and St Andrew's College in Christchurch. On 5 April 1928, he married Edna Mary Heslop at St Paul's Methodist Church in Sumner. The couple had twin sons born in 1934.

== Cricket ==
He played club cricket for Riccarton Cricket Club, before moving to the West Christchurch club in 1930 as part of a voluntary change of players from stronger clubs in the local system, including Riccarton, in order to strengthen weaker sides, including the West Christchurch club, which had found it difficult to field competitive sides since an Old Boys side had joined the league.

By 1925 he was playing for Riccarton's 'B' side and was described as being their "star player". He went on to make his senior club debut later in the same season, playing against the St Albans club in February 1926. He scored 20 runs on debut in a low Riccarton total, The Star newspaper writing that "he is to be complimented on the way in which he batted when things were going badly for his side". It described him as having "a good defence and quite a number of useful scoring shots". Gibbs was one of the leading bowlers in the 1926/1927 season in Christchurch club cricket, taking 49 wickets, including a hat-trick, at an average of 11.55. Although less successful with the bat that season, he was considered unlucky not to gain a trial for the Canterbury provincial team, and The Star newspaper opined that Gibbs was "undoubtedly one of the most promising young bowlers in Christchurch to-day" and that "there is no doubt that he will gain his representative cap in a year or two".

In December 1929, Gibbs was added to the Canterbury provincial training squad, and on 1 January 1930 he played in a one-day match for Canterbury 'B' against the West Coast at Hagley Park, scoring 13 runs batting at number four and taking one wicket for four runs off four overs. The following month, he was named in the Canterbury team to face Otago in a Plunket Shield match at Lancaster Park. In that match, Gibbs opened the bowling for Canterbury with Jim Burrows, and although wicketless in the first innings (0/40 from 16 overs), his sharp fielding led to the run out of Sonny Moloney. Canterbury scored 523 for 7 declared in their first innings, and Gibbs was not required to bat. In Otago's second innings, Gibbs took one wicket for 23 runs from his nine overs, as Otago fell to a defeat by an innings and 227 runs. The match was Gibbs' only first-class appearance.

Later in the 1929/1930 season, Gibbs was a member of the Riccarton team that defeated Old Boys in the final to win the Canterbury Cricket Association championship.

After moving to Blenheim, where he worked as an auctioneer, Gibbs made two appearances playing for Marlborough in the Hawke Cup. In the first of those matches, against Nelson on 7–8 December 1934, at Horton Park in Blenheim, he took two catches and returned bowling figures of none for five runs from five overs in Nelson's first innings, before taking four for 29 from 9.4 overs in the second innings. He scored 25 runs batting at number eight in Marlborough's first innings, and was dismissed for a duck in the second innings, as Marlborough won the match by three wickets. Unavailable for Marlborough's Hawke Cup challenge against Manawatu the following February, Gibbs next played in the Hawke Cup for Marlborough the next season against Nelson, at Trafalgar Park, Nelson, on 29–30 November 1935. In the match, which was won by Nelson by an innings and 104 runs, Gibbs returned figures of 0/58 from 23 overs in Nelson's one innings, and scored 12 and 28, respectively, in Marlborough's two turns at bat.

Early in the 1936/1937 season, Gibbs took all ten wickets in an innings, for 30 runs, playing in the Marlborough senior club competition.

In 1937, Gibbs moved to Hastings, where he worked as a stock and station agent, and, during World War II, served as an officer in the Hastings Battalion of the Home Guard. Gibbs played two matches for the Hawke's Bay cricket team during the war. He took seven wickets (5/51 in the first innings and 2/65 in the second), took one catch, and scored 13 runs, as Hawke's Bay beat Poverty Bay by nine wickets to secure the Kirk Cup at Nelson Park in Napier on 26–27 February 1940. The following season, in a drawn match against Wairarapa at Nelson Park in April 1941, he scored 42 runs in his one turn at bat, and took one wicket for 32 runs in Wairarapa's first innings.

== Working life ==
After leaving school, Gibbs found employment as a cadet at the New Zealand Farmers' Cooperative Association. After a short period at head office in Christchurch, he moved to the stock department as a clerk. Around 1932, he began auctioning veal, and later store cattle and dairy cattle, at the Addington market. He transferred to Blenheim as a stock auctioneer in 1935, before moving to Hastings in 1937, where he worked as a stock auctioneer for Williams & Kettle.

Gibbs returned to the Farmers' Cooperative in Christchurch as a stock auctioneer in 1948. By the end of that year he had become a wool auctioneer, in which role he remained until his retirement in 1969. Over 21 years, he officiated at 115 wool sales, selling 513,933 bales with a total value of $65,224,000. He also served as chairman of the Christchurch Woolbrokers' Association.

== Other activities ==
A recreational golfer, Gibbs served terms as club captain and president of the Russley Golf Club in Christchurch. He made connections with Operation Deep Freeze personnel, and in November 1960 he briefly visited Antarctica and flew over the South Pole.

== Later life and death ==
Gibbs died at Christchurch on 2 July 1976, at the age of 71. His wife, Edna Gibbs, died in 1998.
