= Arthur Cresswell =

New Zealand cricketer (1917–2002)

Personal information
- Full name: Arthur Edward Cresswell
- Born: 7 August 1917; Christchurch, New Zealand
- Died: 3 August 2002 (aged 84); Blenheim, New Zealand
- Batting: Right-handed
- Bowling: Right-arm fast-medium
- Relatives: Fen Cresswell (brother)

Domestic team information
- Years: Team
- 1948/49–1949/50: Wellington
- 1950/51–1951/52: Central Districts

Career statistics
Competition	First-class
Matches	13
Runs scored	96
Batting average	8.00
100s/50s	0/0
Top score	18
Balls bowled	2,178
Wickets	38
Bowling average	22.55
5 wickets in innings	2
10 wickets in match	0
Best bowling	5/32
Catches/stumpings	7/–
- Source: Cricinfo, 21 April 2017

Arthur Edward Cresswell (7 August 1917 – 3 August 2002) was a New Zealand cricketer who played for Wellington and was one of the first players who played for Central Districts in the early 1950s. He was the younger brother of Fen Cresswell.

A right-arm fast-medium bowler, Cresswell was first selected for Marlborough as an 18-year-old in 1935 from the Wairau Club. During World War II he served in the New Zealand Army and was a leading member of the New Zealand Army XI, along with players such as Bert Sutcliffe and Verdun Scott.

After the war Cresswell was unhappy with the opportunities to play regular cricket in Marlborough and decided to play club cricket in Wellington, commuting from Blenheim to Wellington by Tiger Moth aeroplane every weekend.

Cresswell played for Wellington between 1948 and 1950 and Central Districts between 1950 and 1952, finishing his career with 13 first-class matches in which he took 38 wickets at 22.55. His best innings figures came in his second first-class match, for Wellington against Canterbury at Wellington in 1948–49, when he took 3 for 41 and 5 for 32 in an eight-wicket victory for Wellington; his best match figures came two weeks later in the next match, against Otago in Dunedin, when he took 5 for 57 and 4 for 58. He was one of the New Zealand Cricket Almanack Players of the Year in 1949.
