= Vincent Masekesa =

Zimbabwean cricketer (born 1997)

Personal information
- Born: 27 March 1997 (age 29)
- Batting: Right-handed
- Bowling: Right arm leg break
- Role: Bowler

International information
- National side: Zimbabwe
- Test debut (cap 136): 28 April 2025 v Bangladesh
- Last Test: 7 August 2025 v New Zealand

Domestic team information
- Years: Team
- 2021–present: Mountaineers

Career statistics
Competition	Test	FC	LA
Matches	4	24	8
Runs scored	38	531	71
Batting average	5.42	16.59	23.66
100s/50s	0/0	0/0	0/0
Top score	11*	44*	35
Balls bowled	572	3,984	354
Wickets	10	81	11
Bowling average	46.20	35.30	31.27
5 wickets in innings	1	6	0
10 wickets in match	0	1	0
Best bowling	5/115	7/117	4/31
Catches/stumpings	2/–	17/–	4/–
- Source: Cricinfo, 9 August 2025

Vincent Masekesa (born 27 March 1997) is a Zimbabwean cricketer, who plays for Mountaineers in domestic cricket. He is a leg-spin bowler and useful lower-order batsman.

== Career ==
Masekesa made his first-class debut against Southern Rocks on 30 March 2021 during the 2020–21 Logan Cup. He made his List A debut against Mid West Rhinos on 9 October 2022 during the 2022–23 Pro50 Championship. He was the leading wicket-taker in the 2024–25 Logan Cup, with 43 wickets at an average of 22.02, with best figures of 7 for 117 and 5 for 63 in Mountaineers' victory over Rhinos.

In January 2025, Masekesa was named in Zimbabwe's squad for their one-off Test match against Ireland, but he was left out of the playing eleven. In April 2025, he was again selected to the Test squad for the series against Bangladesh. He made his Test debut in the same series on 28 April 2025. He took his first five-wicket haul on his Test debut and became third Zimbabwean bowler to do so and became the eighth Zimbabwean bowler to take a fifer.
