= Alex Russell (cricketer) =

English cricketer (born 2002)

Personal information
- Full name: Alexander Kian Russell
- Born: 17 April 2002 (age 24); Newport, Wales
- Batting: Right-handed
- Bowling: Right-arm leg-spin

Domestic team information
- Years: Team
- 2022–2024: Northamptonshire
- 2023/24–2024/25: Mashonaland Eagles
- 2024–2025: Wales National Counties

Career statistics
Competition	FC	LA	T20
Matches	20	20	3
Runs scored	97	14	1
Batting average	8.81	14.00	–
100s/50s	0/0	0/0	0/0
Top score	17*	7	1*
Balls bowled	3,619	1,004	66
Wickets	87	22	2
Bowling average	32.36	43.86	41.00
5 wickets in innings	10	0	0
10 wickets in match	4	0	0
Best bowling	7/84	3/15	1/27
Catches/stumpings	3/–	3/–	0/–
- Source: Cricinfo, 9 March 2025

Alexander Kian Russell (born 17 April 2002) is an English cricketer, born in Wales. He has played for Northamptonshire in England and Mashonaland Eagles in Zimbabwe.

Russell was educated in Gloucestershire at Chosen Hill School and Hartpury College, where he studied for a Diploma in Sport and Exercise Science. A leg-spin bowler and tail-end batsman, he made his first-class debut for Northamptonshire in the 2023 season. In his second match he took 6 for 175 when Northamptonshire lost to Kent by an innings and 15 runs.

Russell began playing for Mashonaland Eagles in the 2023–24 Zimbabwe season. In consecutive matches in the Logan Cup in January 2024 he took 6 for 72 and 4 for 192 against Mountaineers and 5 for 38 and 7 for 84 against Matabeleland Tuskers. He finished as the top wicket-taker in the competition with 37 wickets at an average of 30.97 and an economy rate of 4.98 runs per over. He was equal second in the 2024–25 Logan Cup, with 41 wickets at an average of 29.29, and took five or more wickets in an innings six times.

Russell's contract with Northamptonshire ended after the 2024 season. In 2025, Russell played as a professional for Bridgwater in the West of England Premier League. He was the leading wicket-taker in the competition, with 42 at an average of 17.33, and Bridgwater won the title. He also played for Wales National Counties in minor counties cricket.
