= Mathew Welch =

Zimbabwean cricketer (born 2003)

Personal information
- Full name: Mathew Daniel Welch
- Born: 6 October 2003 (age 23); Harare, Zimbabwe
- Batting: Right-handed
- Role: Batsman
- Relatives: Nick Welch (brother)

Domestic team information
- Years: Team
- 2021/22–2023/24: Mashonaland Eagles
- 2024/25–: Mountaineers

Career statistics
Competition	FC	LA	T20
Matches	19	16	22
Runs scored	1,142	409	207
Batting average	36.83	27.26	12.17
100s/50s	2/6	0/2	0/0
Top score	133	65	35
Catches/stumpings	10/–	5/1	8/–
- Source: Cricinfo, 26 January 2026

Mathew Daniel Welch (born 6 October 2003) is a Zimbabwean cricketer who has played first-class cricket for Mashonaland Eagles and Mountaineers.

Welch made his first-class debut as a concussion substitute for Tinashe Kamunhukamwe during Mashonaland Eagles' Logan Cup match against Matabeleland Tuskers in December 2023. He opened the second innings and scored 90. Two matches later he made his first century, 133 against Southern Rocks, putting on 295 for the opening stand with Kamunhukamwe. He joined his brother Nick at the Mountaineers for the 2024–25 season, scoring 75 and 89 in his first match.
