= Fen Cresswell =

New Zealand cricketer (1915–1966)

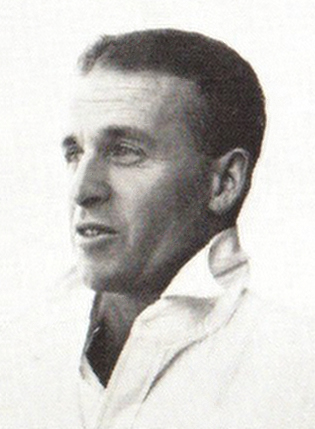

Personal information
- Full name: George Fenwick Cresswell
- Born: 22 March 1915; Wanganui, New Zealand
- Died: 10 January 1966 (aged 50); Blenheim, New Zealand
- Nickname: The Ferret
- Batting: Left-handed
- Bowling: Right-arm medium
- Relatives: Arthur Cresswell (brother)

International information
- National side: New Zealand (1949–1951)
- Test debut (cap 50): 13 August 1949 v England
- Last Test: 24 March 1951 v England

Domestic team information
- Years: Team
- 1949/50: Wellington
- 1950/51–1954/55: Central Districts

Career statistics
Competition	Test	First-class
Matches	3	33
Runs scored	14	89
Batting average	7.00	5.23
100s/50s	0/0	0/0
Top score	12*	12*
Balls bowled	650	8,107
Wickets	13	124
Bowling average	22.46	22.53
5 wickets in innings	1	8
10 wickets in match	0	0
Best bowling	6/168	8/100
Catches/stumpings	0/–	11/–
- Source: Cricinfo, 1 April 2017

George Fenwick Cresswell (22 March 1915 – 10 January 1966) was a cricketer who played three Test matches for New Zealand. Born in Wanganui, he was the older brother of Arthur Cresswell. He was the 50th Test cap for New Zealand.

== Cricket career ==
Cresswell was educated at Marlborough Boys' College, where he played for the first XI. An accurate medium-pace bowler, he had played his cricket for Marlborough in the Hawke Cup when he was selected to make his first-class debut at the age of 33 in a trial match for The Rest against a New Zealand XI in January 1949. After taking three wickets in the match he was selected for the 1949 tour to England.

On the tour of England, Cresswell often opened the bowling as, despite not being express pace, he was noted for his ability to swing the ball. Cresswell dismissed many opening batsmen with well pitched inswingers. He took 62 wickets at 26.09 in 19 matches, and found his best form late in the season, taking 5 for 30 against Yorkshire and 6 for 21 against Glamorgan. He made his Test debut in the final Test against England at The Oval. He opened the bowling with Jack Cowie, and took 6 for 168 in England's only innings. Batting at his usual position of number 11, he made 12 not out, which remained his highest first-class score. As of early 2021 he is still the oldest person (at 34 years and 146 days) to take five or more wickets in an innings in his first Test.

He played for Wellington in 1949–50. He also played for New Zealand against the touring Australian team, taking 8 for 100 in Australia's only innings; then, batting at number 11, he put on an unbroken partnership of nine runs with Walter Hadlee to avert an innings defeat. Earlier in the season, captaining Marlborough in a Hawke Cup elimination match against Nelson, he took 16 wickets in the match (8 for 44 and 8 for 46) but Nelson won by two wickets.

In 1950–51 Cresswell played for Central Districts in their inaugural Plunket Shield season, taking 5 for 31 against Canterbury at Palmerston North and 5 for 38 against Auckland at New Plymouth to give them victory in their first two home games and second place in the final table. He played in the two Tests against the visiting English side, taking 7 wickets at 17.71. After that he suffered from a back injury, and played only three matches in the next four seasons before retiring in 1956.

Cresswell had an unusual run-up and bowling action. Dick Brittenden wrote: "he bowled from a run of a few paces. He began each time by standing stiffly to attention, poised for an appreciable little interval. Then he moved in and bowled with one of the strangest of actions – no left arm, and his chest quite square to the batsman."

Cresswell's younger brother Arthur also played as a pace bowler for Wellington and Central Districts in the same period.

== Death ==
Cresswell was found dead at his home in Blenheim in January 1966, with a shotgun next to him. He had been suffering from cancer.

== See also ==
- List of New Zealand cricketers who have taken five-wicket hauls on Test debut
