= Marlborough cricket team =

New Zealand cricket team

Personnel
- Owner: Marlborough Cricket Association

Team information
- Founded: 1886
- Home ground: Horton Park, Blenheim

History
- Hawke Cup wins: 3
- Official website: Marlborough Cricket Association

The Marlborough cricket team represents the Marlborough Region of the South Island of New Zealand. It is one of the 21 teams from around New Zealand that compete in the Hawke Cup. Its base is in Blenheim.

== History ==
=== Early years ===
A Marlborough Cricket Club was formed in Blenheim in late 1860. The first properly organised match in the region appears to have been held at Blenheim in January 1862, between Blenheim and Picton, in a paddock belonging to the Resident Magistrate, S. L. Muller. Picton won.

Marlborough teams travelled to play interprovincial matches against Nelson in Nelson in March 1863 and against Wellington in Wellington in March 1866. Marlborough lost both matches, by 42 runs and 45 runs respectively.

The Marlborough Cricket Association was formed in October 1886 by five clubs from Blenheim, Picton, Spring Creek, Wairau and Havelock. Apart from establishing a local competition, the main intention was that Marlborough should be able to host a match against the touring English team later that season, but that tour did not eventuate. It was not until January 1903 that an overseas touring team played in Marlborough, when the English touring team Lord Hawke's XI beat a Marlborough XXII by nine wickets in a two-day match at the Wairau Cricket Club's ground in Blenheim.

=== Hawke Cup years ===
Marlborough competed for the Hawke Cup for the first time in 1912–13, the third season of the competition, when the title was decided in a final match after preliminary rounds. Marlborough's scheduled preliminary matches were cancelled, and so the three-day final against South Auckland in Hamilton was Marlborough's first Hawke Cup match. South Auckland won by 87 runs. For Marlborough, Roy Pearpoint took six wickets in each innings.

After the Wairau club ground was sold for development, Marlborough moved to nearby Horton Park, playing their first match there in December 1919 against the Thorndon club from Wellington. Marlborough won by an innings and 133 runs, Edgar Neale scoring 201.

Central Districts, of which Marlborough is one of the eight constituent associations, began playing in the Plunket Shield in the 1950–51 season. Marlborough's first player in the Central Districts team was Fen Cresswell, who played in their inaugural Plunket Shield match. His brother and Marlborough teammate Arthur joined him in the team for the second match, when they opened the bowling together and took 12 wickets in Central Districts’ first victory. Between 1972 and 2002 Central Districts played nine Plunket Shield and three one-day matches at Horton Park.

Marlborough have competed regularly in the Hawke Cup ever since 1913. They won the title for the first time in January 1968 when they defeated Hutt Valley by 77 runs. The Test player Gary Bartlett captained Marlborough, and scored more runs and took more wickets than anyone else in the match. Marlborough have since won the title twice: in February 1994, when they narrowly beat Manawatu, and February 2011, when they beat Otago Country by an innings.
