= Horton Park, Blenheim =

Cricket ground in Blenheim, New Zealand

Coordinates: 41°31′05.29″S 173°57′44.68″E

Horton Park
- Interactive map of Horton Park

Ground information
- Location: Blenheim, New Zealand
- Country: New Zealand
- Establishment: 1919 (first recorded match)

Team information
Central Districts	(1972–2002)
Marlborough	(1919–present)
- As of 26 November 2021; Source: Ground profile

Horton Park is a cricket ground in Blenheim, Marlborough, New Zealand. The ground is on Redwood Street, on the southern edge of Blenheim's central business district.

The reserve, formerly known as the Domain, was named Horton Park in 1907 after Thomas Horton, the local who had ensured the use of the land as a recreational reserve in the late 19th century. The Marlborough cricket team moved its home ground to Horton Park in late 1919 after the nearby Wairau club's ground was sold for development. The first club match there took place on 22 November 1919. Marlborough played for the first time there a month later, a match against the Thorndon club from Wellington.

Horton Park held its first first-class match in December 1972 when Central Districts played Northern Districts in the 1972/73 Plunket Shield. Over the following thirty years, Central Districts played nine further first-class matches there, the last of which came against Auckland in the 2002/03 State Championship. The first List A match held there came when Central Districts played Otago in the 1977/78 Gillette Cup. Two further List A matches have been played there, with Central Districts playing Northern Districts in the 1980/81 and 1993/94 Shell Cup.

The ground is the headquarters and home ground of the Marlborough Cricket Association.
