= Zimbabwe national cricket team =

Zimbabwe
- Nickname: The Chevrons
- Association: Zimbabwe Cricket

Personnel
- Test captain: Richard Ngarava
- One Day captain: Richard Ngarava
- T20I captain: Sikandar Raza
- Coach: Justin Sammons

History
- Test status acquired: 1992

International Cricket Council
- ICC status: Associate Member (1981); Full Member (1992)
- ICC region: ACA (Africa)
ICC Rankings	Current	Best-ever
Test	10th	8th
ODI	11th	7th
T20I	11th	9th

Tests
- First Test: v. India at Harare Sports Club, Harare; 18–22 October 1992
- Last Test: v. Afghanistan at Sharjah Cricket Stadium, Sharjah; 13–17 November 2026
Tests	Played	Won/Lost
Total	132	17/84 (31 draws)
This year	3	2/0 (1 draw)

One Day Internationals
- First ODI: v. Australia at Trent Bridge, Nottingham; 9 June 1983
- Last ODI: v. Afghanistan at Sharjah Cricket Stadium, Sharjah; 23 October 2026
ODIs	Played	Won/Lost
Total	592	157/411 (8 ties, 16 no results)
This year	9	3/6 (0 ties, 0 no results)
- World Cup appearances: 9 (first in 1983)
- Best result: Super Sixes (1999, 2003)
- World Cup Qualifier appearances: 5 (first in 1982)
- Best result: Champions (1982, 1986, 1990)

T20 Internationals
- First T20I: v. Bangladesh at Sheikh Abu Naser Stadium, Khulna; 28 November 2006
- Last T20I: v. Afghanistan at Sharjah Cricket Stadium, Sharjah; 1 November 2026
T20Is	Played	Won/Lost
Total	206	71/130 (2 ties, 3 no results)
This year	20	6/14 (0 ties, 0 no results)
- T20 World Cup appearances: 7 (first in 2007)
- Best result: Super 8 (2026)
- T20 World Cup Qualifier appearances: 3 (Note: T20 World Cup Qualifier refers to the Regional Final of the ICC Africa region from the 2023 edition.) (first in 2022)
- Best result: Champions (2022, 2025)
Test kit
ODI kit
T20I kit
- As of 17 November 2026

The Zimbabwe men's national cricket team, also known as the Chevrons, represents Zimbabwe in men's international cricket and is overseen by Zimbabwe Cricket. Zimbabwe has been a full member of the International Cricket Council (ICC) since 1992. As of October 2026, Zimbabwe was ranked 11th by the ICC in Tests, 10th One Day Internationals (ODIs) and 12th in Twenty20 internationals (T20Is).

== History ==
=== Before Test status ===
Zimbabwe – known as Rhodesia until 1980 – had a national cricket team before it achieved Test status.

A summary of key moments:

- Rhodesia was represented in the South African domestic cricket tournament, the Currie Cup, sporadically from 1904 to 1932, and then regularly from 1946 until independence.
- Following independence, the country began to play more international cricket.
- On 21 July 1981, Zimbabwe became an associate member of the ICC.
- Zimbabwe participated in the 1983 Cricket World Cup, as well as the 1987 and 1992 events.

Zimbabwe's first World Cup campaign in 1983 ended at the group stage, as they lost five of their six matches. However, they threw a surprise against Australia. Batting first, Zimbabwe reached a total of 239 for 6 in the allotted 60 overs, with skipper Duncan Fletcher top-scoring with 69 not out. Fletcher then produced career-best bowling figures of 4 for 42 to restrict Australia to 226 for 7, thereby recording a stunning upset in cricket history. Surprisingly, this was their first ever official ODI match.

9 June
Scorecard

Zimbabwe; 239/6 (60 overs)	v	Australia; 226/7 (60 overs)
Duncan Fletcher 69* (84); Graham Yallop 2/28 (9 overs)		Kepler Wessels 76 (130); Duncan Fletcher 4/42 (11 overs)

Zimbabwe won by 13 runs
Trent Bridge, Nottingham
Umpires: David Constant and Mervyn Kitchen
Player of the match: Duncan Fletcher (Zim)

- Australia elected to bowl first
- Zimbabwe’s first ever ODI match

In the 1987 Cricket World Cup, Zimbabwe lost all six of their group-stage matches, though they came very close to winning against New Zealand. Chasing 243 to win from 50 overs, wicketkeeper-batsman David Houghton scored 142, but Zimbabwe were all out for 239 in the final over, with two balls still remaining, thus losing by three runs.

In the 1992 tournament, Zimbabwe failed to progress beyond the round-robin stage, losing seven of their eight matches, though there were two notable achievements. Against Sri Lanka in their first match, Zimbabwe posted their then-highest total of 312 for 4, with wicketkeeper-batsman Andy Flower top-scoring with 115 not out. However, the Sri Lankans chased this total down with four balls to spare, winning by three wickets.

In their final match, Zimbabwe faced England in an inconsequential encounter, England having already made the semi-finals. Batting first, Zimbabwe were all out for 134. Eddo Brandes then produced a stunning spell of 4 for 21, including dismissing Graham Gooch the first ball, to help restrict England to 125 all out and thus give Zimbabwe a shock nine-run victory.

These twenty World Cup matches were Zimbabwe's only international games during this period.

=== 1992–1996: early years of Test status ===
Zimbabwe was granted Test status by the ICC in July 1992 and played its first Test match in October that year, against India at Harare Sports Club. They became the ninth Test nation.

Zimbabwe's early Test performances were consistently weak, leading to suggestions that they had been granted Test status prematurely. Of their first 30 Test matches, they won just one, at home against Pakistan in early 1995.

In the one-day arena, however, the team soon became competitive, if not particularly strong. In particular, world respect was gained for their fielding ability.

=== 1997–2002: the golden era ===
Old logo of the Zimbabwe Cricket Union

Despite his team's difficulties, wicket-keeper/batsman Andy Flower was at one point rated the best batsman in world cricket. During this era, Zimbabwe also produced such cricketers as Flower's brother Grant, and allrounders Andy Blignaut and Heath Streak (who was later appointed national captain). Murray Goodwin was also a world-class batsman; following his retirement from international cricket, he has scored heavily for Sussex. Another world-class batsman was David Houghton, who holds the record for the highest individual Test score for Zimbabwe of 266 against Sri Lanka in 1994/95. Sometime captain and middle-order batsman Alistair Campbell, leg-spinning all-rounder Paul Strang, Eddo Brandes, and pace bowler/opener Neil Johnson were other important contributors for Zimbabwe on the world stage at this time.

With the appearance of these quality players, a breakthrough was achieved in levels of performance in the late 1990s where the Zimbabwean team began winning Tests against other nations, which included a series win against Pakistan. Unfortunately, the political situation in Zimbabwe declined at around the same time, which had a detrimental effect on the national team's performances.

Zimbabwe performed well at the 1999 Cricket World Cup, coming in fifth place in the Super Sixes and only missing out on a semi-final place due to having an inferior net run-rate than New Zealand.

In the group stage, Zimbabwe beat India by three runs, before facing their neighbours South Africa, then the best team in the world. Batting first, Zimbabwe made 233 for 6, with a well-fought 76 by opening batsman Neil Johnson. In reply, South Africa collapsed to 40 for 6, before Lance Klusener and Shaun Pollock scored half-centuries to reduce the margin of defeat to 48 runs. This was South Africa's first defeat against Zimbabwe and one of Zimbabwe's most famous wins. Neil Johnson also excelled with the ball, taking three wickets and claiming the Man of the Match award. Johnson quit playing for Zimbabwe after this tournament.

During this period, Zimbabwe beat all Test-playing nations (except Australia, India) regularly in ODI series. Zimbabwe beat New Zealand both home and away in 2000–2001. The team also reached the finals of many multi-national one-day tournaments.

=== 2003–2004: signs of decline ===
The increasing politicization of cricket, including selectorial policy, along with the declining situation in Zimbabwe disrupted the 2003 Cricket World Cup, which was jointly hosted by Zimbabwe, Kenya and South Africa. England forfeited a match scheduled to be played in Zimbabwe, risking their own progress through the competition, citing "security concerns" as their reason. Zimbabwean players Andy Flower and fast bowler Henry Olonga wore black armbands, for "mourning the death of democracy" in Zimbabwe. Both were immediately dismissed from the team and applied for political asylum overseas. This public political protest caused considerable embarrassment to the co-hosts and disrupted team harmony. Since the 2003 World Cup, with a succession of Zimbabwe's best players ending their international careers early, a new team began to develop, featuring the likes of Travis Friend, Andy Blignaut, Hamilton Masakadza, Douglas Hondo, Craig Wishart, Ray Price, Sean Ervine, Mark Vermeulen, Tatenda Taibu, Elton Chigumbura, Prosper Utseya, Dougie Marillier, and Barney Rogers. Whilst not of the same caliber of Streak, Goodwin, and the Flower brothers, this new breed of predominantly multi-disciplined players formed a solid backbone to a competitive, if usually unsuccessful, team.

In late 2003, Zimbabwe toured Australia in a two-match series. The series was more memorable for Australian opener Matthew Hayden's innings in the first Test – in which he overcame a back strain to score a then record 380 runs – than for the Zimbabwean performance.

Zimbabwe lost its first match against Bangladesh in 2004. In 2004, captain Heath Streak was sacked by the ZCU (now Zimbabwe Cricket), prompting a walkout by 14 other players in protest against political influence in the team's management and selection policies. A scheduled tour by Sri Lanka went ahead, but this was a lopsided affair, with Zimbabwe represented by fringe players who were not of international standard. Because of this, the ZCU accepted that Zimbabwe was to play no further Test cricket in 2004, though its status as a Test nation remained unaffected.

=== 2005–2009: worsening political situation, steep decline and the exodus of players ===
After a series of poor Test performances following the resignation of several senior players, the Zimbabwean team was voluntarily suspended from Test cricket in late 2005 by its cricket board, with ICC encouragement.

In early 2005, Heath Streak was reinstated into the national team, but the political situation in Zimbabwe involving Operation Murambatsvina disrupted the Zimbabwean team. During overseas tours, the players were often said to be buying necessities that were unavailable – or prohibitively expensive – at home, as opposed to the souvenirs which other touring teams would purchase.

In 2005 an agreement was signed which led to the return of many of the rebels to the Zimbabwe team. However, results failed to improve as in March Zimbabwe lost both their Tests on tour against South Africa by an innings. Worse was to follow in August, when they were crushed on home soil by New Zealand, in a match that was completed in just two days. In the process, Zimbabwe was humiliated; they became only the second team in Test history (after India in 1952) to be bowled out twice in the space of one day. Then they lost both their Tests to India at home later in September. After the series against India, Streak announced his retirement from international cricket, dealing yet another blow to the beleaguered team.

By November 2005, the players were once again in dispute with Zimbabwe Cricket over political interference in the management of the game, as well as contract negotiations, and the new captain, Tatenda Taibu, resigned from international cricket. By then the team had been further weakened by the departure of the likes of Dougie Marillier, Craig Wishart and Sean Ervine, all of whom retired in protest and expressed disillusionment in the local cricket hierarchy.

By January 2006, 37 Zimbabwean cricketers had failed to receive any offer of renegotiation talks from Zimbabwe Cricket after their contracts with the board had expired. This body of players demanded that the chairman and managing director of Zimbabwe Cricket, Peter Chingoka and Ozias Bvute, be removed from office for there to be any hope for the players to return to the international stage.

On 6 January 2006, the Sports and Recreation Commission, a division of the Zimbabwean government, took over the offices of Zimbabwe Cricket. The apparent takeover has resulted in the firing of all whites and Asians among the board directors, because of "their racial connotations and saving their own agendas and not government policy" according to Gibson Mashingaidze, an army brigadier and chairman of the government's Sports and Recreation Commission.

An interim board was appointed as the new leading party of cricket in Zimbabwe, with Peter Chingoka appointed as the committee's head. Given Chingoka's close ties to Bvute, it was likely that the latter would continue in his post as well.

On 18 January 2006, Zimbabwe Cricket announced that they were suspending the playing of Test cricket for the rest of the year. Zimbabwe's coach Kevin Curran said that Zimbabwe were aiming to play their next Test against the West Indies in November 2007. It was felt by observers that the Zimbabwean national team was not of sufficient Test standard, and that competing against Full Member teams would do little to improve standards, given the likely one-sided nature of the games. Bangladesh, for a long time seen as the 'whipping boys' of Test cricket, recorded their first win against Zimbabwe, and were thereafter regarded as being of a superior standard. On 8 August 2011, Zimbabwe recorded a resounding victory in the one Test match series over Bangladesh, played in Harare.

Domestically, the Logan Cup – Zimbabwe's first-class competition played amongst the provinces – was canceled in 2006 for the first time since its inception over a century ago (though the Cup was not played during some of the years of the World Wars). This was widely seen due to concern by ZC that the standard of play would be so poor as to be both not worthwhile and potentially harmful to the external image of cricket in Zimbabwe. The one-day trophy, the Faithwear Cup, was contested and drew complaints from observers that the quality was less than club level. As well as player exodus, the main reason for this catastrophic fall in standards was put down to wrangling within Zimbabwe Cricket, where internal politics motivated the removal of the historic provinces and their replacement with revamped, newly designated provincial teams. Zimbabwe's economic collapse led to scanty attendance at games and players not receiving their salaries for long periods of time.

In a further harmful incident, ex-player Mark Vermeulen was arrested after attempting to burn down ZC's offices, and successfully destroying the Zimbabwe Cricket Academy's premises. In a nation in increasing social and economic turmoil, such facilities are hard to replace, and their loss has proven difficult to manage for a cricket administration already short of top-quality facilities.

In the period leading up to the 2007 Cricket World Cup in the West Indies, and to stop a similar exodus of players as after the 2003 World Cup, the selected players were asked to sign a new contract. The players were summoned to meet Ozias Bvute, Zimbabwe Cricket's managing director, a week or so before they were due to set off and given an ultimatum – sign the contract on offer or be removed from the squad. It is understood that they were not allowed to take advice, and were told they had to make the decision then and there.

One player told his teammates that there were certain things contained in the contracts that needed clarification. He was summoned back into Bvute's office and warned that it was a take-it-or-leave-it offer: this player was later revealed to be Anthony Ireland. Another said that when he told Bvute he wanted to consult with friends, Bvute picked up the phone and called Kenyon Ziehl, the head of selection, and told him he wanted the player replaced in the squad. Unsurprisingly, the player backed down and signed.

In light of the poor state of Zimbabwe's finances, and that Zimbabwe Cricket had to borrow around US$1 million in early 2007 pending receipt of monies from the World Cup to help them over an ongoing cash crisis, the board agreed to pay match fees in US dollars. The players were to be paid US$2000 per appearance and a series of US$500 bonuses based on wickets taken and fifties scored. The maximum payment was believed to be capped at around US$8000. However, fees were not paid until June 2007 to stop the exodus and help cash flow.

The specter of continued problems with the ZC board influenced some players to cut their losses and seek to finish their careers abroad: Anthony Ireland accepted a contract to play for Gloucestershire during 2007, while opener Vusi Sibanda also left. More are thought to be considering following suit.

Zimbabwe fared poorly in the 2007 Cricket World Cup, even failing to beat non-Test playing Ireland.

Zimbabwe upset Australia in its opening match of the Twenty20 World Championship in Cape Town, defeating them by 5 wickets. Brendan Taylor led the way for Zimbabwe, with first-class wicket keeping (a catch, stumping, and run out) and a crucial unbeaten 60 from 45 deliveries. He was announced as Man of the Match. They then lost to England by 50 runs, meaning they exited the tournament at the first stage due to their net run rate being inferior to both Australia and England after Australia had beaten England in the other group match.

There was more encouraging news in October 2007, when it was announced that Zimbabwe would compete in all three domestic competitions in South Africa as part of Cricket South Africa's attempts to improve the standard of cricket in Zimbabwe.

However, their participation in the above competitions was thrown into doubt when the plans were postponed pending a Cricket South Africa board meeting. A compromise was reached late in November 2007, meaning Zimbabwe would have taken part in the MTN Domestic Championship and the Standard Bank Pro 20 Series, but not the SuperSport Series as originally planned. Instead, they played three first-class four-day games against a South African Composite XI made up of franchise and provincial players. The three games, in Paarl, Potchefstroom, and Kimberley were all won by Zimbabwe.

In between those games, they played a five match One Day International series against the West Indies, scoring an upset win in the opening match before losing the series 3–1. The final match was abandoned due to rain.

Zimbabwe's performance against Bangladesh during this time was extremely poor as they lost every ODI series except one at home, including a 0–5 whitewash in 2006.

Zimbabwe also lost against non-Test playing nation Kenya very often. But in 2009, they bounced back beating their African neighbors 9–1 in ten games.

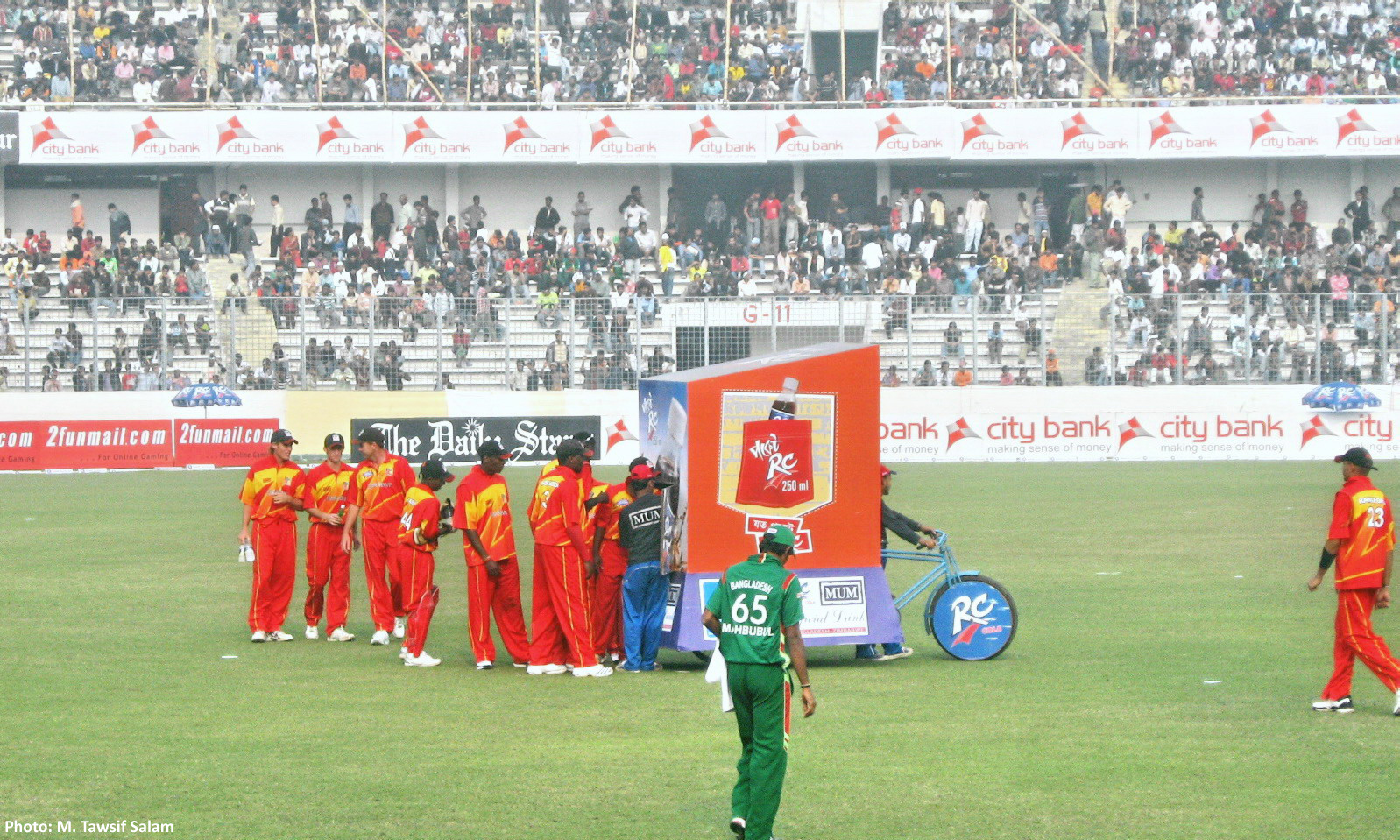
Zimbabwean players take the drinks break in their ODI match against Bangladesh at Sher-e-Bangla Cricket Stadium, Dhaka on 23 January 2009.

=== 2010–2013: return to Tests and continued financial problems ===
Zimbabwe won an ODI and a T20I during their tour of the West Indies. Zimbabwe reached the finals of a triangular tournament that included India and Sri Lanka. They lost their remaining matches in the year except against Ireland whom they beat 2–1 at home.

Zimbabwe started their World Cup 2011 campaign with a 91-run defeat by Australia at Ahmadabad on 21 February 2011. They then recorded a comfortable victory over Canada, before losing by 10 wickets to New Zealand on 4 March 2011. Further heavy defeats by Sri Lanka and Pakistan followed, before a consolation victory over Kenya was achieved in Zimbabwe's final game of the tournament. After these defeats, opening batsman Brendan Taylor was announced as captain of all formats on 24 June 2011, replacing Elton Chigumbura.

Zimbabwe returned to Test cricket on 4 August 2011 after a six-year exile, hosting Bangladesh in a one-off Test match at Harare. The national team's re-introduction to Test cricket was successful, as they won by 130 runs.

As part of the lead-up to their Test return, Zimbabwe Cricket announced major upgrades to the Harare Sports Club and Mutare Sports Club grounds. Plans for a new Test ground at Victoria Falls were also revealed. ZC also signed a US$1 million deal with Reebok to sponsor the domestic competitions and manufacture the kits of the national team for three years.

Following the Test, Zimbabwe and Bangladesh contested a five-match ODI series. Zimbabwe won 3–2, thus recording their first ODI series win against a Test-playing nation since 2006.

Zimbabwe was beaten in all the formats by Pakistan. After this they played a home series with New Zealand. They were defeated 2–0 in the T20I series, and New Zealand was 2–0 up in the ODI series. The final ODI was being played at the Queen's Sports Club, Bulawayo. They were on a 12-match losing streak at that time.

Furthermore, when batting first, New Zealand scored 328 in 50 overs, nobody gave Zimbabwe a chance of winning. The Zimbabweans have never chased an ODI total over 300 before. However, they did it successfully for the first time in their history.

Zimbabwe's main aim in the innings break was to lose with dignity. When opener Vusi Sibanda was out for a duck, even that seemed to be a tall order, but skipper Brendan Taylor changed the entire complexion of the match. Taylor scored a brilliant 75 before he was dismissed fresh from the centuries he scored from the last games.

After Taylor's dismissal, Tatenda Taibu's speedy fifty kept Zimbabwe in the hunt. However, the match-changing partnership was between the two all-rounders Malcolm Waller and Elton Chigumbura. Waller played one of the greatest innings in ODI history as he scored 99*. In the end, he even did not think of his century, but to just take his team over the line. His unselfishness brought about for Zimbabwe a much-needed victory. His partner Chigumbura scored a brisk 47 and was quite unlucky to miss out on his half-century, bowled by Jacob Oram after he along with Waller had taken the equation below a run a ball. When Keegan Meth was bowled two balls later for a duck, Waller kept his cool as he marshaled the middle order efficiently, assisted by a six by debutant Natsai Mushangwe, and then enough support by Ray Price brought the scores level. After Price was dismissed (caught), it was the last wicket Zimbabwe had and the new man in was another debutant Njabulo Ncube. Waller is said to have advised him, "'No matter what happens if I get bat on the ball, let's take the run.' And the run they did take, thereby recording a legendary victory for Zimbabwe. According to an interview later, Waller said that he was thinking of a swing and get the ball over the ground so that both his team could win and he could get a century, but later he thought that he would rather take the team home rather than get 100,". Waller was the Man of the Match for his spectacular performance, while Brendan Taylor was Man of the Series.

Zimbabwe came close to winning the solitary Test between the teams. Chasing 366 to win in their second innings, Zimbabwe were well placed at 265 for 3, with Taylor making 117, before a collapse handed New Zealand a 34-run victory.

Zimbabwe then toured New Zealand in January and February 2012 for a single-Test, three-ODI and two-T20I series, but lost all six matches. In the Test, they were bowled out twice on the third day – for 51 (their lowest Test score) and 143 – to lose by an innings and 301 runs.

In June 2012, Zimbabwe beat South Africa in a t20 match of an unofficial triangular T20 tournament where Bangladesh national cricket team also featured. This was the 3rd match of the tournament. They beat South Africa by 29 runs. They also had beaten Bangladesh in the first match of that tournament by 10 runs. In the 3rd match against South Africa, although there were no AB de Villiers and Jacques Kallis, the South Africa team was very much strong. Winning the toss and electing to bat first, Vusi Sibanda and Hamilton Masakadza opened the innings and scored 58 and 55 respectively. The wicket-keeper captain Brendan Taylor scored a quickfire 38 from 21 balls in the end. They scored 176/4 in 20 overs. Coming to chase, South African batsmen Richard Levi and Colin Ingram scored 40 and 48 respectively. But the other batsmen struggle to make it and went all out on 147 within 19.2 overs. Christopher Mpofu took 3 for 20. In the next meetings with South Africa and Bangladesh, Zimbabwe lost both of the matches and ended in the same points as those of South Africa and Bangladesh. Due to better net run rates, Zimbabwe and South Africa progressed to the final. On 24 June 2012, in the final match, South Africa batted first and scored 146 runs with the loss of 6 wickets in 20 overs. While an early collapse occurred in their innings, South Africa managed to get back with a fair score as Faf du Plessis scored 66 off 57 balls and Albie Morkel scored a quickfire 34 not out off 23 balls. Kyle Jarvis of Zimbabwe took 2 wickets for 22 runs. coming out to chase, Zimbabwe started well but Vusi Sibanda went out on 24 off 16. But then the captain Brendan Taylor and Hamilton Masakadza well built the innings scoring 59 not out and 58 not out respectively. They took Zimbabwe to victory as they scored 150 for the loss of 1 wicket in 17.1 overs. Zimbabwe won by 9 wickets and clinched the T20 series in front of a full house packed with native Zimbabwean crowd at the Harare Sports Club ground. Brendan Taylor was the man of the match and Hamilton Masakadza got the man of the series award.

Zimbabwe lost all their matches in 2010 and 2012 World t20s in the opening stage.

Zimbabwe toured West Indies again in 2013. This time they were less successful and lost all matches.

Zimbabwe then hosted Bangladesh in June. They won the One Day International series 2–1 while the Test and T20I series were tied 1–1. They then lost an ODI series 0–5 at home to world champions India.

During August and September 2013, Zimbabwe hosted Pakistan in a two-Test, three-ODI and two-T20I series. Pakistan won both T20Is, before coming from behind to win the ODI series 2–1. They then won the first Test following a double-century by Younis Khan in the second innings. However, Zimbabwe won the second Test by 24 runs – their first Test victory against a team other than Bangladesh since 2001 – to draw the series 1–1.

Throughout the period, Zimbabwe's financial condition deeply worsened. The ICC had to step in and provide financial assistance but the usage of monetary benefits has been a question of debate. Zimbabwe players have threatened boycott many times of late and have formed a players' Union. Zimbabwe team has struggled to attract sponsors and this has affected its domestic structure leading to cancellation of many tournaments such as Pro40. A number of franchises also have been cancelled. Multiple tours have been postponed, cancelled or have gone un-televised.

=== 2014–2021: fall in rankings, loss to associates, and failure to reach 2019 World Cup ===
At the 2014 World Twenty20 in Bangladesh, Zimbabwe was eliminated in the group stage. A last-ball defeat against Ireland was followed by victories over the Netherlands (also off the last ball) and the United Arab Emirates, but a resounding win for the Netherlands over Ireland meant that the Dutch progressed to the Super 10 stage on net run-rate.

In July 2014, Zimbabwe hosted Afghanistan in a four-ODI series. They won the first two matches, before the Afghans won the last two to draw the series. The following month, Zimbabwe hosted South Africa in a single-Test and three-ODI series, losing all four matches.

Following the South African tour, Australia arrived in Zimbabwe for a triangular ODI series with the hosts and South Africa. While Zimbabwe lost their first two matches, to Australia and South Africa respectively, they pulled off a significant upset by beating Australia in the 4th match of the series. This was the first time Zimbabwe had beaten Australia in 31 years, with their last win coming in the 1983 world cup in England. Despite this win, Zimbabwe lost their final match and were knocked out of the tournament.

In late 2014, Zimbabwe toured Bangladesh for a three-Test and five-ODI series. They lost all eight matches. Following this, Stephen Mangongo was sacked as coach. In late December 2014, Zimbabwe Cricket appointed Dav Whatmore as coach, replacing Mangongo.

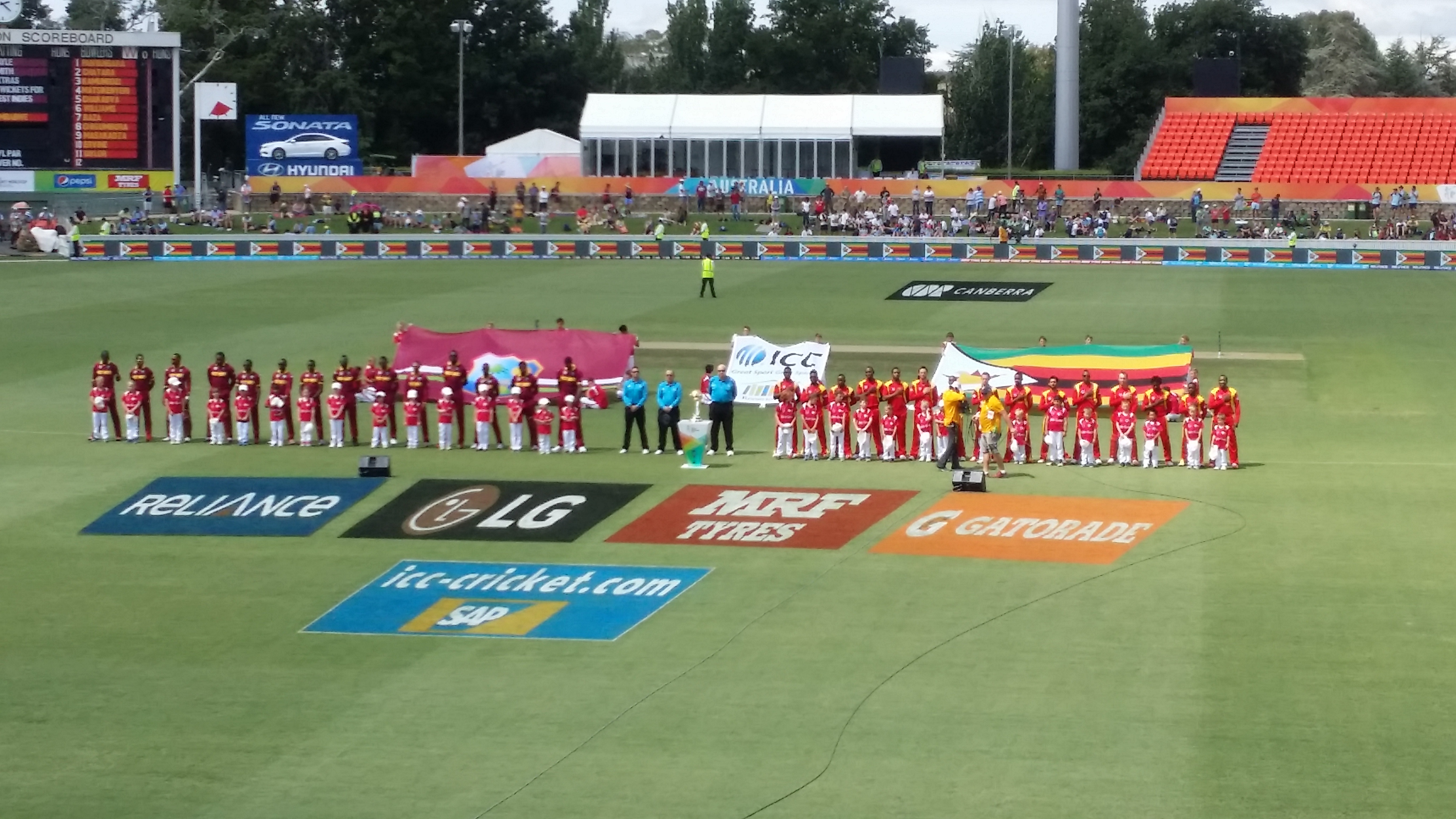
The West Indies' and Zimbabwe's players lining up for their national anthems before their match at the 2015 Cricket World Cup.

Zimbabwe geared up for the 2015 Cricket World Cup by winning all games against Northern Districts XI before facing New Zealand in their first warm-up game. New Zealand were reduced to 157/7 before rain intervened. In the next game, Zimbabwe upset Sri Lanka by seven wickets. Zimbabwe lost their opening game to South Africa, following which they beat the United Arab Emirates before losing to West Indies, with the match being famous for Chris Gayle's 215. Zimbabwe then went on to lose a close encounter to Pakistan.

During the Pool B match between Ireland and Zimbabwe, Sean Williams was caught by Ireland's John Mooney in a close run chase. Mooney was extremely close to the boundary and eight different television replays were inconclusive as to whether his foot had touched the boundary rope. Meanwhile, Williams had walked and the umpires signaled him out. Zimbabwe went on to lose the game and was knocked out of the tournament as a result. In their last game, Zimbabwe lost to India. Zimbabwe finished their world cup campaign with just one win over UAE in the first round. Despite this, Zimbabwe turned out to be very competitive and suffered four of the closest losses in the preliminary round of the tournament.

During the tournament, Brendan Taylor announced his retirement from Zimbabwe cricket even as he finished the tournament with 433 runs and two centuries. At the finish of the tournament, Taylor was among the leading run-getters of the tournament.

In May 2015, Zimbabwe became the first team in six years to tour Pakistan. Zimbabwe lost the T20I series 0–2 and the ODI series by an identical margin. In July that year, Zimbabwe hosted India and lost the ODI series 0–3, while the T20I series was tied 1–1, which included Zimbabwe's first T20I win in Harare.

Zimbabwe then hosted New Zealand in August for a three match ODI series and won the first game but went on to lose the series 1–2, as well as the lone T20I. Pakistan arrived in late September following a decision to postpone their tour. Pakistan won the T20Is 2–0 and the ODI series 2–1.

Following the series against Pakistan, Zimbabwe simultaneously hosted associates Ireland and Afghanistan in October. Zimbabwe beat Ireland 2–1 in ODIs. But, Afghanistan beat Zimbabwe 3–2 to win the ODI series. This was the first time an associate nation had beaten a full member in a bilateral series. Zimbabwe then went on to lose the T20I series 0–2 as well to Afghanistan. After series of losses within home soil, Zimbabwe toured Bangladesh in November. But, losses continued to attack Zimbabweans, where they lost the ODI series 0–3, while the T20Is were drawn 1–1.

At the end of 2015 and the start of 2016, Zimbabwe contested a five-ODI and two-T20I series against Afghanistan in the United Arab Emirates. They took the ODI series to the deciding match before losing 3–2, and lost both T20Is. Zimbabwe then toured Bangladesh for a four-T20I series which was drawn 2–2.

After Chigumbura stepped down as captain, Hamilton Masakadza was named skipper. During the 2016 ICC World Twenty20 in India, Zimbabwe were knocked out in the first round after they lost to Afghanistan by 59 runs.

Zimbabwe axed coach Whatmore and captain Hamilton Masakadza before the India tour in mid-2016. Makhaya Ntini the bowling coach was given interim responsibility of coaching while previously appointed vice-captain Graeme Cremer who had missed the ICC World Twenty20 2016 was appointed stand-in captain. Lance Klusener was appointed batting coach on a full-time basis.

India toured Zimbabwe for the fourth time in about six years for a three ODI and three t20I series. Indian selectors rested most of its senior players except for skipper MS Dhoni who visited the country for the first time in the decade. Zimbabwe was thrashed 0–3 in the ODI series which led to angry reactions by the fans. To add injury to insult, several key Zimbabwe players like Sean Williams, Craig Ervine, Vusi Sibanda, Luke Jongwe, Richmond Mutumbami and Tinashe Panyangara were injured before or during the t20 series. Despite this, Zimbabwe managed to win the first T20I by two runs before going down meekly in the second. The series remained tied 1–1 after two games. In the last game, Zimbabwe went down fighting by 3 runs to lose the series 1–2. In 2016 season, New Zealand toured Zimbabwe in late July and won both tests convincingly, recorded as the Zimbabwe's sixth straight loss to Kiwis.

Before the Sri Lanka tour on late September, Streak was appointed as head coach of Zimbabwe, with Ntini appointed as bowling coach. The task was given to qualify for the 2019 ICC Cricket World Cup and go up through the ranks in coming years. Zimbabwe played their 100th Test match on 29 October 2016 against Sri Lanka, but lost the match by 225 runs in the last hour of the fifth day after a fighting innings by skipper Graeme Cremer. Zimbabwe went on to lose the two match series 0–2.

The test series was followed by a tri-series also featuring West Indies. Zimbabwe advanced to the finals with four different results – a loss, a tie, a no-result and a win. However, Zimbabwe lost the final to Sri Lanka by six wickets. In early 2017, Afghanistan again defeated Zimbabwe in the ODI series and won the series 3–2.

Zimbabwe's next one day international series was against Scotland in the European country in mid 2017 which was tied 1–1.

After 15 years, Zimbabwe toured Sri Lanka for 5-ODIs and a single Test in late June 2017. In the first match against Sri Lanka at Galle on 30 June 2017, Zimbabwe recorded their first ODI win against Sri Lanka in Sri Lanka, which is also recorded as their first win in any format against them within Sri Lanka. Solomon Mire scored a match-winning century and Zimbabwe successfully chased 319, which was also recorded as the first successful chase over 300 on Sri Lankan soil.

Despite the opening win, Zimbabwe went on to lose the next two games but bounced back to win the fourth game in a rain-affected match. In the fifth game, Sri Lanka set Zimbabwe a total of 204 runs to chase with Sikandar Raza claiming a career-best 3/21. In reply, Zimbabwe was 137–1 thanks to Hamilton Masakadza's 73 before a collapse saw them lose six wickets before reaching 175. Skipper Cremer joined Raza to score the remaining runs and Zimbabwe won with about 12 overs to spare.

Zimbabwe lost the following one-off test by 4 wickets, partly due to a controversial stumping decision on the fifth day of the test. Despite this, Zimbabwe team and especially coach Heath Streak were showered with praises on their return.

In October, former players Brendan Taylor and Kyle Jarvis returned to the national team after a two-year hiatus to play in the two test match series against the West Indies.

Zimbabwe lost the first match and the two test series 0–1 to West Indies. However, their draw in the second game was their first in over 12 years and they also earned their first points on the ICC rankings table while ending their ten-match losing streak.

Zimbabwe finished the year with an innings defeat within two days against South Africa in a rare four-day test.

Zimbabwe began 2018 with one win (against Sri Lanka) out of four games in a tri-series that involved hosts Bangladesh. They failed to qualify for the finals.

Zimbabwe's next commitment was in the UAE where they again lost 0–2 to Afghanistan in a t20 series. This was followed by yet another ODI series defeat (1–4) against Afghanistan. In March, Zimbabwe hosted nine other teams in the qualifiers for the 2019 Cricket World Cup, the 2018 Cricket World Cup Qualifier, to decide the top two teams that will join the elite eight at cricket's premier event to be held in England and Wales. Zimbabwe were placed in group B alongside Afghanistan, Nepal, Hong Kong and Scotland. Zimbabwe progressed to the super sixes by beating Nepal, Afghanistan and Hong Kong and earning a tie with Scotland. Zimbabwe beat Ireland in the first game of the super sixes but lost the second to West Indies. Needing to win their last game, Zimbabwe suffered a shock loss by 3 runs against UAE and were knocked out of the tournament. This was the first time Zimbabwe had failed to qualify for the Cricket World Cup.

With this failure, Zimbabwe Cricket sacked all the national coaching staff, national captain, under-19 coach and national selector from their positions. During a press conference, ZC suggested that Brendan Taylor would take over leadership of the team. In May 2018, ZC announced the appointment of Lalchand Rajput as interim head coach. In August 2018, he was confirmed as the permanent coach of the team.

In July 2018, Zimbabwe hosted Australia and Pakistan in a T20I tri-series. Zimbabwe players - Brendan Taylor, Graeme Cremer, Sean Williams, Craig Ervine and Sikandar Raza - refused to play after being not paid their salaries for about a year which resulted in a depleted Zimbabwe team losing their games heavily and getting knocked out in the first round. This was followed by a five-ODI series against Pakistan where Zimbabwe - further rattled by the losses of Malcolm Waller, Solomon Mire, and Kyle Jarvis - lost all five games by heavy margins.

Zimbabwe's losing streak in international matches was extended to nineteen as the team lost the ODI series (0–3) and the t20I series (0–2) in South Africa in October and the ODI series (0–3) in Bangladesh in the same month. Zimbabwe put an end to the streak by winning the first test against Bangladesh by 151 runs. This was the Chevrons' first away win since 2001. The series was eventually tied 1-1.

2019 began on a bad note for Zimbabwe with Graeme Cremer putting his career on hold and proposed tours of India and Afghanistan being called off. Zimbabwe retained Hamilton Masakadza as skipper for all formats (despite the cricketer having not won a single limited overs match) while Peter Moor was named deputy. However, Masakadza along with Taylor missed the series against UAE due to injury. Moor captained the team in Masakadza's absence. Under Moor, Zimbabwe recorded their first series clean sweep in over a decade by beating UAE 4–0.

Masakadza returned along with Taylor for Zimbabwe's tour to the Netherlands. Zimbabwe lost the ODI series 0–2. After the Netherlands won the first t20i, the second game ended in a dramatic tie. Zimbabwe won the super over to tie the series 1-1. During the tour, Zimbabwe's cricket board was suspended and was replaced by an interim board. Zimbabwe also lost the ODI series 0–3 in the subsequent tour of Ireland. The t20I series was tied 1-1.

ICC voluntarily suspended the Zimbabwe Cricket on 18 July 2019 from ICC tournaments citing political interventions in the Cricket Board of Zimbabwe. The decision taken by ICC panel left several players frustrated. Due to the ban, Zimbabwe could not compete in the qualifiers for 2020 ICC World Twenty20. Zimbabwe's board was reinstated by their government soon after, but the suspension stayed. During the time, Solomon Mire and captain Hamilton Masakadza (under whom Zimbabwe had lost all 25 completed ODIs) announced their retirements.

Despite the suspension by the ICC, Zimbabwe Cricket confirmed that they would still be participating in the 2019–20 Bangladesh Tri-Nation Series, as they can still play against other ICC members. The tri-series started on 13 September, with the final scheduled to be held on 24 September. Masakadza's last assignment led to Zimbabwe winning one game out of four and bowing out of the tournament.

Under new stand-in captain Sean Williams and missing many of their regular players, Zimbabwe toured Singapore to play in a final Tri-Nation Series also involving Nepal. Zimbabwe beat Nepal in the first game but lost to 21st ranked Singapore in the second. Zimbabwe won the next two games to register their first-ever series win in t20i format. In October 2019, the ICC lifted its suspension on Zimbabwe Cricket, allowing them to take part in future ICC events.

Zimbabwe's first commitment of the year 2020 was a two-test home series against Sri Lanka which they lost 0–1. This was followed by a lone test and ODI series loss in Bangladesh. They lost the lone test in Sylhet by an innings and 106 runs. In the first ODI, thanks to a Liton Das century, they lost by a huge margin of 169 runs. The second ODI was a closer affair as Donald Tiripano's incredible assault led to them causing a huge upset, but eventually, Zimbabwe lost by 4 runs. They were crushed by a 292 run partnership by the Bangladeshi openers and went on to lose by 123 runs. After the 0–3 loss, the two teams squared off for a two-game t20i series which Zimbabwe lost 0–2.

As of April 25, 2021 Zimbabwe had played 3 T20i matches against Pakistan marking a remarkable win in second T20 match held at 23 April in Harare restricting opposition to 99/10 against 119 and that was also their first ever victory in T20 against Pakistan.

=== 2022–2023: the redemption, 2022 World Cup qualifier success, first ever win on Australian soil and T20 World Cup ===
In Group A, the United States and Zimbabwe both won their first two matches to secure their places in the semi-finals of the tournament. The Netherlands and Zimbabwe reached the final of the tournament to qualify for the 2022 ICC Men's T20 World Cup. Hosts Zimbabwe beat the Netherlands by 37 runs in the final to win the tournament.

The Bangladesh cricket team toured Zimbabwe in July and August 2022 to play three one-day international (ODI) and three Twenty20 international (T20I) matches.Zimbabwe won the opening T20I match by 17 runs. It was the team's sixth-consecutive win in T20Is, their best in the format. Zimbabwe won the third T20I by 10 runs to win the series by 2–1 margin, which was their first T20I series win against Bangladesh and defeated them in ODI matches too 2–1. Sikandar Raza was player of the series in both the series, Ryan Burl also made a record of 34 runs in an over against Nasum Ahmed bettering shakib al hasan's record of 30 runs an over which dates back in 2019

Although they lost the series 3–0, there was a good fight back against India in 3rd ODI, completely whitewashed by India.

Zimbabwe lost the matches 2–0, but sprung up a surprise to Australians to win the 3rd final ODI . Ryan Burl starred again with his 5/10 being the best bowling by a Zimbabwe player against Australia in ODIs, which incidentally was their first ever win on Australian soil, ending the series 2–1.

Zimbabwe qualified for the Super 12 of the 2022 T20 World Cup after victory over Scotland and Ireland and a loss to the West Indies. The first game of the Super 12 was a no result against neighbours South Africa. The second game brought about a famous one-run win over Pakistan.

=== 2024–present: T20 World Cup success and consistency in playing International Cricket ===
On 23 October 2024, Zimbabwe set a world record for the highest score in a men's T20I with 344 for 4 against The Gambia, during the 2024 ICC Men's T20 World Cup Africa Sub-regional Qualifier B tournament in Kenya. The innings included Sikandar Raza becoming the first Zimbabwe player to score a T20I century, making 133 not out off 43 balls.

In April 2025, Zimbabwe toured Bangladesh for two test matches. They won the first test match in Sylhet by 3 wickets chasing 174. This was their first test victory since their 10-wicket triumph over Afghanistan in Abu Dhabi. It was also their highest successful fourth innings chase in Test cricket.

Zimbabwe soon played England in a one-off test match in Trent Bridge in May 2025. It was their first international match against England since the 2007 T20 World Cup. They eventually lost by an innings and 45 runs.

From 14 to 26 July 2025, Zimbabwe played the 2025 Zimbabwe Tri-Nation Series against South Africa and New Zealand. However, Zimbabwe was largely unsuccessful and lost all four of their matches. New Zealand won the tri-series, beating South Africa by 3 runs in the final.

South Africa toured Zimbabwe for two test matches in June and July 2025 but Zimbabwe was whitewashed 2–0. Zimbabwe had lost the first test match by a mammoth 328 runs. The second test match was famous for Wiaan Mulder's infamous 367 not out, with him declaring at lunch in respect for Brian Lara's record 400 not out. They lost the second test by a mammoth innings and 236 runs.

New Zealand played Zimbabwe in two more test matches in late July to early August but were also swept 2–0, including a crushing defeat by an innings and 359 runs in the second match of the series.

Battered from these large losses, Zimbabwe faced Afghanistan in October for their last test of the year. They had a good match winning by an innings and 73 runs, with Ben Curran scoring his maiden test century and Richard Ngarava taking his maiden five wicket haul. This was their first test win at home since 2013 and their first innings win since 2001. However, they did lose the T20 series 3–0.

Between the 18th and 29 November 2025, Zimbabwe participated in the 2025 Pakistan T20I Tri-Nation Series with Pakistan and Sri Lanka. They won only one out of four games, with that solitary win being a 67-run win against Sri Lanka in Rawalpindi. They were last on the points table.

In the 2026 T20 World Cup, Zimbabwe defeated Australia in a shock upset by 23 runs. This, along with their victory over the latter in the 2007 T20 World Cup, made Zimbabwe the only team in T20 World Cups to have a 100% win rate over Australia.

On February 19, 2026, Zimbabwe stunned Sri Lanka by chasing down a target of 179 with three balls to spare, winning by six wickets in their final group stage match of the ICC Men's T20 World Cup. Brian Bennett scored an unbeaten 63, and Sikandar Raza made 45 to guide Zimbabwe to victory.

Zimbabwe played Bangladesh at home in June 2026. They won the one-off test match by an innings and 85 runs, which was their biggest victory in test cricket. During this tour, Zimbabwe won the first ODI in Harare after successfully defending 141, skittling Bangladesh for 116 and winning by 25 runs. They also won the second ODI in a thrilling win by 13 runs, with Ben Curran scoring 111* and Brad Evans' maiden ODI fifty (58*). This win sealed the series for them regardless of the result in the third ODI. They lost the final match but it didn't affect them as they still won the series 2–1. Despite winning the first T20 during the tour, they eventually lost the series 2-1.

India played in Zimbabwe the following month for 3 T20s. Zimbabwe lost the first T20 after only managing 125/7 in their 20 overs, which India chased with ease, scoring 126/3. They were whitewashed 3-0 after comprehensively losing the next two matches.

Zimbabwe participated in the 2026 Namibia T20I Tri-Nation Series along with South Africa and Namibia, with all matches being at the Namibia Cricket Ground (NCG). They won two matches, both against Namibia, and reached the final against South Africa, losing by 48 runs.

== International grounds ==
Locations of all stadiums which have hosted an international cricket match within Zimbabwe

Venue	City	Capacity	First used	Tests	ODIs	T20Is
Active venues
Harare Sports Club	Harare	10,000	1992	39	157	32
Bulawayo Athletic Club	Bulawayo	12,000	1992	1	4	10
Queens Sports Club	Bulawayo	12,497	1994	23	80	19
Takashinga Cricket Club	Harare		2023	0	9	0
Former venues
Kwekwe Sports Club	Kwekwe	1,400	2002	0	1	0
Old Hararians	Harare	—	2018	0	5	0

== Current squad ==
This is a list of players who have played for Zimbabwe in the past 12 months or have been named in the recent Test, ODI or T20I squad. Uncapped players are listed in italics. Updated on 30 July 2025.

Name	Age	Batting style	Bowling style	Domestic team	Forms	No.	Notes
Batters
Craig Ervine	41	Left-handed	OB	Mashonaland Eagles	Test, ODI	77	
Ben Curran	30	Left-handed	OB	Mid West Rhinos	Test, ODI	57	
Nick Welch	28	Right-handed	LB	Mountaineers	Test, T20I	67	
Innocent Kaia	34	Right-handed	LB	Southern Rocks	Test, T20I	9	
Tinashe Kamunhukamwe	31	Right-handed	OB	Mashonaland Eagles	ODI	22	
Tashinga Musekiwa	26	Right-handed	RM	Mid West Rhinos	T20I	21	
Brian Bennett	23	Right-handed	OB	Mountaineers	Test, T20I	86	Test, ODI (VC)
Takudzwanashe Kaitano	33	Right-handed	OB	Mid West Rhinos	ODI	83	
Dion Myers	24	Right-handed	RFM	Mountaineers	Test, T20I	8	
Prince Masvaure	38	Left-handed	LFM	Mid West Rhinos	Test	56	
All-rounders
Sikandar Raza	40	Right-handed	OB	Southern Rocks	ODI, T20I	24	T20I (C)
Ryan Burl	32	Left-handed	LB	Mid West Rhinos	ODI, T20I	54	T20I (VC)
Milton Shumba	25	Left-handed	SLO	Matabeleland Tuskers	ODI, T20I	3	
Tinotenda Maposa	23	Right-handed	RFM	Matabeleland Tuskers	T20I	66	
Wessly Madhevere	26	Right-handed	OB	Mashonaland Eagles	ODI, T20I	17	
Johnathan Campbell	28	Left-handed	LB	Southern Rocks	Test, T20I	2	
Tony Munyonga	27	Right-handed	OB	Mountaineers	ODI	32	
Wicket-keepers
Brendan Taylor	40	Right-handed	-	Mid West Rhinos	Test, ODI, T20I	1	
Tafadzwa Tsiga	32	Right-handed	-	Southern Rocks	Test	6	
Clive Madande	26	Right-handed	-	Matabeleland Tuskers	Test, ODI, T20I	42	
Joylord Gumbie	30	Right-handed	-	Mountaineers	Test, ODI	44	
Tadiwanashe Marumani	24	Left-handed	OB	Mashonaland Eagles	T20I	49	
Nyasha Mayavo	34	Right-handed	LB	Mashonaland Eagles	T20I	49	
Spin Bowlers
Wellington Masakadza	33	Left-handed	SLO	Mountaineers	Test, ODI, T20I	11	
Vincent Masekesa	29	Right-handed	LB	Mountaineers	Test	18	
Brandon Mavuta	29	Right-handed	LB	Mid West Rhinos	Test, T20I	23	
Graeme Cremer	40	Right-handed	LB	Mid West Rhinos	T20I	30	
Pace Bowlers
Richard Ngarava	28	Left-handed	LFM	Mashonaland Eagles	Test, ODI, T20I	39	Test, ODI (C)
Brad Evans	29	Right-handed	RF	Mashonaland Eagles	ODI	04	
Victor Nyauchi	34	Right-handed	RFM	Mountaineers	Test	61	
Blessing Muzarabani	30	Right-handed	RFM	Southern Rocks	Test, ODI, T20I	40	
Trevor Gwandu	28	Right-handed	RFM	Mid West Rhinos	Test, ODI, T20I		
Tanaka Chivanga	33	Right-handed	RF	Mashonaland Eagles	Test	27	
Luke Jongwe	31	Right-handed	RFM	Matabeleland Tuskers	ODI, T20I	75	
Tendai Chatara	35	Right-handed	RFM	Mountaineers	Test, T20I	13	
Newman Nyamhuri	20	Right-handed	LFM	Mashonaland Eagles	Test, ODI		
Faraz Akram	33	Left-handed	RFM	Mashonaland Eagles	ODI, T20I	35	

== Coaching staff ==
Position	Name
Director of cricket	Dirk Viljeon
Team manager	Lovemore Banda
Head coach	Justin Sammons
Batting coach	Dion Ebrahim
Bowling coach	Charl Langeveldt
Fielding coach	Stuart Matsikenyeri
Strategic performance coach	Rivash Gobind

== Colours ==
In Test cricket, Zimbabwe wears cricket whites with the Zimbabwe Bird insignia on the left side of the chest and the sponsor logo on the right side of the chest. Fielders wear a dark green cap or a white sunhat, also with the Zimbabwe Bird insignia. The helmets worn by the batsmen are coloured similarly.

In ODI and T20 cricket, Zimbabwe wears red kits, usually with yellow accents, or sometimes green or black. Fielders wear a red baseball cap or a red sunhat. The batsman helmet is dark green. In ICC competitions, the sponsor logo is on the left sleeve and the inscription "ZIMBABWE" is on the front of the shirt. Before adopting the primary colour red for uniforms Zimbabwe wore pastel green in limited overs matches, starting with their 1982 series against Sri Lanka.

The current uniforms are manufactured by Vega Sportswear. Previous manufacturers were Reebok (2011–2013), Ihsan Sports (2004–2007), Asics (1999) and International Sports Clothing (1992–1996). PPC Zimbabwe is the current sponsor since 2018. Previous sponsors were Castle Lager (2013–2018), CBZ Limited (2010–2013), Old Mutual Life Assurance (2002–2004) and Zimbabwe Sun.

== Notable players ==
Players are included here because of outstanding achievement or another prominence/notoriety. For a fuller list of Zimbabwean cricketers, see Category: Zimbabwean cricketers.

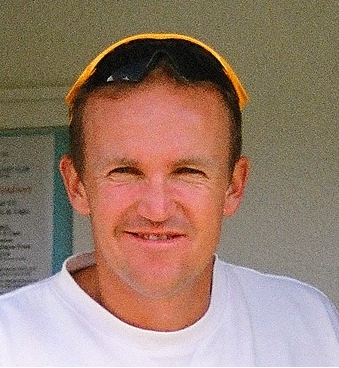
Andy Flower

- Eddo Brandes – Fast bowler; first Zimbabwean to take an ODI hat-trick. Originally a chicken farmer; later became a coach in Australia.
- Alistair Campbell – Former national captain and opening batsman; later an administrator and convener of selectors.
- Kevin Curran – Former all-rounder and Zimbabwe coach (2005–2007). Father of Tom Curran, Ben Curran and Sam Curran.
- Mark Dekker – Former opening bat, the first batsman in Zimbabwe's history to carry his bat through a completed Test innings. Currently second team coach and interim head coach in county cricket for Kent.
- Sean Ervine – elder brother of Craig. Currently plays county cricket for Hampshire.
- Andy Flower – Wicket-keeper batsman, former national captain and black arm-band demonstrator. Once ranked as the top batsman in Test cricket. Coached the England team from 2009 to 2014.
- Grant Flower – Also played county cricket for Leicestershire and Essex, the latter alongside elder brother Andy. Retired from playing in 2010 and became a batting coach, first for Zimbabwe, then Pakistan, and currently for Sri Lanka.
- Duncan Fletcher - Former cricketer, who coached Indian cricket team and England cricket team. He was the coach of the England cricket team from 1999 to 2007 and is credited with the resurgence of the England team in Test cricket in the early 2000s
- Murray Goodwin – Born in Salisbury (now Harare), he began his career with Western Australia in 1994. Played county cricket for Sussex and Glamorgan; retired from playing in 2014 having made 71 first-class hundreds. Currently batting coach for Sussex.
- Graeme Hick – Member of 1983 World Cup squad at the age of 17 and represented Zimbabwe until 1986. Qualified for England and played international cricket from 1991 to 2001. Worcestershire County Cricket Club legend, for whom he compiled 106 of his 136 first-class hundreds.
- David Houghton – Former national captain, has the highest individual Test score for Zimbabwe (266). Later coached Derbyshire; is currently serving as the head coach of Zimbabwe cricket team.
- Kyle Jarvis – Son of Malcolm. Talented fast bowler represented Zimbabwe from 2009 to 2013; signed a Kolpak deal and played for Lancashire before returning to Zimbabwe in September 2017
- Neil Johnson – Born in Salisbury (now Harare). An all-rounder opened both the batting and bowling for his country in the 1999 World Cup. He won three Man-of-the-Match awards and was influential in Zimbabwe's qualification to the Super 6 stage of the tournament.
- Hamilton Masakadza – Talented batsman and former national captain. Made history by scoring a century on his Test debut at the age of 17 in 2001; was also the first black Zimbabwean to score a first-class century, and the first batsman to make two scores of 150 or more in the same ODI series (against Kenya in 2009).
- Pommie Mbangwa – A fast bowler who played in 11 Tests for Zimbabwe, but became one of the world's most famous commentators and recognisable voices in cricket.
- Henry Olonga – Quick bowler, musician, and black arm-band demonstrator. Olonga was the first black Zimbabwean to represent the country in 1995.
- Trevor Penney – Represented Zimbabwe before becoming a Warwickshire County Cricket Club stalwart from 1992 to 2005. Since retirement, his employment as fielding coach (an art in which he excelled) has been much sought-after, currently assisting the Indian national team.
- Ray Price – Spin bowler; one of the few white players to regularly represent Zimbabwe before and after the rebellion of 2004. Also played county cricket for Worcestershire.
- Paul Strang – elder brother of Bryan. Spin bowler and all-rounder, instrumental in Zimbabwe's rise in the mid to late 1990s; current coach of the Auckland Aces.
- Heath Streak – Former national captain and leading wicket-taker for Zimbabwe in both Test and ODI cricket. Later became a bowling coach for both Zimbabwe and Bangladesh.
- Tatenda Taibu – Talented wicket-keeper batsman; became Zimbabwe's first black national captain in 2004 and – at 20 – the youngest Test captain ever, a record he retains as of 2016. Quit cricket for the Church in 2012, but returned to the sport in 2016 as a convener of selectors and development officer.
- Brendan Taylor – Regarded as one of Zimbabwe's few post-isolation international class players, became the first Zimbabwean batsman to hit back-to-back One Day International centuries and the first batsman to score more than 300 runs in a three-match ODI series. He opted for a Kolpak deal with Nottinghamshire after the 2015 World Cup. Returned to Zimbabwe in September 2017.
- Charles Coventry – Coventry jointly held the record for the highest score in ODIs with Saeed Anwar after equaling his 194 versus Bangladesh in 2009 at Bulawayo, until it was surpassed by Sachin Tendulkar's 200* vs South Africa in 2010.
- John Traicos – Born in Egypt of Greek descent, represented South Africa in 1970 before ex-communication. The accurate off-spin bowler who broke records for the longevity of Test career when Zimbabwe debuted in 1992. Popular in quizzes – representing two countries in international but born in neither.
- Prosper Utseya – Spin bowler and former national captain. Second-highest ODI wicket-taker in ODIs and second Zimbabwean to take an ODI hat-trick.
- Guy Whittall – cousin of Andy Whittall. All-rounder and former captain.
- Graeme Cremer – Leg spin bowler and captain. Leading wicket-taker in T20 internationals for Zimbabwe.
- Stuart Carlisle – Middle-order Batsman and former captain. He represented the Zimbabwean national cricket team for 10 years and played 111 ODI and 37 test matches.
- Elton Chigumbura - Fast bowling all-rounder. Has taken over 100 ODI wickets and scored over 4000 ODI runs for Zimbabwe. Captained the team twice periods, first in 2010, then from 2014 till 2016. Also represented the U19 team in 2 world cups. Also, a well-traveled and explosive T20 batsman with a high strike rate
- Gary Ballance - Played for Zimbabwe U19's before representing England from 2013. Captain of Yorkshire CCC. He returned to play for Zimbabwe briefly in 2023.
- Colin de Grandhomme - Represented Zimbabwe U19's in the 2004 World Cup, before moving to New Zealand. He played in the 2019 World Cup Final and represented Kolkata Knight Riders & Royal Challengers Bangalore in the IPL
- Sam Curran - Represented Zimbabwe U13's before moving to England.

== Tournament history ==
=== ICC Men's Cricket World Cup ===
Cricket World Cup record
Year	Round	Position	GP	W	L	T	NR
(England) 1975	Not eligible (not an ICC member)						
(England) 1979	Not eligible (not an ICC member)						
(England) (Wales) 1983	Group stage	8/8	6	1	5	0	0
(India) (Pakistan) 1987	Group stage	8/8	6	0	6	0	0
(Australia) (New Zealand) 1992	Group stage	9/9	8	1	7	0	0
(India) (Pakistan) (Sri Lanka) 1996	Group stage	9/12	6	1	4	0	1
(England) (Wales) (Scotland) (Republic of Ireland) (Netherlands) 1999	Super Sixes	5/12	8	3	4	0	1
(South Africa) (Zimbabwe) (Kenya) 2003	Super Sixes	6/14	9	3	5	0	1
(Cricket West Indies) 2007	Group stage	13/16	3	0	2	1	0
(India) (Sri Lanka) (Bangladesh) 2011	Group stage	10/14	6	2	4	0	0
(Australia) (New Zealand) 2015	Group stage	11/14	6	1	5	0	0
(England) (Wales) 2019	Did not qualify						
(India) 2023	Did not qualify						
(South Africa) (Zimbabwe) (Namibia) 2027	Qualified as co host						
(India) (Bangladesh) 2031	TBD						
Total	0 Titles	9/13	58	12	42	1	3

=== ICC Men's T20 World Cup ===
ICC Men's T20 World Cup record
Year	Round	Position	GP	W	L	T	NR
(South Africa) 2007	Group stage	9/12	2	1	1	0	0
(England) 2009	Withdrew						
(Cricket West Indies) 2010	Group stage	11/12	2	0	2	0	0
(Sri Lanka) 2012	Group stage	12/12	2	0	2	0	0
(Bangladesh) 2014	Group stage	11/16	3	2	1	0	0
(India) 2016	Group stage	11/16	3	2	1	0	0
(United Arab Emirates) (Oman) 2021	Not eligible (suspended)						
(Australia) 2022	Super 12	11/16	8	3	4	1	0
(Cricket West Indies) (United States) 2024	Did not qualify						
(India) (Sri Lanka) 2026	Super 8	8/20	7	3	3	1	0
(Australia) (New Zealand) 2028	Qualified						
(England) (Wales) (Republic of Ireland) (Scotland) 2030	To be determined						
Total	Super 8	8th	27	11	14	2	0

=== ICC Men's Champions Trophy ===
Known as the "ICC KnockOut Trophy" in 1998 and 2000

ICC Champions Trophy record
Year	Round	Position	GP	W	L	T	NR
(Bangladesh) 1998	Pre-quarter-final	9/9	1	0	1	0	0
(Kenya) 2000	Quarter-finals	8/11	1	0	1	0	0
(Sri Lanka) 2002	Pool stage	9/12	2	0	2	0	0
(England) 2004	Group stage	9/12	2	0	2	0	0
(India) 2006	Qualifying round	10/10	3	0	3	0	0
(South Africa) 2009	Did not qualify (outside top 8 in ODI rankings)						
(England) (Wales) 2013	Did not qualify (outside top 8 in ODI rankings)						
(England) (Wales) 2017	Did not qualify (outside top 8 in ODI rankings)						
(Pakistan) (United Arab Emirates) 2025	Did not qualify (outside top 8 in ODI rankings)						
(India) 2029	TBD						
Total	Quarter-finals	8th	9	0	9	0	0

=== T20 World Cup Africa Regional Final ===
T20 World Cup Africa Regional Final record
Year	Round	Position	GP	W	L	T	NR
(Uganda) 2019	Did not participate						
(Rwanda) 2021	Did not participate						
(Namibia) 2023	Round-robin	3/7	6	4	2	0	0
(Zimbabwe) 2025	Winners (Q)	1/8	5	5	0	0	0
Total	2/4	1 Title	11	9	2	0	0

- Q – Qualified for T20 World Cup.

=== ICC Men's Cricket World Cup qualifier ===
Known as the ICC Trophy from 1979 to 2005.

ICC World Cup qualifier record
Year	Round	Position	Matches	Won	Lost	Tied	NR	Win %
(England) 1979	Not eligible (not an ICC member)							
(England) 1982	Champion	1/16	7	5	0	0	2	100.00%
(England) 1986	Champion	1/16	6	6	0	0	0	100.00%
(Netherlands) 1990	Champion	1/17	7	7	0	0	0	100.00%
(Kenya) 1994	Not eligible (ICC full member)							
(Malaysia) 1997	Not eligible (ICC full member)							
(Canada) 2001	Not eligible (ICC full member)							
(Ireland) 2005	Not eligible (ICC full member)							
(South Africa) 2009	Not eligible (ICC full member)							
(New Zealand) 2014	Not eligible (ICC full member)							
(Zimbabwe) 2018	3rd	3/10	9	5	2	1	1	68.75%
(Zimbabwe) 2023	3rd	3/10	9	7	2	0	0	77.78%
Total	Champion (3 times)	1st (3 times)	38	30	4	1	3	87.14%

=== ICC Men's T20 World Cup Global Qualifier ===
ICC T20 World Cup Global Qualifier record
Year	Round	Position	GP	W	L	T	NR
(Botswana) 2019	Suspended by ICC						
(Zimbabwe) 2022	Champions	1/8	5	5	0	0	0
Total	1/2	–	5	5	0	0	0

=== T20 World Cup Africa Sub-regional Qualifier ===
T20 World Cup Africa Sub-regional Qualifier record
Year	Round	Position	GP	W	L	T	NR
(Rwanda) 2021	Did not participate						
(Rwanda) 2022–23	Did not participate						
(Kenya) 2024	Round-robin	1/6	5	5	0	0	0
Total	1/3	–	5	5	0	0	0

=== Men's Commonwealth Games ===
Commonwealth Games record
Year	Round	Position	GP	W	L	T	NR	Win %
(Malaysia) 1998	Group stage	5/16	3	2	1	0	0	66.67%
Total			3	2	1	0	0	66.67%

=== African Games ===
African Games record
Year	Round	Position	GP	W	L	T	NR	Win %
(Ghana) 2023	Champion	1/8	5	5	0	0	0	100.00%
Total	Champion (1 time)	1st (1 time)	5	5	0	0	0	100.00%

== Honours ==
=== Other ===
- African Games
  - Gold medal (1): 2023

== Records ==
International match summary

Playing record
Format	M	W	L	T	D/NR	First match
Test Matches	132	17	84	0	31	18 October 1992
One-Day Internationals	592	157	411	8	16	9 June 1983
Twenty20 Internationals	206	71	130	2	3	28 November 2006

Last updated: 17 November 2026

=== Test matches ===
- Highest team total: 586 v. Afghanistan, 26–30 December 2024 at Bulawayo
- Highest individual score: 266, Dave Houghton v. Sri Lanka, 20–24 October 1994 at Bulawayo
- Most individual runs in a match: 341, Andy Flower (142 and 199 not out) v. South Africa, 7–11 September 2001 at Harare
- Best individual bowling figures in an innings: 8/109, Paul Strang v. New Zealand, 12–16 September 2000 at Bulawayo
- Best individual bowling figures in a match: 11/255, Adam Huckle (6/109 and 5/146) v. New Zealand, 25–29 September 1997 at Bulawayo

Most Test runs

Player	Runs	Average	Career span
Andy Flower	4,794	51.54	1992–2002
Grant Flower	3,457	29.54	1992–2004
Alistair Campbell	2,858	27.21	1992–2002
Brendan Taylor	2,802	38.91	2004–2026
Hamilton Masakadza	2,223	30.04	2001–2018
Guy Whittall	2,207	29.42	1993–2002
Craig Ervine	2,201	36.68	2011–2026
Heath Streak	1,990	22.35	1993–2005
Sean Williams	1,946	45.25	2013–2025
Stuart Carlisle	1,615	26.91	1995–2005

Most Test wickets

Player	Wickets	Average	Career span
Heath Streak	216	28.14	1993–2005
Blessing Muzarabani	80	25.72	2017–2026
Ray Price	80	36.06	1999–2013
Paul Strang	70	36.02	1994–2001
Henry Olonga	68	38.52	1995–2002
Graeme Cremer	64	46.06	2005–2026
Bryan Strang	56	39.33	1995–2001
Andy Blignaut	53	37.05	2001–2005
Guy Whittall	51	40.94	1993–2002
Kyle Jarvis	46	29.43	2011–2020

==== Test record versus other nations ====
Opponent	Matches	Won	Lost	Draw	Tied	% Won	First	Last
Afghanistan	7	3	2	2	0	42.85	2021	2026
Australia	3	0	3	0	0	0.00	1999	2003
Bangladesh	21	9	9	3	0	42.85	2001	2026
England	7	0	4	3	0	0.00	1996	2025
India	11	2	7	2	0	18.18	1992	2005
Ireland	2	0	2	0	0	0.00	2024	2025
New Zealand	19	0	13	6	0	0.00	1992	2025
Pakistan	19	3	12	4	0	15.78	1993	2021
South Africa	11	0	10	1	0	0.00	1995	2025
Sri Lanka	20	0	14	6	0	0.00	1994	2020
West Indies	12	0	8	4	0	0.00	2000	2023
Total	132	17	84	31	0	12.87	1992	2026
Statistics are correct as of Zimbabwe v Bangladesh at Sharjah Cricket Stadium, Sharjah, 13–17 November 2026.

=== One-Day Internationals ===
- Highest team total: 408/6 v. United States, 26 June 2023 at Harare
- Highest individual score: 194*, Charles Coventry v. Bangladesh, 16 August 2009 at Bulawayo
- Best individual bowling figures: 6/19, Henry Olonga v. England, 28 January 2000 at Cape Town

Most ODI runs*

Player	Runs	Average	Career span
Brendan Taylor	6,845	34.92	2004–2026
Andy Flower	6,786	35.34	1992–2003
Grant Flower	6,571	33.52	1992–2010
Hamilton Masakadza	5,658	27.73	2001–2019
Sean Williams	5,217	37.53	2005–2025
Alistair Campbell	5,185	30.50	1992–2003
Sikandar Raza	4,824	37.39	2013–2026
Elton Chigumbura	4,289	25.23	2004–2018
Craig Ervine	3,770	32.78	2010–2026
Tatenda Taibu	3,383	29.41	2001–2012

Most ODI wickets*

Player	Wickets	Average	Career span
Heath Streak	237	29.81	1993–2005
Prosper Utseya	133	46.90	2004–2015
Graeme Cremer	121	30.16	2009–2026
Tendai Chatara	115	32.61	2013–2023
Grant Flower	104	40.62	1992–2010
Sikandar Raza	101	44.00	2013–2026
Ray Price	100	35.75	2002–2012
Paul Strang	96	33.05	1994–2001
Elton Chigumbura	95	42.70	2004–2018
Christopher Mpofu	93	38.50	2004–2020

- Statistics exclude matches played for Africa XI.

==== ODI record versus other nations ====
Opponent	Matches	Won	Lost	Tied	No Result	% Won	First	Last
Full Members
Afghanistan	33	10	22	0	1	31.25	2014	2026
Australia	36	3	32	0	1	8.57	1983	2026
Bangladesh	85	33	52	0	0	38.82	1997	2026
England	30	8	21	0	1	27.58	1992	2004
India	66	10	54	2	0	16.66	1983	2022
Ireland	25	10	11	1	3	47.72	2007	2025
New Zealand	38	9	27	1	1	25.67	1987	2015
Pakistan	65	5	56	2	2	9.52	1992	2024
South Africa	41	2	38	0	1	5.00	1992	2018
Sri Lanka	66	12	51	0	3	19.04	1992	2025
West Indies	49	11	36	1	1	23.95	1983	2023
Associate Members
Bermuda	2	2	0	0	0	100	2006	2006
Canada	2	2	0	0	0	100	2006	2011
Hong Kong	1	1	0	0	0	100	2018	2018
Kenya	32	25	5	0	2	83.33	1996	2011
Namibia	1	1	0	0	0	100	2018	2018
Nepal	1	1	0	0	0	100	2023	2023
Netherlands	7	4	3	0	0	50.00	2003	2023
Oman	1	1	0	0	0	100	2023	2023
Scotland	4	1	2	1	0	37.5	2017	2023
United Arab Emirates	6	5	1	0	0	83.33	2015	2019
United States	1	1	0	0	0	100	2023	2023
Total	592	157	411	8	16	28.03	1982	2026
Statistics are correct as of Zimbabwe v Afghanistan at Sharjah Cricket Stadium, Sharjah, 23 October 2026.

=== Twenty20 Internationals ===
- Highest team total: 344/4 v. Gambia, 23 October 2024 at Ruaraka Sports Club Ground, Nairobi.
- Highest individual score: 133*, Sikandar Raza v. Gambia, 23 October 2024 at Ruaraka Sports Club Ground, Nairobi.
- Best individual bowling figures: 5/18, Sikandar Raza v. Rwanda, 22 October 2024 at Ruaraka Sports Club Ground, Nairobi.

Most T20I runs

Player	Runs	Average	Career span
Sikandar Raza	3,369	26.11	2013–2026
Ryan Burl	2,265	26.03	2018–2026
Brian Bennett	2,166	32.81	2023–2026
Sean Williams	1,805	23.75	2011–2025
Hamilton Masakadza	1,662	26.00	2006–2019

Most T20I wickets

Player	Wickets	Average	Career span
Richard Ngarava	124	20.79	2019–2026
Blessing Muzarabani	118	21.91	2018–2026
Sikandar Raza	116	25.41	2013–2026
Brad Evans	67	19.16	2022–2026
Luke Jongwe	66	22.25	2015–2024

==== T20I record versus other nations ====
Opponent	Matches	Won	Lost	Tied	No result	% Won	First	Last
Full Members
Afghanistan	24	2	22	0	0	8.33	2015	2026
Australia	4	2	2	0	0	50.00	2007	2026
Bangladesh	28	9	19	0	0	32.14	2006	2026
England	1	0	1	0	0	0.00	2007	2007
India	17	3	14	0	0	17.64	2010	2026
Ireland	18	8	8	0	2	50.00	2014	2025
New Zealand	8	0	8	0	0	0.00	2010	2025
Pakistan	23	3	20	0	0	13.04	2008	2025
South Africa	12	0	11	0	1	0.00	2010	2026
Sri Lanka	12	4	8	0	0	33.33	2008	2026
West Indies	5	1	4	0	0	20.00	2010	2026
Associate Members
Botswana	1	1	0	0	0	100.00	2025	2025
Canada	2	1	0	1	0	75.00	2008	2008
Gambia	1	1	0	0	0	100.00	2024	2024
Hong Kong	1	1	0	0	0	100	2016	2016
Jersey	1	1	0	0	0	100	2022	2022
Kenya	3	3	0	0	0	100	2023	2025
Mozambique	1	1	0	0	0	100	2024	2024
Namibia	17	9	8	0	0	52.94	2022	2026
Nepal	2	2	0	0	0	100	2019	2019
Netherlands	5	2	2	1	0	50.00	2014	2022
Nigeria	1	1	0	0	0	100	2023	2023
Oman	1	1	0	0	0	100	2026	2026
Papua New Guinea	1	1	0	0	0	100	2022	2022
Rwanda	2	2	0	0	0	100	2023	2024
Scotland	5	4	1	0	0	80.00	2016	2022
Seychelles	1	1	0	0	0	100	2024	2024
Singapore	3	2	1	0	0	66.66	2019	2022
Tanzania	2	2	0	0	0	100	2023	2025
Uganda	2	1	1	0	0	0	2023	2025
United Arab Emirates	1	1	0	0	0	100	2014	2014
United States	1	1	0	0	0	100	2022	2022
Total	206	71	130	2	3	35.46	2006	2026
Statistics are correct as of Zimbabwe v Afghanistan at Sharjah Cricket Stadium, Sharjah; 1 November 2026.

== See also ==
- Cricket in Zimbabwe
- Sport in Zimbabwe – Overview of sports in Zimbabwe
- List of Zimbabwe Test cricketers
- List of Zimbabwe ODI cricketers
- List of Zimbabwe Twenty20 international cricketers
- Zimbabwean women's cricket team

== Notes ==
Preceded by Sri Lanka	Test match playing teams 18 October 1992	Succeeded by Bangladesh
