= Nick Welch (cricketer) =

Zimbabwean cricketer (born 1998)

Personal information
- Full name: Nicholas Roy Welch
- Born: 5 February 1998 (age 28); Harare, Zimbabwe
- Batting: Right-handed
- Bowling: Right-arm leg break
- Role: Batsman

International information
- National side: Zimbabwe (2023–present)
- Test debut (cap 135): 6 February 2025 v Ireland
- Last Test: 7 August 2025 v New Zealand
- T20I debut (cap 73): 24 October 2023 v Namibia
- Last T20I: 29 November 2023 v Nigeria

Domestic team information
- Years: Team
- 2013/14–2023/24: Mashonaland Eagles
- 2019: Loughborough MCCU
- 2020–2023: Leicestershire (squad no. 67)
- 2024/25–: Mountaineers

Career statistics
Competition	Test	T20I	FC	LA
Matches	7	7	37	37
Runs scored	319	97	1,819	1,200
Batting average	24.53	13.85	30.31	34.28
100s/50s	0/3	0/0	4/8	2/10
Top score	90	25	159	127*
Catches/stumpings	6/–	0/–	24/–	14/–
- Source: Cricinfo, 9 August 2025

Nicholas Roy Welch (born 5 February 1998) is a Zimbabwean cricketer who has played for Mashonaland Eagles and Mountaineers in Zimbabwe. After playing domestic cricket in Zimbabwe and representing Zimbabwe at Under-13 and Under-17 levels, he moved to England, signing to play for Leicestershire County Cricket Club in September 2020. In the same month, he also gained UK citizenship. He had been in England for five years by then. According to Leicestershire head coach Paul Nixon, he had improved his game by watching the likes of Adam Lyth and Alex Hales.

In March 2019, he played for Loughborough MCCU in a first-class match against Leicestershire, as part of the Marylebone Cricket Club University fixtures. He made his Twenty20 debut on 13 September 2020, for Leicestershire in the 2020 t20 Blast. He had signed a contract extension with Leicestershire in 2022, before leaving the county in 2023. He represented Harare Kings and Uprising in Zimbabwe's National Premier League in 2020 and played for Durban Qalandars who won the inaugural Zim Afro T10 in 2023.

On 24 October 2023, he made his debut in international cricket for Zimbabwe against Namibia in a T20 match at Windhoek, where he was dismissed by the first ball of the match. Playing for Mountaineers in the Logan Cup in 2024–25, he scored a century in each match in the first three rounds: 125 and 16, 151 and 22, 18 and 159. He then had a 100% conversion rate from fifties to hundreds.
