= Five-wicket haul =

Cricket terminology

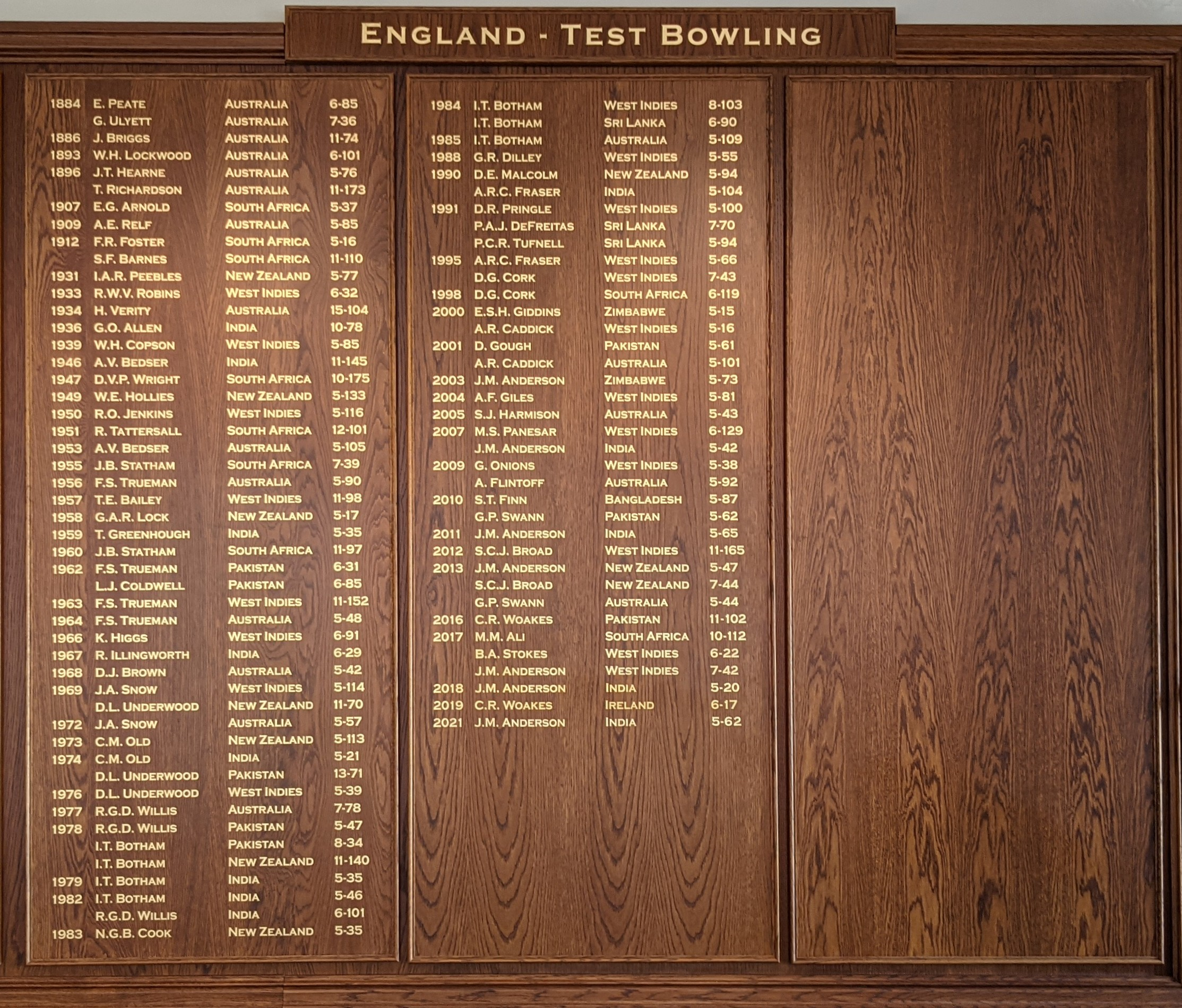
The Lord's honours board commemorating English five- or ten-wicket hauls at Lord's.

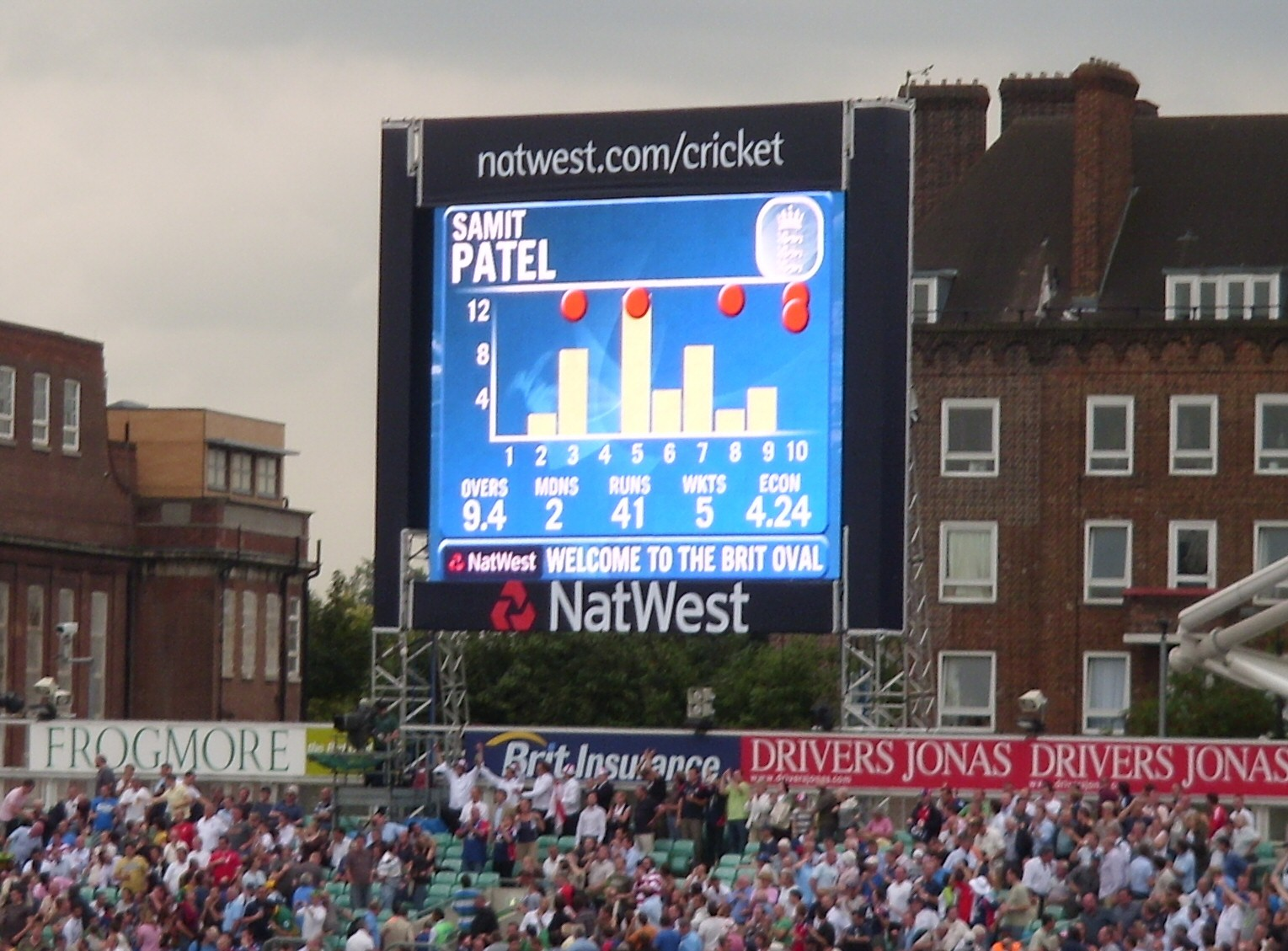
Scoreboard summarising Samit Patel's 5-wicket haul. The bar chart shows the runs conceded (white rectangles) and wickets taken (red dots) in each over.

In cricket, a five-wicket haul (also known as a "five–for" or "fifer") occurs when a bowler takes five or more wickets in a single innings, commonly abbreviated as 5wI. Taking five wickets is regarded as a notable achievement, equivalent to a century by a batter. In 2001, Glenn McGrath invented the tradition of a bowler raising the ball to the crowd at the completion of a five-wicket haul.

Taking a five-wicket haul at Lord's earns the bowler a place on the Lord's honours boards.

== Records ==
As of 2025, only thirteen cricketers have taken a five-wicket haul in all three international formats of the game (Test cricket, One Day International and Twenty20 International): Sri Lanka's Ajantha Mendis and Lasith Malinga, India's Bhuvneshwar Kumar, and Kuldeep Yadav, New Zealand's Tim Southee, South Africa's Imran Tahir and Lungi Ngidi, West Indies' Jason Holder and Alzarri Joseph, Bangladesh's Shakib Al Hasan, Pakistan's Umar Gul and Hasan Ali, and Afghanistan's Rashid Khan.

In 2018, Afghan cricketer Mujeeb Zadran, aged 16, became the youngest bowler to take a five-wicket haul in an ODI. In 2019, Pakistani cricketer Naseem Shah, also aged 16, became the youngest bowler to take a five-wicket haul in a Test match. Afghan cricketer Rashid Khan is the youngest bowler to take a five-wicket haul in a T20 international match; he was 18 at the time.

Sri Lankan Muttiah Muralitharan has taken the most five-wicket hauls in Test matches with 67, and Pakistani Waqar Younis has taken the most five-wicket hauls in ODIs with 13. The record for most five-wicket hauls in T20Is is 4, which has been achieved by Bahraini cricketer Rizwan Butt.

== See also ==
- List of cricketers with five-wicket hauls in all international formats
- List of cricketers who have taken five-wicket hauls on Test debut
- List of cricketers who have taken two five-wicket hauls on Test debut
- Category:Lists of international cricket five-wicket hauls
- Ten-wicket haul
