= 2013–14 Pro50 Championship =

- Dates: 7 December 2013 – 30 April 2014
- Administrator: Zimbabwe Cricket
- Cricket format: List A cricket
- Tournament format: Round-robin + Final
- Champions: Mountaineers (2nd title)
- Participants: 5
- Matches: 21
- Most runs: Hamilton Masakadza (260)
- Most wickets: Donald Tiripano (13); Tawanda Mupariwa (13)

The 2013–14 Pro50 Championship was the twelfth edition of the Pro50 Championship, a List A cricket tournament in Zimbabwe. The competition began on 7 December 2013 and the final was played on 30 April 2014.

Mountaineers won the tournament for the second time, defeating the Southern Rocks in the final by 7 wickets.

Mountaineers batsman Hamilton Masakadza was the tournament's leading run-scorer with a total of 260 runs. Donald Tiripano of the Mountaineers and Tawanda Mupariwa of the Matabeleland Tuskers were the leading wicket-tackers with a total of 13 wickets each.

== Points table ==
| Pos | Team | Pld | W | L | T | NR | BP | Pts | NRR |
|---|---|---|---|---|---|---|---|---|---|
| 1 | Mountaineers | 8 | 4 | 3 | 0 | 1 | 3 | 21 | 1.353 |
| 2 | Southern Rocks | 8 | 4 | 3 | 0 | 1 | 1 | 19 | −0.179 |
| 3 | Mashonaland Eagles | 8 | 4 | 4 | 0 | 0 | 2 | 18 | 0.233 |
| 4 | Matabeleland Tuskers | 8 | 4 | 4 | 0 | 0 | 0 | 16 | −0.260 |
| 5 | Mid West Rhinos | 8 | 3 | 5 | 0 | 0 | 1 | 13 | −0.649 |

Qualified for the final

== Fixtures ==
=== Round-robin ===
7 December 2013
Scorecard

| Mid West Rhinos; 118 (43 overs) | v | Mashonaland Eagles; 119/7 (42 overs) |
| Neville Madziva 33* (66); Admire Manyumwa 3/16 (8 overs) | | Chamu Chibhabha 43 (110); Kudakwashe Munyede 2/16 (10 overs) |

Mashonaland Eagles won by 3 wickets
Harare Sports Club, Harare
Umpires: Sifelani Rwaziyeni and Langton Rusere

- Mashonaland Eagles won the toss and elected to field.
- Ronnie Chokununga, Kudakwashe Munyede, Mkhululi Nyathi (Mid West Rhinos) and Joylord Gumbie (Mashonaland Eagles) made their List A debuts.

7 December 2013
Scorecard

| Southern Rocks; 140 (39.1 overs) | v | Matabeleland Tuskers; 129 (47.3 overs) |
| Richmond Mutumbami 45 (62); Christopher Mpofu 4/32 (8 overs) | | Bradley Staddon 24 (49); Roy Kaia 3/13 (5.3 overs) |

Southern Rocks won by 11 runs
Masvingo Sports Club, Masvingo
Umpires: Trevor Phiri and Iknow Chabi

- Matabeleland Tuskers won the toss and elected to field.
- Luke Jongwe (Southern Rocks) and Tonny Mupariwa (Matabeleland Tuskers) made their List A debuts.

15 December 2013
Scorecard

| Southern Rocks; 244/9 (50 overs) | v | Mid West Rhinos; 55 (23.5 overs) |
| Richmond Mutumbami 80 (73); Bright Njanji 4/46 (7 overs) | | Ronnie Chokununga 17 (58); Bright Njanji 17 (30); Tafadzwa Kamungozi 6/13 (6.5 overs) |

Southern Rocks won by 189 runs
Kwekwe Sports Club, Kwekwe
Umpires: Stanley Gogwe and Russell Tiffin

- Southern Rocks won the toss and elected to bat.
- Washington Nzira, Bright Njanji, Tafadzwa Potsekai, Reason Deka, Paddington Mhondoro, Romeo Madziva, Tafara Chingwara (Mid West Rhinos) and Innocent Kaia (Southern Rocks) made their List A debuts.

15 December 2013
Scorecard

| Mountaineers | v | Mashonaland Eagles |

Mashonaland Eagles won (walkover without a ball bowled)
Mutare Sports Club, Mutare
Umpires: Iknow Chabi and Jeremiah Matibiri

- No toss.

22 February 2014
Scorecard

| Matabeleland Tuskers; 227/9 (50 overs) | v | Mountaineers; 217 (48.4 overs) |
| Sean Williams 39 (36); Tendai Chatara 3/18 (9 overs) | | Dan Housego 91 (96); Sean Williams 4/34 (8.4 overs) |

Matabeleland Tuskers won by 10 runs
Queens Sports Club, Bulawayo
Umpires: Lucky Ngwenya and Christopher Phiri

- Mountaineers won the toss and elected to field.

22 February 2014
Scorecard

| Southern Rocks; 245 (47.1 overs) | v | Mashonaland Eagles; 240 (47.5 overs) |
| Richmond Mutumbami 69 (76); Nathan Waller 5/63 (9.1 overs) | | Elton Chigumbura 66 (95); Tinashe Panyangara 4/50 (9.5 overs) |

Southern Rocks won by 5 runs
Masvingo Sports Club, Masvingo
Umpires: Owen Chirombe and Langton Rusere

- Southern Rocks won the toss and elected to bat.

2 March 2014
Scorecard

| Matabeleland Tuskers; 186/9 (50 overs) | v | Mid West Rhinos; 187/1 (43 overs) |
| Godwill Mamhiyo 50 (74); Michael Chinouya 3/45 (10 overs) | | Peter Moor 104* (119); Tawanda Mupariwa 1/39 (9 overs) |

Mid West Rhinos won by 9 wickets
Kwekwe Sports Club, Kwekwe
Umpires: Stanley Gogwe and Owen Chirombe

- Mid West Rhinos won the toss and elected to field.
- Dalubhle Mboyi (Matabeleland Tuskers) and Carl Mumba (Mid West Rhinos) made their List A debuts.

2 March 2014
Scorecard

| Southern Rocks; 176 (43.4 overs) | v | Mountaineers; 24/3 (11.4 overs) |
| Tendai Chisoro 31 (32); Tatenda Mupunga 4/27 (5 overs) | | Tino Mawoyo 12* (33); Roy Kaia 2/13 (5.4 overs) |

No result
Masvingo Sports Club, Masvingo
Umpires: Russell Tiffin and Lucky Ngwenya

- Southern Rocks won the toss and elected to bat.
- Tafadzwa Tsiga, Tendai Maruma (Southern Rocks), Tatenda Saurombe and Wellington Masakadza (Mountaineers) made their List A debuts

15 March 2014
Scorecard

| Mashonaland Eagles; 188 (47.4 overs) | v | Matabeleland Tuskers; 189/6 (46 overs) |
| Nathan Waller 55 (90); Thabo Mboyi 5/39 (9.4 overs) | | Brian Chari 89* (113); Chamu Chibhabha 2/19 (6 overs) |

Matabeleland Tuskers won by 4 wickets
Queens Sports Club, Bulawayo
Umpires: Trevor Phiri and Langton Rusere

- Matabeleland Tuskers won the toss and elected to field.
- Nick Welch, Victor Nyauchi (Mashonaland Eagles), Bruce Sibanda and Kevin Kandala (Matabeleland Tuskers) made their List A debuts.

15 March 2014
Scorecard

| Mountaineers; 203 (46 overs) | v | Mid West Rhinos; 206/6 (48 overs) |
| Tino Mawoyo 67 (94); Carl Mumba 4/31 (10 overs) | | Bothwell Chapungu 67 (70); Tatenda Mupungu 4/34 (10 overs) |

Mid West Rhinos won by 4 wickets
Mutare Sports Club, Mutare
Umpires: Sifelani Rwaziyeni and Iknow Chabi

- Mid West Rhinos won the toss and elected to field.
- Tarisai Musakanda (Mid West Rhinos) made his List A debut.

23 March 2014
Scorecard

| Southern Rocks; 216 (48.4 overs) | v | Matabeleland Tuskers; 183 (44.4 overs) |
| Luke Jongwe 45 (40); Keith Dabengwa 4/57 (10 overs) | | Godwill Mamhiyo 70* (86); Prince Masvaure 2/12 (6 overs) |

Southern Rocks won by 33 runs
Queens Sports Club, Bulawayo
Umpires: Lucky Ngwenya and Christopher Phiri

- Southern Rocks won the toss and elected to bat.
- Charles Kunje (Southern Rocks) made his List A debut.

23 March 2014
Scorecard

| Mid West Rhinos; 88 (31 overs) | v | Mashonaland Eagles; 89/7 (24.4 overs) |
| Bradley Wadlan 28 (51); Tafadzwa Muzarawetu 5/17 (9 overs) | | Chamu Chibhabha 17 (21); Kudakwashe Bhasikoro 5/17 (10 overs) |

Mashonaland Eagles won by 3 wickets
Kwekwe Sports Club, Kwekwe
Umpires: Stanley Gogwe and Jeremiah Matibiri

- Mashonaland Eagles won the toss and elected to field.
- Kudakwashe Bhasikoro (Mid West Rhinos) and Tafadzwa Muzarawetu (Mashonaland Eagles) made their List A debuts.

28 March 2014
Scorecard

| Mashonaland Eagles; 107 (37.5 overs) | v | Mountaineers; 110/3 (16.3 overs) |
| Regis Chakabva 16 (41); Donald Tiripano 3/11 (6.5 overs) | | Kevin Kasuza 46 (41); Tinotenda Mutombodzi 1/14 (2.3 overs) |

Mountaineers won by 7 wickets
Harare Sports Club, Harare
Umpires: Russell Tiffin and Sifelani Rwaziyeni

- Mountaineers won the toss and elected to field.
- Emmanuel Sharara (Mashonaland Eagles) made his List A debut

28 March 2014
Scorecard

| Southern Rocks; 145 (39.5 overs) | v | Mid West Rhinos; 146/0 (23.5 overs) |
| Roy Kaia 36 (56); Bradley Wadlan 3/26 (10 overs) | | Bradley Wadlan 78* (63) |

Mid West Rhinos won by 10 wickets
Masvingo Sports Club, Masvingo
Umpires: Owen Chirombe and Christopher Phiri

- Mid West Rhinos won the toss and elected to field.

5 April 2014
Scorecard

| Mashonaland Eagles; 298/7 (50 overs) | v | Southern Rocks; 194 (41.4 overs) |
| Sikandar Raza 130 (106); Trevor Garwe 3/55 (10 overs) | | Luke Jongwe 56 (52); Bright Mugochi 3/20 (9 overs) |

Mashonaland Eagles won by 104 runs
Harare Sports Club, Harare
Umpires: Owen Chirombe and Langton Rusere

- Mashonaland Eagles won the toss and elected to bat.
- Maxwell Chifamba (Mashonaland Eagles) made his List A debut.

5 April 2014
Scorecard

| Matabeleland Tuskers; 63 (19.1 overs) | v | Mountaineers; 64/4 (15.4 overs) |
| Sean Williams 18 (19); Prosper Tsvanhu 5/14 (5.1 overs) | | Tino Mawoyo 26 (26); Steve Chimhamhiwa 3/24 (4.4 overs) |

Mountaineers won by 6 wickets (D/L method)
Mutare Club, Mutare
Umpires: Russell Tiffin and Iknow Chabi

- Mountaineers won the toss and elected to field.
- Two rain delays during the Matabeleland Tuskers innings resulted in the innings being reduced to a maximum of 37 overs. The Mountaineers were set a (D/L) target of 61 runs to win from 37 overs.

14 April 2014
Scorecard

| Matabeleland Tuskers; 164 (47.2 overs) | v | Mid West Rhinos; 142 (34.1 overs) |
| John Nyumbu 24 (35); Bradley Wadlan 3/24 (10 overs) | | Brendan Taylor 47 (49); John Nyumbu 4/45 (10 overs) |

Matabeleland Tuskers won by 22 runs
Queens Sports Club, Bulawayo
Umpires: Trevor Phiri and Langton Rusere

- Mid West Rhinos won the toss and elected to field.

14 April 2014
Scorecard

| Southern Rocks; 138 (48.4 overs) | v | Mountaineers; 139/1 (27 overs) |
| Prince Masvaure 34 (51); Donald Tiripano 3/39 (9 overs) | | Hamilton Masakadza 83* (78); Tinashe Panyangara 1/29 (8 overs) |

Mountaineers won by 9 wickets
Mutare Sports Club, Mutare
Umpires: Owen Chirombe and Iknow Chabi

- Mountaineers won the toss and elected to field.

22 April 2014
Scorecard

| Matabeleland Tuskers; 202/8 (50 overs) | v | Mashonaland Eagles; 194 (45.2 overs) |
| Godwill Mamhiyo 65 (87); Ronald Timoni 2/32 (7 overs) | | Sikandar Raza 65 (64); Tawanda Mupariwa 3/36 (10 overs) |

Matabeleland Tuskers won by 8 runs
Harare Sports Club, Harare
Umpires: Iknow Chabi and Jeremiah Matibiri

- Matabeleland Tuskers won the toss and elected to bat.
- Ronald Timoni (Mashonaland Eagles) made his List A debut.

22 April 2014
Scorecard

| Mid West Rhinos; 180 (47 overs) | v | Mountaineers; 181/3 (40.4 overs) |
| Tarisai Musakanda 71 (99); Donald Tiripano 3/43 (9 overs) | | Tino Mawoyo 55 (66); Bradley Wadlan 3/31 (10 overs) |

Mountaineers won by 7 wickets
Kwekwe Sports Club, Kwekwe
Umpires: Stanley Gogwe and Russell Tiffin

- Mountaineers won the toss and elected to field.

=== Final ===
30 April 2014
Scorecard

| Southern Rocks; 174 (48.3 overs) | v | Mountaineers; 178/3 (39.1 overs) |
| Tendai Chisoro 42* (66); Tendai Chatara 4/37 (8.3 overs) | | Timycen Maruma 69* (80); Tafadzwa Kamungozi 2/42 (10 overs) |

Mountaineers won by 7 wickets
Mutare Sports Club, Mutare
Umpires: Russell Tiffin and Owen Chirombe

- Mountaineers won the toss and elected to field.
- Mountaineers won the 2013–14 Pro50 Championship
