= List of Centrals cricketers =

The Centrals cricket team is a former Zimbabwean cricket club based in Kwekwe, Midlands Province. The club was formed for the 2006–07 Zimbabwean cricket season, when Zimbabwe Cricket revamped the first-class domestic teams after the 2005–06 Logan Cup had to be cancelled due to internal strife. The team played for three seasons, until the national cricket board decided to change the domestic format once again prior to the 2009–10 Zimbabwean cricket season, following recommendations from the International Cricket Council.

== Key ==
- ‡ denotes that player has appeared in either Test, One Day International or Twenty20 International matches for their country.
- Apps denotes the number of appearances the player has made for Centrals.
- Runs denotes the number of runs scored by the player for Centrals.
- Wkts denotes the number of wickets taken by the player for Centrals.
- † denotes the player appeared as a wicket-keeper for Centrals.
- * denotes the player captained Centrals.
- Players are initially listed according to the date of their first-team debut for the club.

== Players ==
Name	Nationality	Centrals career	Apps	Runs	Wkts	Apps	Runs	Wkts	Apps	Runs	Wkts	References
Name	Nationality	Centrals career	First-class			List A			Twenty20			References
Simba Gupo	Zimbabwe	2007–2009	8	247	0	7	80	0	–	–	–	
Bothwell Chapungu	Zimbabwe	2007–2009	13	519	0	13	170	2	9	195	0	
Tafadzwa Mpofu	Zimbabwe	2007	–	–	–	3	13	0	–	–	–	
Innocent Chikunya	Zimbabwe	2007–2008	8	229	0	4	53	0	1	5	0	
Tarisai Mahlunge †	Zimbabwe	2007–2009	11	528	0	8	139	3	11	118	0	
Patrick Gada	Zimbabwe	2007	–	–	–	2	1	2	–	–	–	
Blessing Juspen	Zimbabwe	2007	–	–	–	1	5	0	–	–	–	
Remembrance Nyathi	Zimbabwe	2007–2009	8	282	18	9	103	4	10	55	2	
Solomon Mire	Zimbabwe	2007–2008	5	186	3	8	272	7	3	45	4	
Johannes Matigonda *	Zimbabwe	2007–2008	4	53	6	4	30	4	–	–	–	
Taurai Muzarabani	Zimbabwe	2007–2009	13	125	31	8	46	12	7	12	3	
Erick Chauluka *	Zimbabwe	2007–2009	14	610	1	12	262	2	5	45	1	
Michael Chinouya	Zimbabwe	2007–2009	11	49	32	10	20	10	8	21	13	
Gary Chirimuuta	Zimbabwe	2007–2008	–	–	–	1	50	0	1	0	0	
Brighton Mugochi	Zimbabwe	2007–2009	13	166	57	5	39	8	10	9	7	
Walter Chawaguta	Zimbabwe	2007–2009	5	198	3	–	–	–	–	–	–	
Ed Rainsford ‡	Zimbabwe	2007–2009	9	167	42	4	21	8	8	31	4	
Friday Kasteni ‡	Zimbabwe	2008–2009	2	72	0	4	84	0	9	152	0	
Malcolm Waller ‡	Zimbabwe	2008–2009	9	601	5	10	201	5	10	254	0	
Luther Mutyambizi	Zimbabwe	2008	1	7	0	–	–	–	–	–	–	
Tendai Chitongo	Zimbabwe	2008–2009	4	144	1	6	36	7	7	51	4	
Tapfumaneyi Mandizha	Zimbabwe	2008	–	–	–	1	0	0	–	–	–	
Alexander Mavhiko	Zimbabwe	2008	–	–	–	1	0	1	–	–	–	
Chamunorwa Chibhabha *‡	Zimbabwe	2009	5	366	10	6	234	3	7	227	7	
Roy Kaia	Zimbabwe	2009	1	29	0	4	33	0	–	–	–	
Richmond Mutumbami †	Zimbabwe	2009	4	103	0	6	131	0	4	83	0	
Robertson Chinyengetere	Zimbabwe	2009	3	48	6	3	91	0	–	–	–	
Tafadzwa Kamungozi ‡	Zimbabwe	2009	5	137	17	5	36	6	6	1	5	
Tendai Chisoro	Zimbabwe	2009	2	82	0	3	23	5	5	147	2	
Blessing Mahwire ‡	Zimbabwe	2009	1	0	1	3	25	1	–	–	–	
Nathan Waller	Zimbabwe	2009	–	–	–	2	28	0	–	–	–	
Tanyaradzwa Munyaradzi	Zimbabwe	2009	–	–	–	1	0	0	–	–	–	
Alois Tichana	Zimbabwe	2009	3	103	0	–	–	–	–	–	–	
Bekezela Moyo †	Zimbabwe	2009	1	4	0	–	–	–	–	–	–	
Kudzai Maunze	Zimbabwe	2009	1	7	0	–	–	–	–	–	–	
Brian Vitori	Zimbabwe	2009	1	7	0	–	–	–	–	–	–	
