= 2014–15 Pro50 Championship =

- Dates: 9 November 2014 – 21 March 2015
- Administrator: Zimbabwe Cricket
- Cricket format: List A cricket
- Tournament format: Round-robin + Final
- Champions: Mashonaland Eagles (3rd title)
- Participants: 4
- Matches: 19
- Most runs: Roy Kaia (382)
- Most wickets: Christopher Mpofu (19)

The 2014–15 Pro50 Championship was the thirteenth edition of the Pro50 Championship, a List A cricket tournament in Zimbabwe. The competition began on 9 November 2014 and the final was played on 21 March 2015. After the 2013-14 season, Southern Rocks had their franchise suspended, leaving only four teams to compete.

Mashonaland Eagles won the tournament for the third time, having finished in second place in the round-robin, but defeated the Matabeleland Tuskers in the final by 4 wickets.

Mountaineers batsman Roy Kaia was the tournament's leading run-scorer with a total of 382 runs. Matabeleland Tuskers bowler Christopher Mpofu was the leading wicket-tacker with a total of 19 wickets.

== Points table ==
Pos	Team	Pld	W	L	T	NR	BP	Pts	NRR
1	Matabeleland Tuskers	9	7	2	0	0	3	31	0.418
2	Mashonaland Eagles	9	5	4	0	0	1	21	−0.105
3	Mountaineers	9	4	5	0	0	3	19	0.278
4	Mid West Rhinos	9	2	7	0	0	1	9	−0.581

Qualified for the final

== Fixtures ==
=== Round-robin ===
9 November 2014
Scorecard

Mid West Rhinos; 148 (42.5 overs)	v	Mashonaland Eagles; 198 (44.3 overs)
Nyasha Mayavo 43 (65); Tinotenda Mutombodzi 3/32 (10 overs)		Ryan Burl 68* (99); Steven Trenchard 1/11 (3 overs)

Mashonaland Eagles won by 5 wickets
Old Hararians, Harare
Umpires: Iknow Chabi and Jeremiah Matibiri

- Mid West Rhinos won the toss and elected to bat.
- Ryan Burl (Mashonaland Eagles) made his List A debut.

9 November 2014
Scorecard

Matabeleland Tuskers; 261/6 (50 overs)	v	Mountaineers; 191/8 (50 overs)
Sean Williams 100 (109); Victor Nyauchi 2/60 (6 overs)		Roy Kaia 66 (95); Brian Vitori 3/50 (9 overs)

Matabeleland Tuskers won by 70 runs
Queens Sports Club, Bulawayo
Umpires: Trevor Phiri and Langton Rusere

- Mountaineers won the toss and elected to field.
- Devesh Hassani (Matabeleland Tuskers) made his List A debut.

22 November 2014
Scorecard

Matabeleland Tuskers; 207/8 (50 overs)	v	Mid West Rhinos; 107 (35.3 overs)
Nkosana Mpofu 46 (72); Kudakwashe Munyede 3/32 (10 overs)		Mark Mbofana 25 (45); Tawanda Mupariwa 3/13 (6 overs)

Matabeleland Tuskers won by 100 runs
Kwekwe Sports Club, Kwekwe
Umpires: Stanley Gogwe and Russell Tiffin

- Matabeleland Tuskers won the toss and elected to bat.
- Shoun Handirisi (Matabeleland Tuskers) made his List A debut.

22 November 2014
Scorecard

Mountaineers; 292/7 (50 overs)	v	Mashonaland Eagles; 246 (45.2 overs)
Kevin Kasuza 89 (106); Trevor Garwe 3/43 (10 overs)		Tinotenda Mutombodzi 38 (49); Cuthbert Musoko 3/46 (8 overs)

Mountaineers won by 46 runs
Mutare Sports Club, Mutare
Umpires: Sifelani Rwaziyeni and Owen Chirombe

- Mashonaland Eagles won the toss and elected to field.

7 December 2014
Scorecard

Mashonaland Eagles; 125 (40.4 overs)	v	Matabeleland Tuskers; 128/7 (40.3 overs)
Tinotenda Mutombodzi 41* (54); John Nyumbu 4/19 (8 overs)		Godwill Mamhiyo 45 (97); Trevor Garwe 3/25 (8 overs)

Matabeleland Tuskers won by 3 wickets
Queens Sports Club, Bulawayo
Umpires: Russell Tiffin and Christopher Phiri

- Matabeleland Tuskers won the toss and elected to field.

7 December 2014
Scorecard

Mid West Rhinos; 194/8 (50 overs)	v	Mountaineers; 195/4 (38 overs)
Tendai Chisoro 59 (68); Shingirai Masakadza 3/45 (10 overs)		Stuart Matsikenyeri 100* (83); Neville Madziva 1/13 (4 overs)

Mountaineers won by 6 wickets
Kwekwe Sports Club, Kwekwe
Umpires: Owen Chirombe and Iknow Chabi

- Mountaineers won the toss and elected to field.

14 January 2015
Scorecard

Matabeleland Tuskers; 213 (49.2 overs)	v	Mashonaland Eagles; 216/2 (41.4 overs)
Craig Ervine 103 (124); Sikandar Raza 4/33 (9 overs)		Sikandar Raza 106* (11); Christopher Mpofu 1/41 (9 overs)

Mashonaland Eagles won by 8 wickets
Harare Sports Club, Harare
Umpires: Sifelani Rwaziyeni and Langton Rusere

- Matabeleland Tuskers won the toss and elected to bat.

14 January 2015
Scorecard

Mountaineers; 175 (45.5 overs)	v	Mid West Rhinos; 179/6 (42.2 overs)
Stuart Matsikenyeri 31 (46); Brian Vitori 3/50 (8 overs)		Prince Masvaure 49 (56); Natsai M'shangwe 2/26 (10 overs)

Mid West Rhinos won by 4 wickets
Mutare Sports Club, Mutare
Umpires: Ashby Mutumbami and Owen Chirombe

- Mid West Rhinos won the toss and elected to field.

17 January 2015
Scorecard

Mashonaland Eagles; 267/5 (44 overs)	v	Mountaineers; 172/4 (30 overs)
Sikandar Raza 104 (97); Donald Tiripano 2/54 (8 overs)		Hamilton Masakadza 93* (93); Taurai Muzarabani 2/27 (5 overs)

Mashonaland Eagles won by 1 run (D/L method)
Harare Sports Club, Harare
Umpires: Russell Tiffin and Iknow Chabi

- Mashonaland Eagles won the toss and elected to bat.
- A rain delay during the Eagles innings resulted in a loss of six overs. The Mountaineers response was ended by rain after 30 overs with a DLS victory target of 174 runs.

17 January 2015
Scorecard

Matabeleland Tuskers; 223 (49.2 overs)	v	Mid West Rhinos; 188 (44.5 overs)
Craig Ervine 70 (89); Kudakwashe Munyede 4/41 (7 overs)		Malcolm Waller 62 (77); Christopher Mpofu 3/36 (9 overs)

Matabeleland Tuskers won by 35 runs
Queens Sports Club, Bulawayo
Umpires: Trevor Phiri and Langton Rusere

- Mid West Rhinos won the toss and elected to field.

21 January 2015
Scorecard

Mashonaland Eagles; 281/9 (50 overs)	v	Mid West Rhinos; 238 (45.3 overs)
Brendan Taylor 61 (69); Michael Chinouya 3/52 (6 overs)		Prince Masvaure 58 (69); Sikandar Raza 3/43 (10 overs)

Mashonaland Eagles won by 43 runs
Kwekwe Sports Club, Kwekwe
Umpires: Stanley Gogwe and Owen Chirombe

- Mid West Rhinos won the toss and elected to field.
- James Bruce (Mid West Rhinos) made his List A debut.

21 January 2015
Scorecard

Mountaineers; 255/9 (50 overs)	v	Matabeleland Tuskers; 124 (27.2 overs)
Hamilton Masakadza 85 (79); Christopher Mpofu 3/46 (10 overs)		Godwill Mamhiyo 35 (52); Tendai Chatara 4/31 (9 overs)

Mountaineers won by 131 runs
Mutare Sports Club, Mutare
Umpires: Ashby Mutumbami and Iknow Chabi

- Matabeleland Tuskers won the toss and elected to field.

25 January 2015
Scorecard

Mountaineers; 267/5 (50 overs)	v	Mashonaland Eagles; 207 (44.5 overs)
Roy Kaia 85* (102); Wellington Masakadza 2/43 (10 overs)		Greg Lamb 73 (74); Tapiwa Mufudza 4/28 (9.5 overs)

Mountaineers won by 60 runs
Harare Sports Club, Harare
Umpires: Russell Tiffin and Sifelani Rwaziyeni

- Mashonaland Eagles won the toss and elected to field.

25 January 2015
Scorecard

Mid West Rhinos; 185 (43.2 overs)	v	Matabeleland Tuskers; 188/6 (46.2 overs)
Prince Masvaure 51 (82); Thabo Mboyi 4/21 (7.2 overs)		Brian Chari 63 (84); Tawanda Mupariwa 3/43 (9.2 overs)

Matabeleland Tuskers won by 4 wickets
Queens Sports Club, Bulawayo
Umpires: Owen Chirombe and Lucky Ngwenya

- Mid West Rhinos won the toss and elected to bat.

1 March 2015
Scorecard

Mid West Rhinos; 206/9 (50 overs)	v	Mashonaland Eagles; 195/6 (44 overs)
Malcolm Waller 48 (62); Trevor Garwe 4/24 (10 overs)		Mark Pettini 74 (84); Mark Mbofana 2/37 (7 overs)

Mashonaland Eagles won by 26 runs (D/L method)
Old Hararians, Harare
Umpires: Russell Tiffin and Iknow Chabi

- Mid West Rhinos won the toss and elected to bat.
- (D/L) target for the Eagles after 44 overs was 170 runs to win.
- Ryan Bezuidenhout (Mid West Rhinos) made his List A debut.

1 March 2015
Scorecard

Mountaineers; 197 (49.2 overs)	v	Matabeleland Tuskers; 141/6 (30.4 overs)
Tino Mawoyo 43 (60); Keith Dabengwa 3/35 (10 overs)		Keith Dabengwa 49* (58); Roy Kaia 3/32 (7 overs)

Matabeleland Tuskers won by 4 wickets (D/L method)
Queens Sports Club, Bulawayo
Umpires: Trevor Phiri and Owen Chirombe

- Mountaineers won the toss and elected to bat.
- A rain delay after the first 12 overs of the Matabeleland Tuskers innings resulted in a revised (D/L) target of 139 runs from 31 overs.
- Ainsley Ndlovu (Matabeleland Tuskers) made his List A debut.

17 March 2015
Scorecard

Matabeleland Tuskers; 279/5 (50 overs)	v	Mashonaland Eagles; 205 (43 overs)
Brian Chari 115 (125); Cephas Zhuwao 2/48 (6 overs)		Joylord Gumbie 39 (40); Brian Vitori 3/39 (10 overs)

Matabeleland Tuskers won by 74 runs
Queens Sports Club, Bulawayo
Umpires: Jeremiah Matibiri and Lucky Ngwenya

- Mashonaland Eagles won the toss and elected to field.

17 March 2015
Scorecard

Mountaineers; 211/8 (50 overs)	v	Mid West Rhinos; 212/7 (35.3 overs)
Roy Kaia 101* (144); Tendai Chisoro 3/38 (10 overs)		Prince Masvaure 68* (78); Natsai M'shangwe 3/40 (10 overs)

Mid West Rhinos won by 3 wickets
Kwekwe Sports Club, Kwekwe
Umpires: Stanley Gogwe and Owen Chirombe

- Mountaineers won the toss and elected to bat.

=== Final ===
21 March 2015
Scorecard

Matabeleland Tuskers; 266/7 (50 overs)	v	Mashonaland Eagles; 268/6 (49.3 overs)
Godwill Mamhiyo 63 (55); Wellington Masakadza 2/39 (10 overs)		Tinotenda Mutombodzi 79 (76); Keith Dabengwa 1/22 (5 overs)

Mashonaland Eagles won by 4 wickets
Queens Sports Club, Bulawayo
Umpires: Russell Tiffin and Jeremiah Matibiri
Player of the match: Tinotenda Mutombodzi (Mashonaland Eagles)

- Matabeleland Tuskers won the toss and elected to bat.
- Mashonaland Eagles won the 2014–15 Pro50 Championship
