= Zimbabwe A cricket team in Bangladesh 2014–15 =

Zimbabwe A cricket team in Bangladesh in 2014–15
	Bangladesh	Zimbabwe
- Dates: 14 September – 1 October 2014
Captains	Naeem Islam (FC); Marshall Ayub (LA)	Vusi Sibanda

Test series
- Result: Bangladesh won the 2-match series 2–0
Most runs	Shadman Islam (124)	Brian Chari (174)
Most wickets	Saqlain Sajib (21)	Wellington Masakadza (12)

One Day International series
- Results: Bangladesh won the 3-match series 2–1
Most runs	Soumya Sarkar (164)	Vusi Sibanda (163)
Most wickets	Mominul Haque (6)	Tafadzwa Kamungozi (8)

The Zimbabwe A cricket team toured Bangladesh from 14 September to 1 October 2014. The tour consisted of two Unofficial Test matches and three unofficial ODIs matches. This tour was organised in June–July 2014 after Bangladesh postponed due to monsoon season, and was rescheduled in September–October 2014.

== Squads ==
Bangladesh		Zimbabwe
First-class	List A	First-class and List A
Liton Das; Shadman Islam; Marshall Ayub; Farhad Hossain; Rakibul Hasan; Sabbir Rahman; Naeem Islam; Nurul Hasan (wk); Kamrul Islam Rabbi; Jubair Hossain; Saqlain Sajib; Shahadat Hossain; Mohammad Shahid; Muktar Ali		Vusimuzi Sibanda (C); Regis Chakabva (wk); Brian Chari; Michael Chinouya; Joylord Gumbie; Luke Jongwe; Tafadzwa Kamungozi; Neville Madziva; Tatenda Manatsa; Timycen Maruma; Shingi Masakadza; Tino Mawoyo; Kudakwashe Munyede; Tawanda Mupariwa; Forster Mutizwa; Tinotenda Mutombodzi; Richmond Mutumbami (wk); Taurai Muzarabani; Mark Vermeulen; Malcolm Waller

== Unofficial Test series ==
=== 1st Unofficial Test ===
14 September 2014
Scorecard

Bangladesh A	v	Zimbabwe A
211 (120.4 overs); Litton Das 54 (104); Wellington Masakadza 6/63 (38 overs)		207 (74.1 overs); Regis Chakabva 64 (110); Saqlain Sajib 9/82 (31.1 overs)
105/4 (38.2 overs); Litton Das 23* (42); Wellington Masakadza 1/27 (8 overs)		108 (48.2 overs); Brian Chari 23 (67); Saqlain Sajib 6/50 (21.2 overs)

Bangladesh A won by 6 wickets
Sheikh Kamal International Cricket Stadium, Cox's Bazar
Umpires: Masudur Rahman (Ban) and Sharfuddoula (Ban)

- Zimbabwe A won the toss chose to bat
- Jubair Hossain (Ban A) made first-class debut

=== 2nd Unofficial Test ===
21 September 2014
Scorecard

Bangladesh A	v	Zimbabwe A
258 (96 overs); Shahriar Nafees 97 (140); Vusi Sibanda 5/55 (29 overs)		132 (39.5 overs); Brian Chari 47 (95); Shahadat Hossain 4/33 (10 overs)
172/6d (67.5 overs); Marshall Ayub 53 (123); Taurai Muzarabani 2/37 (11 overs)		180 (63.5 overs); Brian Chari 74 (130); Saqlain Sajib 5/75 (28.5 overs)

Bangladesh A won by 118 runs
Fatullah Osmani Stadium, Fatullah
Umpires: Anisur Rahman (Ban) and Enamul Haque (Ban)
Player of the match: Jubair Hossain (Bangladesh A)

- Zimbabwe A won the toss and elected to field.

== Unofficial ODIs series ==
=== 1st unofficial ODI ===
27 September 2014
Scorecard

Zimbabwe A 253/6 (50 overs)	v	Bangladesh A 236 (49.3 overs)
Regis Chakabva 132 (144); Mominul Haque 2/47 (10 overs)		Naeem Islam 66 (85); Tafadzwa Kamungozi 4/24 (10 overs)

Zimbabwe A won by 17 runs
Fatullah Osmani Stadium, Fatullah
Umpires: Tanvir Ahmed (Ban) and Anisur Rahman (Ban)
Player of the match: Regis Chakabva (Zimbabwe A)

- Zimbabwe A won the toss and elected to bat.
- Jubair Hossain (Ban A) made his List-A debut.

=== 2nd unofficial ODI ===
29 September 2014
Scorecard

Zimbabwe A 163/9 (50 overs)	v	Bangladesh A 158/4 (31.4 overs)
Vusi Sibanda 74 (97); Soumya Sarkar 2/23 (4 overs)		Soumya Sarkar 86 (83); Wellington Masakadza 2/18 (5.4 overs)

Bangladesh A won by 6 wickets (DLS method)
Fatullah Osmani Stadium, Fatullah
Umpires: Enamul Haque (Ban) and Gazi Sohel (Ban)
Player of the match: Soumya Sarkar (Bangladesh A)

- Zimbabwe A won the toss and elected to bat.
- Bangladesh A were set a revised target of 158 runs from 47 overs due to rain.

=== 3rd unofficial ODI ===
1 October 2014
Scorecard

Bangladesh A 239 (50 overs)	v	Zimbabwe A 208/8 (50 overs)
Marshall Ayub 57 (78); Taurai Muzarabani 4/33 (7 overs)		Malcolm Waller 52 (77); Mominul Haque 3/36 (10 overs)

Bangladesh A won by 31 runs
Fatullah Osmani Stadium, Fatullah
Umpires: Mahfuzur Rahman (Ban) and Sharfuddoula (Ban)
Player of the match: Marshall Ayub (Bangladesh A)

- Bangladesh A won the toss and elected to bat.
