= Zimbabwean cricket team in South Africa in 2006–07 =

Zimbabweans in South Africa in 2006–07
	Zimbabwe	South Africa
- Dates: 13 September – 20 September 2006
Captains	Prosper Utseya	Jacques Kallis

One Day International series
- Results: South Africa won the 3-match series 3–0
Most runs	Chamu Chibhabha (121)	Mark Boucher (155)
Most wickets	Anthony Ireland (3); Ed Rainsford (3)	Jacques Kallis (4); André Nel (4)
- Player of the series: Mark Boucher

The Zimbabwean cricket team toured South Africa for three One-day Internationals and one Twenty20 match against Eagles from 13 to 20 September 2006.

South Africa won the series 3–0. Zimbabwe were described by Independent Online as a side of "no more than club standard", and the tour was described by South African coach Mickey Arthur as "part of the training camp" for the 2006 ICC Champions Trophy.

== Schedule ==
Date	Match	Venue
13 September	Tour Twenty20 v Eagles	De Beers Diamond Oval
15 September	1st ODI	Goodyear Park
17 September	2nd ODI	Buffalo Park
20 September	3rd ODI	North West Cricket Stadium

== Squads ==
South Africa
Graeme Smith	LHB, OB	Cape Cobras
Jacques Kallis c	RHB, RFM	Cape Cobras
Loots Bosman	RHB, RM	Eagles
Mark Boucher wk	RHB	Warriors
A. B. de Villiers wk	RHB, RM	Titans
Boeta Dippenaar	RHB, OB	Eagles
J. P. Duminy	LHB, OB	Cape Cobras
Herschelle Gibbs	RHB, RM	Cape Cobras
Andrew Hall	RHB, RFM	Lions
Justin Kemp	RHB, RFM	Titans
Charl Langeveldt	RHB, RFM	Lions
André Nel	RHB, RFM	Titans
Makhaya Ntini	RHB, RF	Warriors
Alviro Petersen	RHB, RM	Lions
Robin Peterson	LHB, SLA	Warriors
Shaun Pollock	RHB, RFM	Dolphins
Roger Telemachus	RHB, RFM	Eagles
Johannes van der Wath	RHB, RF	Eagles

Zimbabwe
Prosper Utseya c	RHB, OB	Manicaland
Brendan Taylor wk	RHB	Mashonaland
Chamu Chibhabha	RHB, RM	Mashonaland
Elton Chigumbura	RHB, OB	Manicaland
Terry Duffin	LHB, RM	Matabeleland
Anthony Ireland	RHB, RM	Midlands
Tafadzwa Kamungozi	RHB, LB	Masvingo
Timycen Maruma	RHB, OB	Manicaland
Hamilton Masakadza	RHB, LB G	Manicaland
Stuart Matsikenyeri	RHB, OB	Manicaland
Tafadzwa Mufambisi	RHB, OB	Mashonaland
Tawanda Mupariwa	RHB, RFM	Matabeleland
Ed Rainsford	RHB, RFM	Midlands
Piet Rinke	RHB, RFM	Manicaland
Vusimuzi Sibanda	RHB, RM	Midlands
Gregory Strydom	RHB, RM	Matabeleland

== Matches ==
=== Tour match: Eagles v Zimbabweans ===
Eagles won by nine wickets

Zimbabwe lost their last nine wickets for 24 runs, against a bowling attack including three former South Africa internationals in Johannes van der Wath, Roger Telemachus and Nicky Boje. Opener Davey Jacobs hit an unbeaten half-century in reply, as Eagles overcame the target of 104 inside 11.4 of the 20 allotted overs.

=== 1st One-day International, 15 September ===
15 September 2006
Scorecard

Zimbabwe; 201/7 (50 overs)	v	South Africa; 202/5 (43.5 overs)
V Sibanda 51 (78); JH Kallis 2/16 (6 overs)		HH Dippenaar 85* (127); EC Rainsford 2/29 (10 overs)

South Africa won by 5 wickets
Goodyear Park, Bloemfontein
Umpires: DJ Harper (AUS) and BG Jerling (SA)
Player of the match: HH Dippenaar (SA)

- Zimbabwe won the toss and elected to bat
- LE Bosman (SA) made his ODI debut

Vusimuzi Sibanda top scored for Zimbabwe with his fifth One-day International half-century, as the only one to pass 40 in South Africa's innings. Justice Chibhabha and Hamilton Masakadza contributed 30s as Zimbabwe made it 137 for two after the 33rd over, but the last 17 provided runs at a slower rate as Jacques Kallis, Makhaya Ntini and Shaun Pollock kept the run rate when they bowled below three an over. Robin Peterson's five overs cost 35, however, and he was the least economical bowler of the match (excluding Hamilton Masakadza who didn't bowl a full over).

South Africa lost their first three wickets within 10 overs, scoring 33 as Loots Bosman, Herschelle Gibbs and Jacques Kallis, but a 121-run partnership between Boeta Dippenaar and J. P. Duminy left 48 runs from the remaining 17 overs. Despite wickets from Stuart Matsikenyeri and Ed Rainsford, South Africa made it through with five wickets to spare.

=== 2nd One-day International (Replay), 18 September ===
18 September 2006 (D/N)
Scorecard

Zimbabwe; 152 (49.4 overs)	v	South Africa; 156/4 (27.4 overs)
CJ Chibhabha 38 (100); AJ Hall 3/23 (8.4 overs)		LE Bosman 38 (29); HP Rinke 2/35 (6 overs)

South Africa won by 6 wickets
Buffalo Park, East London
Umpires: DJ Harper (AUS) and IL Howell (SA)
Player of the match: AJ Hall (SA)

- Zimbabwe won the toss and elected to bat
- AN Petersen (SA) made his ODI debut

The Second ODI was initially scheduled to be played on 17 September but was abandoned without a ball being bowled. It was replayed on 18 September. Zimbabwe won the toss and elected to bat first. Chamu Chibhabha top scored for the tourists with 38 off 101 balls. Elton Chigumbura made 30 while Tafadzwa Mufambisi and Prosper Utseya contributed 20s as Zimbabwe were bundled out for 152 inside 50 overs. Andrew Hall was the pick of the South African bowlers picking up 3 wickets for 23 runs. Makhaya Ntini, Robin Peterson and Jacques Kallis picked up 2 wickets each.

Boeta Dippenaar was the first wicket to fall for South Africa in the 4th over. However Loots Bosman played aggressively to score 38 runs off just 29 balls hitting 2 sixes in the process. By the time Jacques Kallis fell, South Africa needed 43 runs from 184 balls. J. P. Duminy and Justin Kemp took South Africa home inside 30 overs. Andrew Hall was declared Man of the Match.

=== 3rd One-day International, 20 September ===
20 September 2006 (D/N)
Scorecard

South Africa; 418/5 (50 overs)	v	Zimbabwe; 247/4 (50 overs)
MV Boucher 147* (68); T Kamungozi 2/70 (10 overs)		T Duffin 88 (134); R Telemachus 2/33 (8 overs)

South Africa won by 171 runs
Sedgars Park, Potchefstroom
Umpires: DJ Harper (AUS) and BG Jerling (SA)
Player of the match: MV Boucher (SA)

- South Africa won the toss and elected to bat
- T Kamungozi (ZIM) made his ODI debut

Zimbabwe were "beaten to their knees by a brutal display of power" that began with the openers Loots Bosman and Alviro Petersen before Mark Boucher came in and registered his first one-day century in his 220th match, and also the second quickest of all time. This was the fourth total of more than 400 in ODI history, and the second time in four games that South Africa scored more than 400. Both the openers scored 80s, and Bosman was the first to fall with the score on 160 in the 21st over. Captain Jacques Kallis scored a 50 off 59 balls. However it was Mark Boucher who turned out to be the hero of the day. He scored 147 off just 68 balls which included 10 sixes. Zimbabwe's "shoddy" fielding helped: he was dropped six times. Ed Rainsford was the only Zimbabwean bowler whose economy rate was below 6 runs per over, though Prosper Utseya and Tafadzwa Kamungozi picked up two wickets each but went for 77 and 70 runs respectively.

The match "effectively ended after the first innings", according to the Cricinfo report, as Zimbabwe batted out the 50 overs without losing wickets. Terry Duffin led the resistance with a defiant 87, supported by Chamu Chibhabha and Hamilton Masakadza, with whom he added 94 and 102 for the second and third wickets. Zimbabwe finished with 247 for 4, their highest total of the series, and their highest total against a top-eight nation (the Test nations excluding 10th-ranked Bangladesh), since May 2006.
