= Afghan cricket team in Zimbabwe in 2014 =

	Zimbabwe	Afghanistan
- Dates: 13 July 2014 – 5 August 2014
Captains	Brendan Taylor	Mohammad Nabi

One Day International series
- Results: 4-match series drawn 2–2
Most runs	Sikandar Raza Butt (210)	Usman Ghani (175)
Most wickets	Donald Tiripano (7)	Sharafuddin Ashraf (6)
- Player of the series: Sikandar Raza Butt

The Afghanistan national cricket team toured Zimbabwe from 13 July to 5 August 2014, playing four ODIs and two first-class matches against the Zimbabwean team. The tour was originally scheduled for January 2014 but it was postponed until later in the year due to player strikes in Zimbabwe. The four-match series was drawn 2-2.

== Squads ==
ODIs		FC	
Zimbabwe	Afghanistan	Zimbabwe	Afghanistan
Brendan Taylor (c & wk); Regis Chakabva (wk); Tendai Chatara; Elton Chigumbura; Timycen Maruma; Hamilton Masakadza; Shingi Masakadza; Natsai M'shangwe; Richmond Mutumbami; Tinashe Panyangara; Sikandar Raza Butt; Donald Tiripano; Prosper Utseya; Malcolm Waller; Sean Williams; Vusi Sibanda (dropped)	Mohammad Nabi (c); Aftab Alam; Asghar Stanikzai; Dawlat Zadran; Gulbadin Naib; Hashmatullah Shaidi; Javed Ahmadi; Mirwais Ashraf; Nasir Jamal; Noor Ali Zadran; Rahmat Shah; Samiullah Shenwari; Shafiqullah (wk); Shapoor Zadran; Sharafuddin Ashraf; Usman Ghani	Regis Chakabva (c & wk); Brian Chari; Tendai Chatara; Innocent Chinyoka; Joylord Gumbie; Tatenda Manatsa; Luke Jongwe; Roy Kaia; Neville Madziva; Tinotenda Mutombodzi; Richmond Mutumbami; John Nyumbu; Sikandar Raza Butt; Mark Vermeulen; Brian Vitori; Malcolm Waller	Mohammad Nabi (c); Abdullah Adil; Fareed Ahmad; Fazal Niazai; Karim Sadiq; Mirwais Ashraf; Mohammad Mujtaba; Mohibullah Oryakhel; Najeeb Tarakai; Najibullah Zadran; Nasir Jamal; Qasim Khan (wk); Rahmat Shah; Shabir Noori; Sharafuddin Ashraf; Yamin Ahmadzai

== Tour matches ==
=== List A: Zimbabwe A v Afghans ===
13 July 2014
09:00
Scorecard

Afghanistan; 209 (50 overs)	v	Zimbabwe A 193 (48.3 overs)
Usman Ghani 79 (110); Michael Chinouya 2/30 (10 overs)		Tinotenda Mutombodzi 60 (70); Sharafuddin Ashraf 6/29 (9.3 overs)

Afghanistan won by 16 runs
Bulawayo Athletic Club, Bulawayo
Umpires: Langton Rusere (Zim) and Owen Chirombe (Zim)
Player of the match: Sharafuddin Ashraf (Afg)

- Zimbabwe A won the toss and elected to field.
- Sharafuddin Ashraf (Afg) made his List A debut.

=== List A: Zimbabwe A v Afghans ===
15 July 2014
09:00
Scorecard

Afghanistan; 268/7 (50 overs)	v	Zimbabwe A 272/3 (48 overs)
Nasir Jamal 64* (76); Luke Jongwe 3/74 (10 overs)		Richmond Mutumbami 73 (Retired Hurt) (68); Samiullah Shenwari 1/46 (9 overs)

Zimbabwe A won by 7 wickets
Queens Sports Club, Bulawayo
Umpires: Jeremiah Matibiri (Zim) and Christopher Phiri (Zim)

- Zimbabwe A won the toss and elected to field.
- Richmond Mutumbami retired hurt at 127/2.

== ODI series ==
=== 1st ODI ===
18 July 2014
09:00
Scorecard

Zimbabwe; 227/4 (45.2 overs)	v	Afghanistan; 221/9 (50 overs)
Sean Williams 70 (65); Shapoor Zadran 1/32 (9 Overs)		Samiullah Shenwari 65* (85); Tendai Chatara 2/37 (8 overs)

Zimbabwe won by 6 wickets
Queens Sports Club, Bulawayo
Umpires: Johan Cloete (SA) and Russell Tiffin (Zim)
Player of the match: Sean Williams (Zim)

- Zimbabwe won the toss and elected to field.
- Sharafuddin Ashraf (Afg) and Donald Tiripano (Zim) made their ODI debuts.

=== 2nd ODI ===
20 July 2014
09:00
Scorecard

Afghanistan; 256/7 (50 overs)	v	Zimbabwe; 257/2 (43.3 overs)
Usman Ghani 118 (143); Sikandar Raza 2/25 (5 overs)		Sikandar Raza 141 (133); Samiullah Shenwari 1/37 (5.3 overs)

Zimbabwe won by 8 wickets
Queens Sports Club, Bulawayo
Umpires: Owen Chirombe (Zim) and Johan Cloete (SA)
Player of the match: Sikandar Raza (Zim)

- Zimbabwe won the toss and elected to field.
- The 224-run partnership between Sikandar Raza and Hamilton Masakadza is Zimbabwe's highest for any wicket.
- Usman Ghani scored the highest score by an Afghanistan batsman.

=== 3rd ODI ===
22 July 2014
09:00
Scorecard

Zimbabwe; 261/8 (50 overs)	v	Afghanistan; 264/8 (49.4 overs)
Hamilton Masakadza 84 (93); Aftab Alam 2/44 (10 overs)		Javed Ahmadi 56 (57); Sean Williams 2/33 (10 overs)

Afghanistan won by 2 wickets
Queens Sports Club, Bulawayo
Umpires: Jeremiah Matibiri (Zim) and Johan Cloete (SA)
Player of the match: Hamilton Masakadza (Zim)

- Afghanistan won the toss and elected to field.
- Nasir Jamal (Afg) made his ODI debut.

=== 4th ODI ===
24 July 2014
09:00
Scorecard

Afghanistan; 259 (49.1 overs)	v	Zimbabwe; 159 (38 overs)
Shafiqullah 56 (43); Donald Tiripano 5/63 (9.1 overs)		Richmond Mutumbami 64 (75); Sharafuddin Ashraf 3/29 (9 overs)

Afghanistan won by 100 runs
Queens Sports Club, Bulawayo
Umpires: Owen Chirombe (Zim) and Johan Cloete (SA)
Player of the match: Donald Tiripano (Zim)

- Zimbabwe won the toss and elected to field.
- Richmond Mutumbami (Zim) made his ODI debut.

== First-class series ==
=== First FC ===
27–30 July 2014
Scorecard

Afghanistan	v	Zimbabwe A
105 (47.1 overs); Rahmat Shah 27 (50); Tendai Chatara 5/31 (16 overs)		165 (44.5 overs); Luke Jongwe 58 (86); Fareed Ahmad 5/54 (11 overs)
321 (92.5 overs); Najibullah Zadran 99 (103); Michael Chinouya 4/62 (16 overs)		226 (75.5 overs); Mark Vermeulen 107 (174); Mirwais Ashraf 6/35 (19 overs)

Afghanistan won by 35 runs
Country Club, Harare
Umpires: Langton Rusere (Zim) & Russell Tiffin (Zim)

- Zimbabwe A won the toss and elected to field
- Fareed Ahmad, Najeeb Tarakai and Qaseem Khan made first-class debuts

=== Second FC ===
2–5 August 2014
Scorecard

Afghanistan	v	Zimbabwe A
169 (54.1 overs); Qaseem Khan 37 (75); Cuthbert Musoko 3/39 (13 overs)		157 (47.4 overs); Richmond Mutumbami 44 (69); Sharafuddin Ashraf 5/33 (10 overs)
99 (38.3 overs); Rahmat Shah 24 (56); Natsai M'shangwe 4/20 (6.3 overs)		112/2 (24.3 overs); Mark Vermeulen 47*; Sharafuddin Ashraf 1/23 (7 overs)

Zimbabwe A won by 8 wickets
Country Club, Harare
Umpires: Iknow Chabi (Zim) & Jeremiah Matibiri (Zim)

- Afghanistan won the toss and chose to bat
- Abdullah Adil, Mohammad Mujtaba, Nasir Jamal and Sharafuddin Ashraf (AFG) made first-class debuts
