= Tafadzwa =

Tafadzwa is a Zimbabwean given name that may refer to

- Tafadzwa Chitokwindo (born 1990), Zimbabwean rugby player
- Tafadzwa Dube (born 1984), Zimbabwean football goalkeeper
- Tafadzwa Kamungozi (born 1987), Zimbabwean cricketer
- Tafadzwa Madondo (1981–2008), Zimbabwean cricketer
- Tafadzwa Manyimo (born 1977), Zimbabwean cricketer
- Tafadzwa Mpofu (born 1985), Zimbabwean cricketer
- Tafadzwa Mufambisi (born 1986), Zimbabwean cricketer
- Tafadzwa Chando (born 1997), Zimbabwean climate, energy & trade expert
- Tafadzwa Rusike (born 1989), Zimbabwean football player
- Tafadzwa Tsiga (born 1994), Zimbabwean cricketer
