= Mpofu (surname) =

Mpofu is a surname found in Southern Africa, mainly in Zimbabwe and South Africa. Notable people with this surname include:

- Christopher Mpofu (born 1985), Zimbabwean cricketer
- Dali Mpofu (born 1962), South African lawyer and politician
- Elizabeth Mpofu (born 1959), Zimbabwean farmer and activist
- Mpumi Mpofu, South African Secretary of Defence
- Nkosana Mpofu (born 1988), Zimbabwean cricketer
- Obert Mpofu, Zimbabwean politician
- Sizwe Mpofu-Walsh (born 1989), South African author, musician, activist and son of Dali Mpofu
- Tafadzwa Mpofu (born 1985), Zimbabwean cricketer
- Quinton Qhawe Mpofu (born 2007), South African scholar
- Dliwe Mpofu (born 1979), Zimbabwean Police Officer
