= Tapfumaneyi =

Tapfumaneyi is a Zimbabwean masculine given name.

== List of people with the name ==
- Tapfumaneyi Jonga, Zimbabwean long-distance runner
- Tapfumaneyi Mandizha, Zimbabwean cricketer
- Tapfumaneyi Masaya, Zimbabwean bishop and political activist
- Tapfumaneyi Maurice Nyagumbo, Zimbabwean politician
