= Qaseem Khan =

Afghan cricketer (born 1993)

Personal information
- Born: 1 February 1993 (age 33); Afghanistan
- Batting: Right-handed
- Role: Wicket-keeper

Domestic team information
- Years: Team
- 2011/12: Afghan Cheetahs

Career statistics
Competition	Twenty20
Matches	3
Runs scored	2
Batting average	–
100s/50s	–/–
Top score	1*
Balls bowled	–
Wickets	–
Bowling average	–
5 wickets in innings	–
10 wickets in match	–
Best bowling	–
Catches/stumpings	2/–
- Source: Cricinfo, 6 March 2017

Qaseem Khan
Medal record

Men's Cricket

Representing Afghanistan

Asian Games
Silver medal – second place	2014 Incheon	Team

Qaseem Khan (born 1 February 1993) is an Afghan cricketer. Khan is a right-handed batsman who fields as a wicket-keeper.

Khan made his Twenty20 debut for the Afghan Cheetahs in the Faysal Bank Twenty-20 Cup against Rawalpindi Rams. He played in the Cheetahs two other fixtures in that competition, against Faisalabad Wolves and Multan Tigers. He made his first-class debut for Afghanistan against Zimbabwe A during Afghanistan's tour to Zimbabwe on 27 July 2014.
