= Mupariwa =

Mupariwa is a Zimbabwean surname that may refer to the following notable people:

- Taffy Mupariwa (born 1996), Zimbabwean cricketer
- Tawanda Mupariwa (born 1985), Zimbabwean cricketer
- Tonny Mupariwa (born 1991), Zimbabwean cricketer
