= Robert Kennedy (cricketer) =

New Zealand cricketer

Personal information
- Full name: Robert John Kennedy
- Born: 3 June 1972 (age 54); Dunedin, Otago, New Zealand
- Batting: Right-handed
- Bowling: Right-arm medium

International information
- National side: New Zealand
- Test debut (cap 198): 13 January 1996 v Zimbabwe
- Last Test: 27 April 1996 v West Indies
- ODI debut (cap 97): 31 January 1996 v Zimbabwe
- Last ODI: 6 December 1996 v Pakistan

Domestic team information
- Years: Team
- 1993/94–1997/98: Otago
- 1998/99–1999/00: Wellington

Career statistics
Competition	Test	ODI	FC	LA
Matches	4	7	38	46
Runs scored	28	17	306	126
Batting average	7.00	17.00	9.00	9.00
100s/50s	0/0	0/0	0/0	0/0
Top score	22	8*	31	20*
Balls bowled	636	312	5,772	2,427
Wickets	6	5	91	58
Bowling average	63.33	56.60	31.02	32.67
5 wickets in innings	0	0	1	0
10 wickets in match	0	0	0	0
Best bowling	3/28	2/36	6/61	4/29
Catches/stumpings	2/–	1/–	14/–	13/–
- Source: Cricinfo, 4 May 2017

Robert John Kennedy (born 3 June 1972) is a former New Zealand cricketer who played in four Test matches and seven One Day Internationals for New Zealand in 1996.

== Biography ==
Kennedy was born at Dunedin in 1972 and was educated at Otago Boys' High School in the city. In late-1991 he was invited to a clinic at the Lifespan New Zealand Cricket Academy for bowling coaching and development alongside other promising players aged from 16 to 19 years. He attended the same event in 1992. After playing age-group cricket for the province, he made his senior representative debut for Otago during the 1993–94 season.

A tall fast bowler, Kennedy's ability to "bowl line and length" and to get the ball to move both into and away from the batsman saw him selected for New Zealand Academy matches during the 1995–96 season and he was selected for the Test team to play against the touring Zimbabweans in January 1996. His best international figures of 3/28 came on Test debut, and although he was selected in the 1996 Cricket World Cup squad, Wisden considered that he "seemed out of his depth for much of the international season". He toured the West Indies with New Zealand later in the year, playing in both of the Test matches on the tour, and played in two of the three ODIs on the tour of Pakistan at the end of the year, but fell out of the side and made all 11 of his international appearances during 1996.

Kennedy moved to play for Wellington ahead of the 1998–99 season, playing in the capital for two seasons. He missed the next two first-class seasons because of a shoulder injury. He continued playing as a batsman in club cricket for Upper Hutt. When the injury passed he was earmarked by Wellington coach Vaughn Johnson as a candidate to fill the death overs bowling role after Paul Hitchcock suffered an injury ahead of the 2002–03 season. He did not play any matches that season and subsequently "drifted out of the game".
