= Zimbabwean cricket team in New Zealand in 1995–96 =

International cricket tour

The Zimbabwe national cricket team toured New Zealand in January and February 1996 and played a two-match Test series against the New Zealand national cricket team followed by three Limited Overs Internationals (LOI). Both Test matches were drawn. New Zealand were captained by Lee Germon and Zimbabwe by Andy Flower. New Zealand won the LOI series 2–1.

== Test series summary ==
=== First Test ===
13–17 January 1996
(5–day match)
Scorecard

New Zealand	v	Zimbabwe
230/8d (80 overs); SP Fleming 49 (70); HH Streak 4/52 (25 overs)		196 (74.5 overs); GJ Whittall 54 (163); CL Cairns 4/56 (24 overs)
222/5d (75 overs); AC Parore 84* (177); BC Strang 1/19 (5 overs)		208/6 (61 overs); GW Flower 59 (91); RG Twose 2/36 (13 overs)

Match drawn
Trust Bank Park, Hamilton
Umpires: LH Barker (WI) and DM Quested (NZ)
Player of the match: CL Cairns (NZ)

- Zimbabwe won the toss and elected to field.
- GI Allott, NJ Astle, RJ Kennedy and GR Loveridge (all NZ) made their Test debuts.

=== Second Test ===
20–24 January 1996
(5–day match)
Scorecard

New Zealand	v	Zimbabwe
251 (95.3 overs); SP Fleming 84 (173); HH Streak 3/50 (22 overs)		326 (110 overs); DL Houghton 104 retired hurt (204); GI Allott 3/56 (23 overs)
441/5d (133 overs); CL Cairns 120 (96); HH Streak 4/110 (30 overs)		246/4 (100 overs); GW Flower 71 (202); DN Patel 2/60 (27 overs)

Match drawn
Eden Park, Auckland
Umpires: DB Cowie (NZ) and Mahboob Shah (PAK)
Player of the match: CL Cairns (NZ)

- New Zealand won the toss and elected to bat.

== One Day Internationals (ODIs) ==
New Zealand won the series 2-1.

=== 1st ODI ===
28 January 1996
Scorecard

New Zealand; 278/5 (50 overs)	v	Zimbabwe; 204 (43.5 overs)
NJ Astle 120 (137); HH Streak 1/32 (10 overs)		GJ Whittall 70 (73); SA Thomson 3/32 (10 overs)

New Zealand won by 74 runs
Eden Park, Auckland
Umpires: BF Bowden and RS Dunne
Player of the match: NJ Astle (NZ)

- New Zealand won the toss and elected to bat.
- SG Davies (ZIM) made his ODI debut.

=== 2nd ODI ===
31 January 1996
Scorecard

Zimbabwe; 181/9 (50 overs)	v	New Zealand; 184/4 (39.3 overs)
GW Flower 48 (90); DJ Nash 3/30 (10 overs)		SP Fleming 70 (101); HH Streak 2/44 (10 overs)

New Zealand won by 6 wickets
Basin Reserve, Wellington
Umpires: DB Cowie and CE King
Player of the match: SP Fleming (NZ)

- Zimbabwe won the toss and elected to bat.
- RJ Kennedy (NZ) and ACI Lock (ZIM) made their ODI debuts.

=== 3rd ODI ===
3 February 1996 (D/N)
Scorecard

Zimbabwe; 267/7 (50 overs)	v	New Zealand; 246 (48.1 overs)
A Flower 57 (67); DK Morrison 3/39 (10 overs)		RG Twose 60 (95); ACI Lock 5/44 (8.1 overs)

Zimbabwe won by 21 runs
McLean Park, Napier
Umpires: RS Dunne and DM Quested
Player of the match: A Flower (ZIM)

- New Zealand won the toss and elected to field.
