= Masvingo cricket team =

Masvingo
Team information
- Home ground: Masvingo Sports Club

The Masvingo cricket team was a cricket team representing the Masvingo province of Zimbabwe. They competed in the Faithwear Clothing Inter-Provincial Competition in 2006, Zimbabwe's List A cricket tournament. Masvingo were originally meant to compete in the 2005–06 Logan Cup, but the competition was cancelled.

== Captains ==
List of Masvingo captains

== Records ==
Highest team total: 214/7 vs. Mashonaland, 3 February 2006, at Country Club, Harare
Lowest team total: 88/5 vs. Manicaland, 2 February 2006, at Country Club, Harare
Most runs: 73, Alister Maregwede
Highest score: 61, Alister Maregwede, vs. Mashonaland, 3 February 2006, at Country Club, Harare
Most wickets: 5, Tafadzwa Kamungozi
Best bowling:
