= Day/night cricket =

Cricket that is played totally or partially in the evening

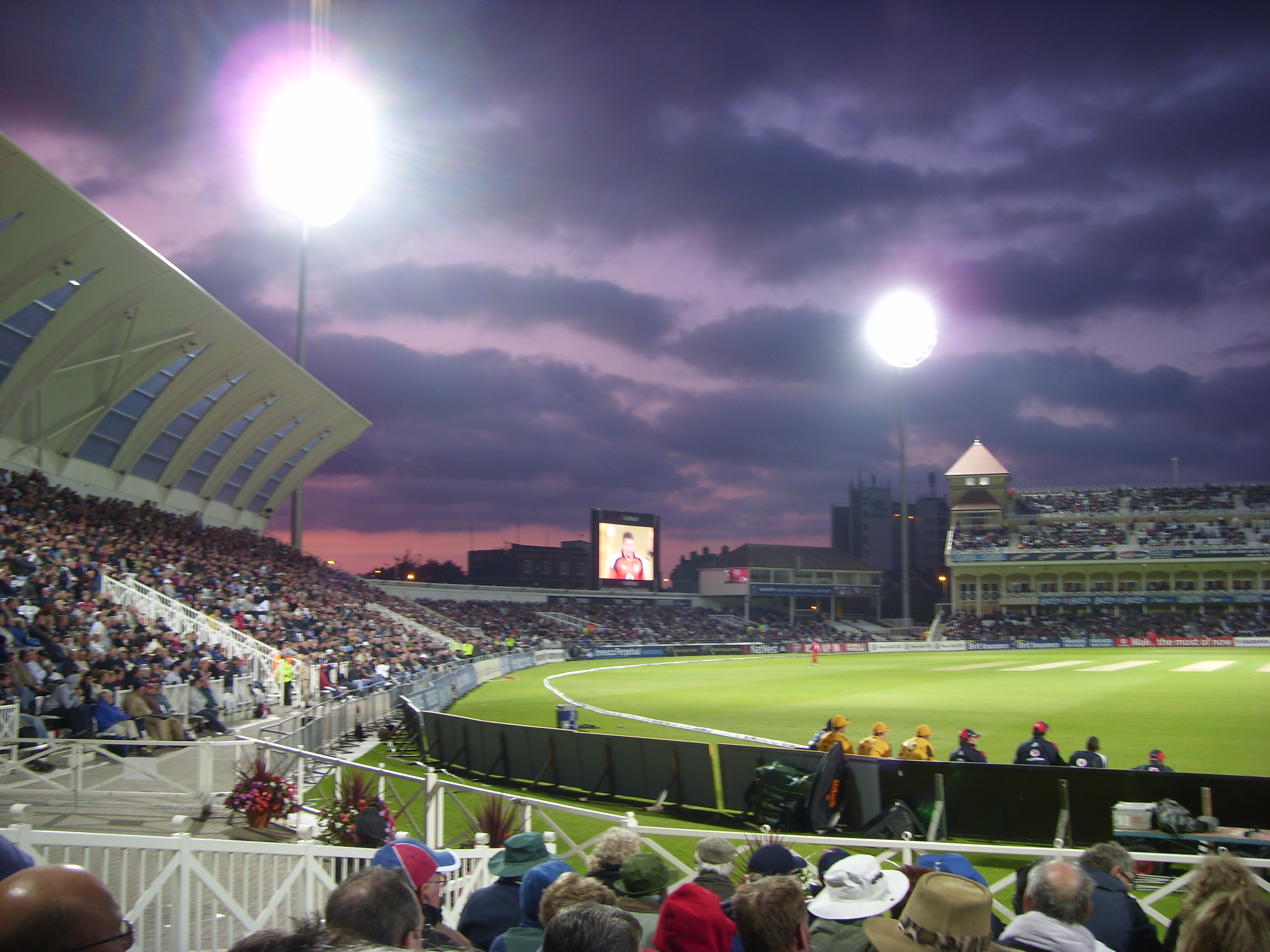
Day/night match at Trent Bridge

Day/night cricket, also known as floodlit cricket, is a cricket match that is played either totally or partially under floodlights in the evening. The first regular cricket to be played under floodlights occurred during World Series Cricket, unsanctioned by the International Cricket Council (ICC), attracting large crowds to see some of the world's best players compete in Australia and the West Indies. In 1979, when the ICC and World Series Cricket came to an understanding, the first floodlit One Day International was played, also in Australia. Floodlit cricket has since been played around the world, although England was slow to take it up due to their climate. Floodlit first-class cricket was first played in 1994, when the concept was tried during Australia's Sheffield Shield series. Day/night cricket is now commonplace in one-day cricket and Twenty20 cricket. For instance, all 27 matches in the 2014 ICC World Twenty20 were day/night matches, as were most matches in the 2011 Cricket World Cup.

In October 2012, the International Cricket Council recast the playing conditions for Test matches, permitting day/night Test matches. The first day/night Test Match took place between Australia and New Zealand at the Adelaide Oval, Adelaide on 27 November 2015, 36 years to the day from the first ICC-sanctioned day/night match.

== History ==
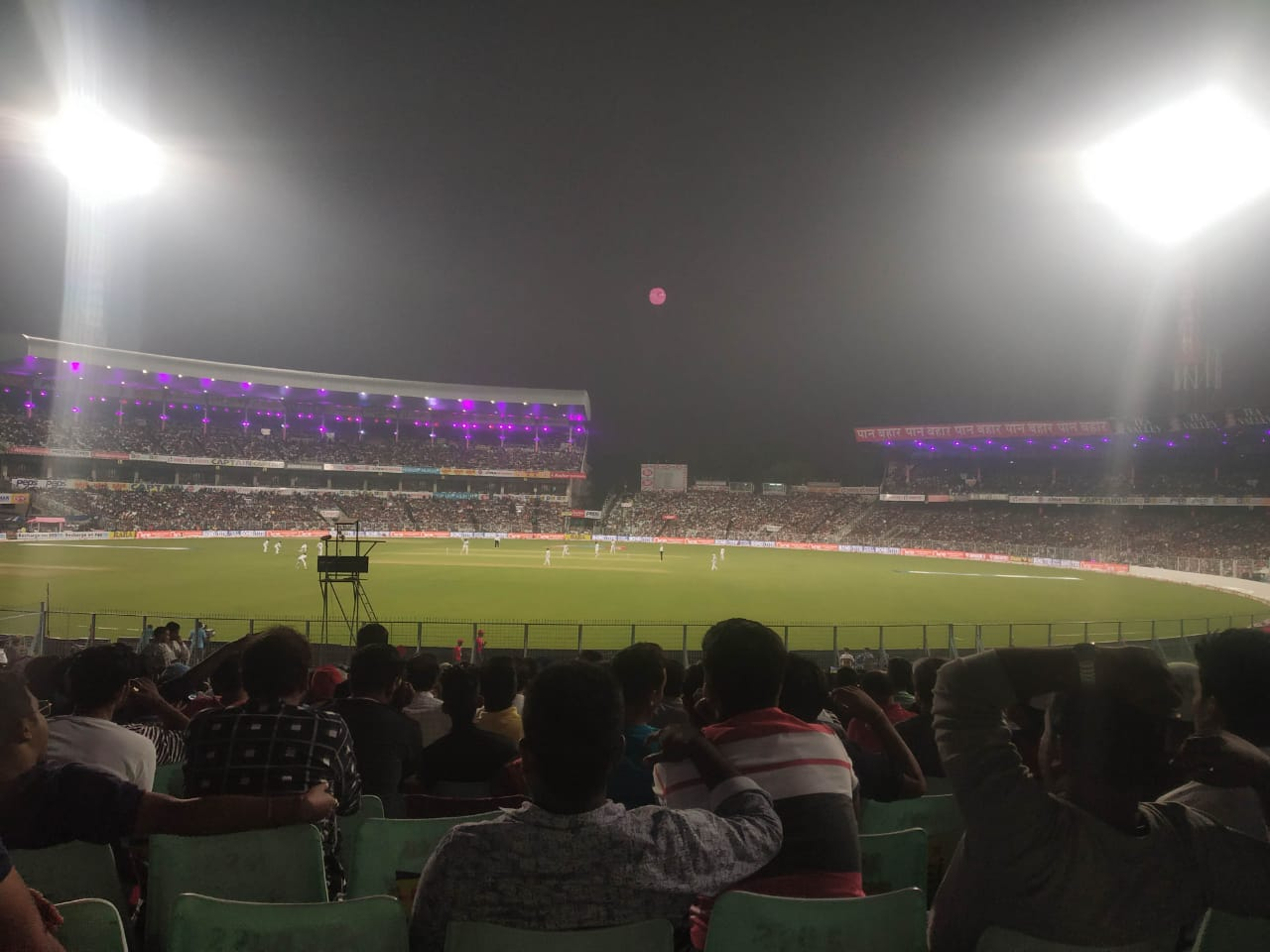
The crowd at Eden Gardens on the first day of the first day/night Test match in India.

Although the idea was born in the western Adelaide suburb of Cowandilla in the 1930s, which led to an 11 team electric light cricket competition, it is believed that the first match played under floodlights in England was on 11 August 1952, between Middlesex County Cricket Club and Arsenal Football Club. The match was a benefit for Jack Young, and was not the first benefit match held between the two sides. Floodlights at Arsenal Stadium had been installed in the summer of 1951, and were first used for football in October 1951. The cricket match took place at 19:30, the lights were turned on towards the end of the first innings, in which Arsenal were batting. A public announcement was made, advising spectators (of which there were just over 7,000) to "Keep your eye on the ball, when you see it coming keep low. The batsmen will try to keep it down, but they can't promise." The match was televised on the BBC, with over a million viewers tuning in to watch the spectacle. The Times was not convinced of the success of floodlights in cricket, mischievously asking: "What is to prevent non-stop Test matches where the last wicket falls as the milkman arrives?"

It appeared that the cricketing world concurred with The Times that playing cricket under floodlights was not a viable concept, and for over twenty years Jack Young's benefit remained a one-off. However, in 1977, when Kerry Packer bought over 50 of the world's leading cricketers to play in his World Series Cricket, the concept came to the fore. After initial attendances at the matches were low, Packer moved from so called "Supertests" to one-day cricket, generally played under floodlights. Only about 2,000 people had attended the Supertests between Australia and the West Indies at the Australian rules football stadium, VFL Park in Melbourne in November 1977. A year later – almost to the day, 44,377 people were inside the Sydney Cricket Ground to watch a floodlit one-day match between the same sides. Opposition to World Series Cricket was large, and the matches had neither Test cricket nor first-class cricket status. In 1979 an agreement between the Australian Cricket Board and Kerry Packer brought World Series Cricket to an end. The marketing potential of floodlit cricket had been noticed though, and the first floodlit One Day International was contested in November 1979 between the official cricket teams of Australia and the West Indies.

Floodlit cricket was soon taking place not only in Australia, but also in South Africa, West Indies and South Asia. In England, opposition remained firm; not only was there lingering hostility towards Packer's World Series Cricket, but the differences in climate made the application difficult. In contrast to Australia and South Africa, where twilight is minimal, and the light fades quickly, the long English evenings meant that the floodlights would be required only for the last hour or so of a match. The increased chance of rain also meant that the members of the England and Wales Cricket Board (ECB) were loath to spend money on permanent lights, when rain would stop play anyway.

=== Day/night first-class matches ===
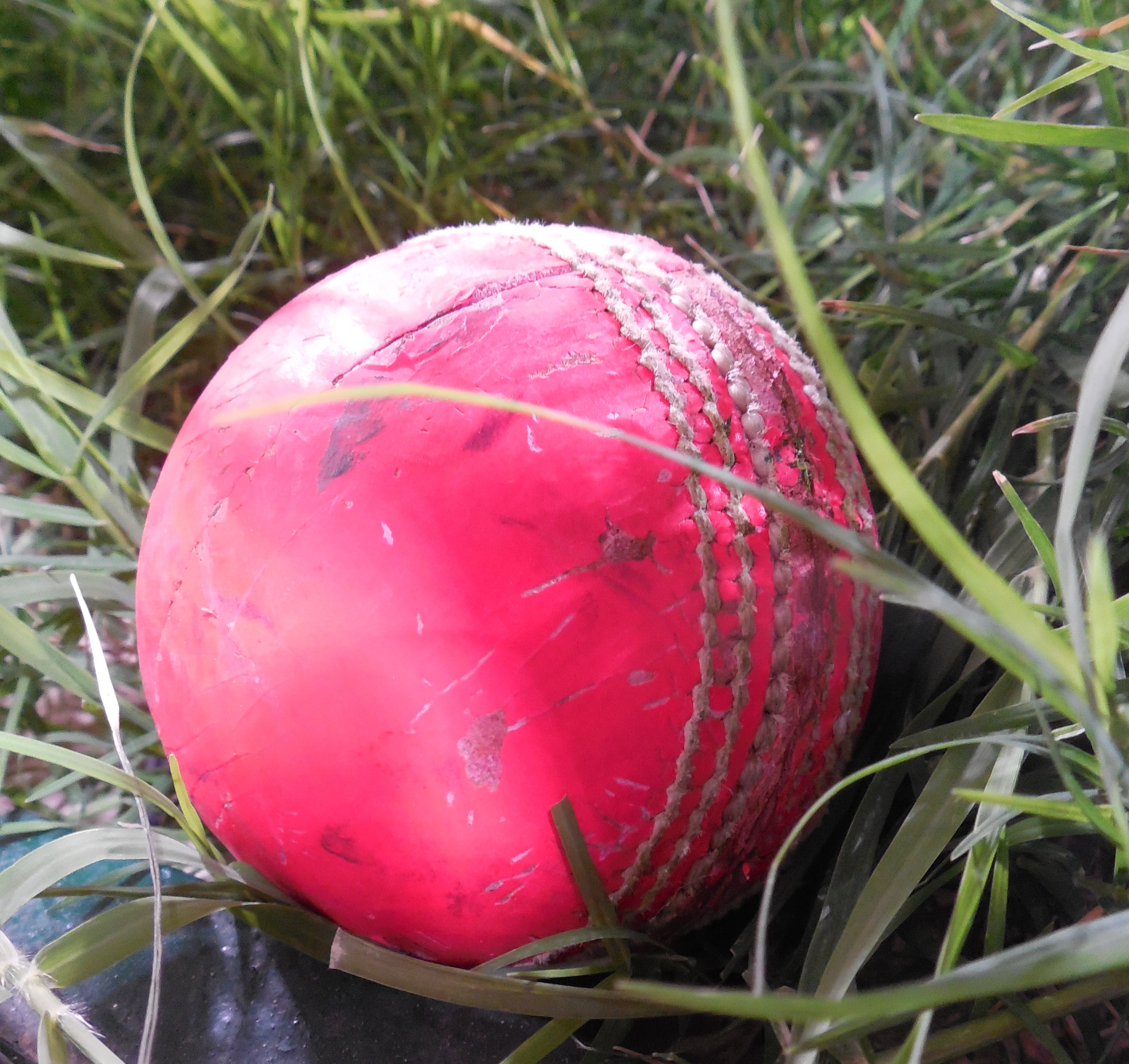
A used pink ball

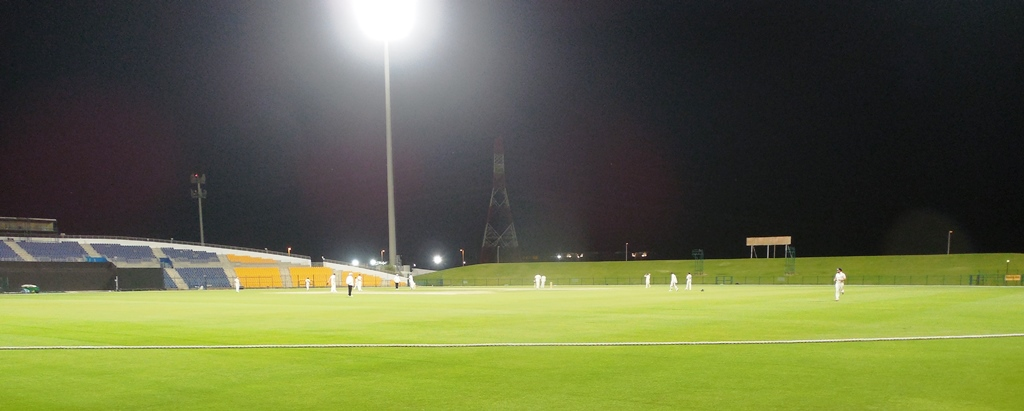
A day/night first-class game

During the late 2000s, discussions regarding the possibility of playing day/night Test matches occurred. In the West Indies, the first floodlit first-class cricket match in which the teams used a pink ball, was played between Guyana and Trinidad and Tobago. The viability of using a pink ball was also tried out by Cricket Australia and some Indian Premier League and Bangladesh Cricket League franchises. The annual curtain-raiser to the English cricket season in 2010 was played under floodlights in Abu Dhabi, with a mixed but generally positive reception. A year later, in 2011, the first County Championship game to be played under lights was played, between Kent and Glamorgan at St Lawrence Ground, Canterbury.

The 2013–14 Sheffield Shield season included three-day/night first-class matches with pink balls. The trials continued in 2014–15 as Cricket Australia looked to host the first day-night Test in 2015 against New Zealand. This match took place at the Adelaide Oval, Adelaide on 27 November 2015.

India's first pink ball match took place in Kolkata on 18 July 2016. It was CAB Super League Final between Bhowanipore Club and Mohan Bagan. Mohan Bagan won the match by 296 runs. The 2016 Duleep Trophy matches were played under the lights in Greater Noida. Feedback about the ball was that due to the brightness of the ball, the team handling the camera was able to track the pink ball better than the red. However, catching the ball in the deep during day-light was relatively difficult compared to the red ball. In September 2016, the BCCI confirmed that there would be no day/night Tests in India during the 2016–17 season. Incidentally, the first day-night first-class match in India was held much earlier: in April 1997, the Ranji trophy final between Delhi and Mumbai was played at Gwalior under lights. A pink ball was not used, with play carried for five days using a white ball.

The second day/night Test took place between Pakistan and the West Indies on 13–17 October 2016. In October 2016 the England and Wales Cricket Board (ECB) confirmed that the first Test between England and the West Indies in August 2017 would be played as a day/night game.

Australia played two day/night Tests in their home summer of 2016/17: one against South Africa at Adelaide and one against Pakistan at Brisbane.

On 7 March 2017, Cricket Australia confirmed that the first day/night women's Test would be played between Australia and England. This was the sole Test of the 2017–18 Women's Ashes series and was played at the North Sydney Oval.

== First international day/night matches by host country ==
=== Men's ===
No.	Date	Host	Away team(s)	Venue	Result
1	27 November 1979	Australia	West Indies	Sydney Cricket Ground, Sydney	Australia won by 5 wickets
2	28 September 1984	India	Australia	Jawaharlal Nehru Stadium (Delhi), Delhi	Australia won by 48 runs
3	4 September 1992	Sri Lanka	Australia	R Premadasa Stadium, Colombo	Sri Lanka won by 5 wickets
4	7 December 1992	South Africa	India	Newlands, Cape Town	South Africa won by 6 wickets
5	3 February 1996	New Zealand	Zimbabwe	McLean Park, Napier	Zimbabwe won by 21 runs
6	17 March 1996	Pakistan	Sri Lanka, Australia	Gaddafi Stadium, Lahore	Sri Lanka won by 7 wickets
7	11 December 1997	United Arab Emirates	England, India	Sharjah Cricket Stadium, Sharjah	England won by 7 runs
8	24 October 1998	Bangladesh	New Zealand, Zimbabwe	Bangabandhu National Stadium, Dhaka	New Zealand won by 5 wickets
9	6 July 2000	England	West Indies, Zimbabwe	Bristol County Ground, Bristol	England won by 6 wickets
10	10 May 2006	West Indies	Zimbabwe	Beausejour Cricket Ground, Gros Islet	West Indies won by 10 wickets
11	12 September 2006	Malaysia	Australia, West Indies	Kinrara Academy Oval, Kuala Lumpur	Australia won by 78 runs
12	9 September 2021	Oman	Papua New Guinea, United States	Al Amerat, Muscat	United States won by 134 runs

== List of day/night Tests ==
=== Men's ===
No.	Date	Home team	Away team	Venue	Result
1	27 November–1 December 2015	Australia	New Zealand	Adelaide Oval, Adelaide	Australia won by 3 wickets
2	13–17 October 2016	Pakistan	West Indies	Dubai International Cricket Stadium, Dubai	Pakistan won by 56 runs
3	24–28 November 2016	Australia	South Africa	Adelaide Oval, Adelaide	Australia won by 7 wickets
4	15–19 December 2016	Australia	Pakistan	The Gabba, Brisbane	Australia won by 39 runs
5	17–21 August 2017	England	West Indies	Edgbaston Cricket Ground, Birmingham	England won by an innings and 209 runs
6	6–10 October 2017	Pakistan	Sri Lanka	Dubai International Cricket Stadium, Dubai	Sri Lanka won by 68 runs
7	2–6 December 2017	Australia	England	Adelaide Oval, Adelaide	Australia won by 120 runs
8	26–29 December 2017	South Africa	Zimbabwe	St George's Park, Port Elizabeth	South Africa won by an innings and 120 runs
9	22–26 March 2018	New Zealand	England	Eden Park, Auckland	New Zealand won by an innings and 49 runs
10	23–27 June 2018	West Indies	Sri Lanka	Kensington Oval, Bridgetown	Sri Lanka won by 4 wickets
11	24–28 January 2019	Australia	Sri Lanka	The Gabba, Brisbane	Australia won by an innings and 40 runs
12	22–26 November 2019	India	Bangladesh	Eden Gardens, Kolkata	India won by an innings and 46 runs
13	29 November–3 December 2019	Australia	Pakistan	Adelaide Oval, Adelaide	Australia won by an innings and 48 runs
14	12–16 December 2019	Australia	New Zealand	Perth Stadium, Perth	Australia won by 296 runs
15	17–21 December 2020	Australia	India	Adelaide Oval, Adelaide	Australia won by 8 wickets
16	24–28 February 2021	India	England	Narendra Modi Stadium, Ahmedabad	India won by 10 wickets
17	16–20 December 2021	Australia	England	Adelaide Oval, Adelaide	Australia won by 275 runs
18	14–18 January 2022	Australia	England	Bellerive Oval, Hobart	Australia won by 146 runs
19	12–16 March 2022	India	Sri Lanka	M. Chinnaswamy Stadium, Bangalore	India won by 238 runs
20	8–12 December 2022	Australia	West Indies	Adelaide Oval, Adelaide	Australia won by 419 runs
21	16–20 February 2023	New Zealand	England	Bay Oval, Mount Maunganui	England won by 267 runs
22	25–29 January 2024	Australia	West Indies	The Gabba, Brisbane	West Indies won by 8 runs
23	6–10 December 2024	Australia	India	Adelaide Oval, Adelaide	Australia won by 10 wickets
24	12–16 July 2025	West Indies	Australia	Sabina Park, Kingston	Australia won by 176 runs
25	4–8 December 2025	Australia	England	The Gabba, Brisbane	Australia won by 8 wickets

=== Women's ===
No.	Date	Home team	Away team	Venue	Result
1	9–12 November 2017	Australia	England	North Sydney Oval, Sydney	Match drawn
2	30 September–3 October 2021	Australia	India	Carrara Stadium, Gold Coast, Queensland	Match drawn
3	30 January–1 February 2025	Australia	England	Melbourne Cricket Ground, Melbourne	Australia won by an innings and 122 runs
4	6–8 March 2026	Australia	India	WACA Ground, Perth	Australia won by 10 wickets
