= Zimbabwean cricket team in the West Indies in 2006 =

Zimbabwe in West Indies in 2006
	Zimbabwe	West Indies
- Dates: 29 April – 14 May 2006
Captains	Terry Duffin	Brian Lara

One Day International series
- Results: West Indies won the 7-match series 5–0
Most runs	Justice Chibhabha (162)	Ramnaresh Sarwan (254)
Most wickets	Prosper Utseya (6)	Jerome Taylor (9)
- Player of the series: Shivnarine Chanderpaul (WI)

The 2006 international cricket season started with controversial ICC members Zimbabwe touring the West Indies for a series of seven One Day International matches. Because Zimbabwe recently pulled out of playing Test matches, the tour had to be rescheduled which meant the two Test matches were turned into limited overs games, bumping them up from the original five. After Zimbabwe's decision to leave Test cricket at the start of 2006, the West Indies Cricket Board had reconsidered the tour, but without any other team to play they had to appease both sponsors and fans. Although the teams lie next to each other in the ICC ODI Championship, West Indies holds 89 points in eighth place, 47 more than the tourists' 42 in ninth.

== Schedule ==
Date	Match	Venue
April
29	1st ODI	Antigua
30	2nd ODI	Antigua
May
3	Tour match	Antigua
6	3rd ODI	Guyana
7	4th ODI	Guyana
10	5th ODI	St. Lucia
13	6th ODI	Trinidad
14	7th ODI	Trinidad

== Squads ==
Zimbabwe
- Terry Duffin c
- Charles Coventry wk
- Brendan Taylor wk
- Justice Chibhabha
- Elton Chigumbura
- Keith Dabengwa
- Ryan Higgins
- Anthony Ireland
- Blessing Mahwire
- Keegan Meth
- Tawanda Mupariwa
- Ed Rainsford
- Piet Rinke
- Vusi Sibanda
- Gregory Strydom
- Prosper Utseya
West Indies
- Brian Lara c
- Denesh Ramdin wk
- Ian Bradshaw
- Dwayne Bravo
- Shivnarine Chanderpaul
- Corey Collymore
- Fidel Edwards
- Chris Gayle
- Runako Morton
- Marlon Samuels
- Ramnaresh Sarwan
- Dwayne Smith
- Jerome Taylor

== One-Day Matches ==
=== First ODI (29 April) ===
29 April 2006
Scorecard

Zimbabwe; 151/9 (50 overs)	v	West Indies; 154/5 (38.2 overs)
CJ Chibhabha 55 (99); JE Taylor 2/19 (10 overs)		BC Lara 40* (43); P Utseya 3/35 (10 overs)

West Indies won by 5 wickets
Antigua Recreation Ground, St. John's, Antigua and Barbuda
Umpires: BF Bowden (NZ) and BR Doctrove (WI)
Player of the match: JE Taylor (WI)

- West Indies won the toss and elected to field.

Brian Lara's first match in his third spell as captain ended in victory, as Zimbabwe mustered 151 in their 50 overs, and four West Indian bowlers got two wickets each. Despite Runako Morton recording a duck, West Indies made it to the target with five wickets and 11.4 overs to spare, as Lara top scored with 40, the second highest total of the match. However, according to Cricinfo reporter Will Luke, West Indies "rarely looked in complete control". For Zimbabwe, Blessing Mahwire bowled seven overs and conceded 14 runs with six wides, while Prosper Utseya picked up a career best three for 35. In the first innings, Justice Chibhabha hit a half-century in his second ODI.

=== Second ODI (30 April) ===
30 April 2006
Scorecard

West Indies; 242/9 (50 overs)	v	Zimbabwe; 144 (46.2 overs)
RR Sarwan 55 (61); T Mupariwa 3/46 (10 overs)		CJ Chibhabha 67 (100); JE Taylor 4/24 (10 overs)

West Indies won by 98 runs
Antigua Recreation Ground, St. John's, Antigua and Barbuda
Umpires: BF Bowden (NZ) and SA Bucknor (WI)
Player of the match: JE Taylor (WI)

- West Indies won the toss and elected to bat.

Despite another half-century from Justice Chibhabha, this time worth 12 runs more than in the first ODI, Zimbabwe's total of 144 was seven lower than in the first ODI. West Indies had batted first, making 242 for 9 after Chris Gayle, Ramnaresh Sarwan and Shivnarine Chanderpaul all passed 40, while five Zimbabwean bowlers got at least one wicket each. Jerome Taylor then took four wickets as Zimbabwe fell for 144, with Elton Chigumbura (13) and Tawanda Mupariwa (16) joining Chibhabha with double figure scores.

=== Tour Match: Zimbabwe v University of West Indies Vice Chancellor's XI (3 May) ===
University of West Indies Vice Chancellor's XI won by 5 wickets

Piet Rinke hit 113 for the Zimbabweans in the 13-a-side match, and Brendan Taylor and Charles Coventry also took half-centuries. For the University of West Indies' XI, Ryan Hinds and Xavier Marshall, who had both played internationals for West Indies before, made scores of 117 not out and 54 respectively, and C. Walton anchored the chase with 67 as the hosts won with 23 balls to spare.

=== Third ODI (6 May) ===
6 May 2006
Scorecard

West Indies	v	Zimbabwe

Match abandoned
Bourda, Georgetown, Guyana
Umpires: BF Bowden (NZ) and BR Doctrove (WI)

- No toss made.
- Match called off on the 5th May.

=== Fourth ODI (7 May) ===
7 May 2006
Scorecard

West Indies; 333/6 (50 overs)	v	Zimbabwe; 251/7 (50 overs)
S Chanderpaul 93 (82); HP Rinke 1/30 (4 overs)		E Chigumbura 60 (59); FH Edwards 3/42 (10 overs)

West Indies won by 82 runs
Bourda, Georgetown, Guyana
Umpires: BF Bowden (NZ) and SA Bucknor (WI)
Player of the match: S Chanderpaul (WI)

- West Indies won the toss and elected to bat.
- S Chattergoon (WI) made his ODI debut.

West Indies sealed at least a draw in the series after a convincing 82-run victory over Zimbabwe in Georgetown. The West Indies handed a debut to 25-year-old opener Sewnarine Chattergoon but he disappointed in front of his home crowd scoring only 9. But a few players did play a part in the massive total of 333/6 set by the West Indies. Shivnarine Chanderpaul top scored with 93 off 82 balls (7 fours & 4 sixes), and there were also half-centuries from Runako Morton (79 off 90) and captain Brian Lara (56 off 45). This set Zimbabwe an unlikely 334 target, and sure enough struggled. Fidel Edwards bowled Piet Rinke with the first ball of the innings, and also took the scalp of Zimbabwean captain Terry Duffin with the 4th ball of that over, leaving Zimbabwe at one run for two wickets, but steady knocks from Justice Chibhabha, Vusi Sibanda and Elton Chigumbura got the Zimbabweans past 100. But they weren't scoring quickly enough, and after their allotted 50 overs, came up 82 runs short, with Edwards the pick of the bowlers. This was also the last international match at the Bourda ground:

=== Fifth ODI (10 May) ===
10 May 2006 (D/N)
Scorecard

Zimbabwe; 152 (49.2 overs)	v	West Indies; 156/0 (27.4 overs)
GM Strydom 48 (73); DJ Bravo 3/24 (9.2 overs)		C Gayle 95* (91)

West Indies won by 10 wickets
Beausejour Stadium, Gros Islet
Umpires: BF Bowden (NZ) and BR Doctrove (WI)
Player of the match: CH Gayle (WI)

- Zimbabwe won the toss and elected to bat.
- D Mohammed (WI) made his ODI debut.
- This was the first day-night ODI in the West Indies.

=== Sixth ODI (13 May) ===
13 May 2006
Scorecard

West Indies; 263/6 (50 overs)	v	Zimbabwe; 72/2 (12.1 overs)
RS Morton 109 (149); RS Higgins 2/39 (10 overs)		BRM Taylor 20* (21); MN Samuels 1/31 (5 overs)

No result (D/L method)
Queen's Park Oval, Port of Spain, Trinidad
Umpires: BF Bowden (NZ) and SA Bucknor (WI)

- West Indies won the toss and elected to bat.
- Zimbabwe target was 191 runs in 30 overs.

=== Seventh ODI (14 May) ===
14 May 2006
Scorecard

West Indies; 266/8 (50 overs)	v	Zimbabwe; 162 (49 overs)
RR Sarwan 91 (114); T Mupariwa 3/44 (10 overs)		BRM Taylor 43 (82); DR Smith 4/29 (8 overs)

West Indies won by 104 runs
Queen's Park Oval, Port of Spain, Trinidad
Umpires: BF Bowden (NZ) and BR Doctrove (WI)
Player of the match: RR Sarwan (WI)

- West Indies won the toss and elected to bat.

== External sources ==
- CricketArchive – itinerary of events
