= Piet Rinke =

Zimbabwean cricketer (born 1981)

Personal information
- Full name: Harry Peter Rinke
- Born: 5 November 1981 (age 45); Marondera, Zimbabwe
- Nickname: Piet
- Batting: Right-handed
- Bowling: Right-arm fast-medium

International information
- National side: Zimbabwe
- ODI debut (cap 170): 25 February 2006 v Kenya
- Last ODI: 10 October 2006 v Sri Lanka

Domestic team information
- Years: Team
- Manicaland
- Matabeleland Tuskers

Career statistics
Competition	ODI	FC	LA
Matches	18	9	38
Runs scored	317	346	940
Batting average	17.61	24.71	28.48
100s/50s	0/3	0/1	2/6
Top score	72	84*	118*
Balls bowled	277	1,328	878
Wickets	8	26	26
Bowling average	34.12	25.30	33.76
5 wickets in innings	0	2	0
10 wickets in match	0	0	0
Best bowling	2/11	6/43	3/15
Catches/stumpings	0/–	6/–	5/–
- Source: Cricinfo, 19 October 2017

Harry Peter Rinke (born 5 November 1981) is a former Zimbabwean cricketer who debuted for the international team against Kenya in 2005–06.

== International career ==
Rinke made 168 runs during the four-match series, more than any other Zimbabwean batsman, his innings of 72 in the fourth match was the highest by a Zimbabwean in the series, and he was the only Zimbabwean to make more than one half-century. Rinke's medium pace also yielded three wickets during the series. His successes against Kenya saw him picked again for the 7-ODI tour of the West Indies in April and May 2006.

Rinke last played international cricket in 2006 for Zimbabwe against Sri Lanka in the 2006 ICC Champions Trophy.

== Domestic career ==
Rinke played first class cricket for CFX Academy, Manicaland and Mashonaland before graduating to the international side, and also played five matches for Zimbabwe A against Bangladesh A during their 2003–04 tour.

After the Sri Lanka match, he left Zimbabwe and since then has played in the UK for Scarborough, in the Oxbridge Yorkshire ECB County Premier League. Often he also expressed his desire to return in Zimbabwe and play for the country.

== Coaching career ==
In October 2009, he was appointed head of the New York Cricket Academy in England. Rinke will also work as a 'full-time coach' for them. Rinke is currently linked to the Cricket Centre of Excellence at Scarborough College, as Head Pro.
