= Tatenda Manatsa =

Zimbabwean cricketer (born 1990)

Personal information
- Full name: Lovemore Tatenda Gumunyu Manatsa
- Born: May 17, 1990 (age 36); Harare, Zimbabwe
- Batting: Left-handed
- Bowling: Right-arm medium

Domestic team information
- Years: Team
- 2009/09: Northerns
- 2009/10–2014/15: Mashonaland Eagles

Career statistics
Competition	FC	LA	T20
Matches	16	14	4
Runs scored	31	25	–
Batting average	3.44	5.00	–
100s/50s	0/0	0/0	–
Top score	6*	13*	–
Balls bowled	1793	516	72
Wickets	43	12	5
Bowling average	21.83	35.00	10.40
5 wickets in innings	1	0	0
10 wickets in match	0	0	0
Best bowling	5/89	2/16	3/14
Catches/stumpings	4/0	6/0	2/0
- Source: Cricinfo, 17 January 2018

Lovemore Tatenda Gumunyu Manatsa (born 17 May 1990) is a Zimbabwean cricketer.

He made his first-class debut for Northerns in 2008/09 season. Tatenda later went on to play for Mashonaland Eagles in first-class cricket, List A cricket and T20 cricket. He made into the Zimbabwe A team for the series against Afghanistan in 2014.
