= Johannes Matigonda =

Zimbabwean cricketer (born 1984)

Personal information
- Born: 11 June 1984 (age 42); Harare, Zimbabwe
- Source: ESPNcricinfo, 24 February 2017

Johannes Matigonda (born 11 June 1984) is a Zimbabwean cricketer. He made his first-class debut for Centrals cricket team in the 2006–07 Logan Cup on 26 April 2007.
