= Ronnie Chokununga =

Zimbabwean cricketer (born 1992)

Personal information
- Born: 5 March 1992 (age 34); Mount Darwin, Zimbabwe
- Source: ESPNcricinfo, 7 September 2016

Ronnie Chokununga (born 5 March 1992) is a Zimbabwean first-class cricketer who plays for Mid West Rhinos. He made his List A debut for the Rhinos against Eagles at Harare on December 07, 2013.
