= Simbarashe Gupo =

Zimbabwean cricketer (born 1989)

Personal information
- Born: 7 July 1989 (age 37); Kadoma, Zimbabwe
- Source: ESPNcricinfo, 7 September 2016

Simbarashe Gupo (born 7 July 1989) is a Zimbabwean first-class cricketer who plays for Mashonaland Eagles.
