= New Zealand cricket team in the West Indies in 1995–96 =

International cricket tour

The New Zealand national cricket team toured the West Indies from March to May 1996 and played a two-match Test series against the West Indies cricket team which the West Indies won 1–0. New Zealand were captained by Lee Germon; the West Indies by Courtney Walsh. In addition, the teams played a five-match Limited Overs International (LOI) series which the West Indies won 3–2.

== One Day Internationals (ODIs) ==
The West Indies won the series 3-2.

=== 1st ODI ===
26 March 1996
Scorecard

New Zealand; 243 (49.1 overs)	v	West Indies; 247/9 (49.1 overs)
DN Patel 71 (58); CEL Ambrose 4/36 (10 overs)		SC Williams 62 (90); CZ Harris 3/45 (10 overs)

West Indies won by 1 wicket
Sabina Park, Kingston, Jamaica
Umpires: LH Barker and SA Bucknor
Player of the match: DN Patel (NZ)

- West Indies won the toss and elected to field.
- RD Jacobs (WI) made his ODI debut.

=== 2nd ODI ===
29 March 1996
Scorecard

West Indies; 238/7 (50 overs)	v	New Zealand; 239/6 (49.5 overs)
RIC Holder 65 (48); NJ Astle 2/32 (9 overs)		SP Fleming 106* (108); CEL Ambrose 2/42 (9.5 overs)

New Zealand won by 4 wickets
Queen's Park Oval, Port of Spain, Trinidad
Umpires: LH Barker and SA Bucknor
Player of the match: SP Fleming (NZ)

- New Zealand won the toss and elected to field.

=== 3rd ODI ===
30 March 1996
Scorecard

New Zealand; 219/8 (50 overs)	v	West Indies; 225/3 (45.4 overs)
RG Twose 48 (70); RA Harper 2/45 (10 overs)		BC Lara 146* (134); GR Larsen 3/26 (8.4 overs)

West Indies won by 7 wickets
Queen's Park Oval, Port of Spain, Trinidad
Umpires: LH Barker and SA Bucknor
Player of the match: BC Lara (WI)

- New Zealand won the toss and elected to bat.
- LR Williams (WI) made his ODI debut.

=== 4th ODI ===
3 April 1996
Scorecard

New Zealand; 158 (35.5 overs)	v	West Indies₨ 154 (49.1 overs)
CM Spearman 41 (39); LR Williams 3/16 (4.5 overs)		RIC Holder 49* (86); CL Cairns 2/17 (5.1 overs)

New Zealand won by 4 runs
Bourda, Georgetown, Guyana
Umpires: CR Duncan and EA Nicholls
Player of the match: New Zealand team₨

- West Indies won the toss and elected to field.

=== 5th ODI ===
6 April 1996
Scorecard

New Zealand; 241/8 (50 overs)	v	West Indies; 242/3 (48.3 overs)
SP Fleming 75 (102); JC Adams 3/50 (10 overs)		BC Lara 104 (103); DN Patel 1/46 (10 overs)

West Indies won by 7 wickets
Arnos Vale Stadium, Kingstown, St. Vincent and the Grenadines
Umpires: LH Barker and BEW Morgan
Player of the match: PV Simmons (WI)

- West Indies won the toss and elected to field.

== Test series summary ==
=== First Test ===
19–23 April 1996
(5–day match)
Scorecard

New Zealand	v	West Indies
195 (62 overs); AC Parore 59 (112); JC Adams 5/17 (9 overs)		472 (164.3 overs); SL Campbell 208 (470); GR Larsen 3/76 (40 overs)
305 (82 overs); NJ Astle 125 (150); IR Bishop 4/67 (19 overs)		29/0 (4 overs); SL Campbell 29* (21)

West Indies won by 10 wickets
Kensington Oval, Bridgetown, Barbados
Umpires: SA Bucknor (WI) and P Willey (ENG)
Player of the match: SL Campbell (WI)

- West Indies won the toss and elected to field.
- 22 April was taken as a rest day.
- The match was scheduled for five days but completed in four.
- RG Samuels and PIC Thompson (both WI) made their Test debuts.

=== Second Test ===
27 April–2 May 1996
(5–day match)
Scorecard

West Indies	v	New Zealand
548/7d (166 overs); JC Adams 208* (333); CZ Harris 2/83 (35 overs)		437 (144.3 overs); NJ Astle 103 (165); CEL Ambrose 5/68 (32 overs)
184 (61.3 overs); BC Lara 74 (119); DK Morrison 5/61 (20 overs)		130/5 (65 overs); SP Fleming 56 (172); CEL Ambrose 2/22 (12 overs)

Match drawn
Antigua Recreation Ground, St. John's, Antigua
Umpires: LH Barker (WI) and CJ Mitchley (SA)
Player of the match: JC Adams (WI)

- New Zealand won the toss and elected to field.
- 30 April was taken as a rest day.
- This Test set a record for the highest match aggregate (1299 runs) without a bye being scored.
