= Walter Chawaguta =

Zimbabwean cricketer and coach (born 1972)

Personal information
- Born: 23 October 1972 (age 54); Alberton, South Africa

Head coaching information
- Years: Team
- 2008–2010: Zimbabwe
- 2023-: Zimbabwe (interim)
- Source: ESPNcricinfo, 24 February 2017

Walter Chawaguta (born 23 October 1972) is a Zimbabwean cricket coach and former player. He was the head coach of the Zimbabwe national cricket team from 2008 to 2010.

== Personal life ==
Chawaguta was born on 23 October 1972 in Alberton, South Africa. He was educated at Prince Edward School in Harare.

== Playing career ==
Chawaguta played a single game of first-class cricket for Mashonaland during the 1997–98 season. He was also a member of the Takashinga Cricket Club, playing as a right-handed middle-order batsman. He resumed his playing career in the 2006–07 Logan Cup, playing five games for Centrals.

== Coaching career ==
Chawaguta took up coaching at a young age, initially with Churchill School in Harare. He later coached Zimbabwe A and Zimbabwe under-19s for periods. He was a national selector in 2004 and unsuccessful interviewed for the head coaching job in 2005. In August 2007 Chawaguta was appointed as assistant coach of the national team under Robin Brown. He succeeded Brown as head coach in August 2008.

Chawaguta's appointment as head coach came in the context of the Zimbabwean cricket crisis, with the country struggling to attract more experienced overseas coaches. The head coaching position was advertised in early 2009 but failed to attract any applicants. Chawaguta was ultimately replaced by Englishman Alan Butcher in January 2010.

In 2015, Chawaguta was reappointed to the national selection panel.
