= Admire Manyumwa =

Zimbabwean cricketer (born 1987)

Admire Marvellous Manyumwa
Personal information
- Born: 28 December 1987 (age 38); Chitungwiza, Mashonaland
- Batting: Right-handed
- Bowling: Right-arm medium
- Source: Cricinfo, 8 June 2018

Admire Manyumwa (born 28 December 1987) is a Zimbabwean cricketer. He played the different formats of First-class cricket, List A cricket and T20 from 2006 to 2015.
