= Mark Mbofana =

Zimbabwean cricketer (born 1989)

Personal information
- Born: 25 March 1989 (age 37); Harare, Zimbabwe
- Source: ESPNcricinfo, 7 September 2016

Mark Mbofana (born 25 March 1989) is a Zimbabwean first-class cricketer who played for Mid West Rhinos. He played in 36 first-class and 38 List A matches between 2009 and 2018.
