= Electric light cricket =

- Highest governing body: South Australian Electric Light Cricket Association (defunct)
- First played: 1930, Cowandilla, South Australia

Characteristics
- Contact: No
- Team members: 10-18 players per side
- Mixed-sex: No, separate competitions
- Type: Team sport, Bat-and-Ball
- Equipment: Cricket bat, Wicket (Stumps, Bails), Tennis ball

Presence
- Country or region: South Australia
- Obsolete: Yes

Electric light cricket is an obsolete variant of cricket invented in Cowandilla, South Australia in 1930 by members of the Hilton sub-branch of the Returned and Services League.

The game was played both indoors and outdoors by two teams of 10 to 18 players. Games were played under a string of lights suspended above the playing surface, allowing for nighttime play.

== History ==
Electric light cricket was first played by members of the Hilton RSF sub-branch at the home of Alf Stone in Cowandilla, a western suburb of Adelaide, in 1930. By 1933, eight local RSL sub-branches, including Hilton, joined to form an RSL league.

Mixed-gender matches were played, with a women's team winning a mixed-gender match 352-327 in March 1936. The first women's premiership was contested in 1938.

By 1949, 7,000 players were members of electric light cricket clubs in South Australia. Attempts to grow the game into Victoria were numerous, but unsuccessful.

Following the invention and standardization of indoor cricket in the 1980s, electric light cricket saw a steep decline in popularity. While attempts were made to revitalize interest in the game, the final electric light cricket match was played at Blue Gum Park in 2006.

Notable players included Gil Langley, Laurie Taylor, and Don Taylor.

== Rules ==
The rules of electric light cricket were first set down by Alf Stone in 1930 and standardized at a 1939 meeting presided over by Eric Millhouse. Standard cricket equipment was used with the exception of the cricket ball, which was replaced by a white tennis ball.

Electric light cricket was played on a rectangular court measuring 60 feet (18.3 m) by 50 feet (15.2 m) bounded by a wire fence between 5 and 12 feet (1.5 to 3.6 m) high. A line marked 10 feet (3 m) from the fence on three sides of the court deliniated the "inner boundary." The stumps were set 40 feet apart. The pitch was marked as an 18-foot by 5-foot (5.5 m by 1.5 m) area in front of the popping crease at the batter's end. The bowler's crease would be marked as a four-foot area in front of the stumps at the bowler's end.

The game was played by two teams of 10 to 18 players. All players on each team were required to bat and bowl. Each player would bowl a 12-ball over in the order in which their name appeared on the scoreboard. The ball was bowled underarm and the bowler was required to keep at least one foot behind the bowling crease during their delivery. The umpire would call a no-ball if the ball was delivered too fast, pitched off the wicket, or rose more than six feet above the ground during its flight.

Unlike traditional cricket, only one member of the batting team would be batting at any one time. Batters would remain at the crease for the entirety of their time at bat. Runs were scored by hitting to ball into specific areas around the court. A ball hit the boundary fence scored four runs. A ball stopped by a fielder before reaching the fence after crossing the inner boundary scored two runs. No-balls counted as one run to the batter. In many associations, batters were forced to retire after scoring 100 runs, but this was not universally enforced.

Even with the high number of fielders, scores were often extremely high, with combined run totals occasionally approaching 1,000. However, impressive bowling figures could also be achieved, with a women's player picking up seven wickets while allowing eight runs in a single 12-ball over.

In addition to being given out for hitting the ball over the fence on the full, the standard methods of dismissing batters were used. However, in order to be given out leg before wicket, two successful appeals were required.

Innings often carried a time limit, with restrictions of 60 to 75 minutes being common.
