= Kudakwashe Bhasikoro =

Zimbabwean cricketer (born 1989)

Personal information
- Full name: Kudakwashe Denga Bhasikoro
- Born: August 1, 1989 (age 37); Shamva, Zimbabwe
- Batting: Right-handed
- Bowling: Left-arm slow

Domestic team information
- Years: Team
- Mid West Rhinos

Career statistics
| Competition | First-class | List A |
|---|---|---|
| Matches | 5 | 2 |
| Runs scored | 49 | 38 |
| Batting average | 12.25 | 38.00 |
| 100s/50s | 0/0 | 0/0 |
| Top score | 38 | 24 |
| Balls bowled | 435 | 116 |
| Wickets | 12 | 5 |
| Bowling average | 17.75 | 16.40 |
| 5 wickets in innings | 1 | 1 |
| 10 wickets in match | 0 | 0 |
| Best bowling | 5/37 | 5/17 |
| Catches/stumpings | 4/– | 1/– |
- Source: Cricinfo, 25 January 2018

Kudakwashe Denga Bhasikoro (born 1 August 1989) is a Zimbabwean first-class cricketer. He plays for Mid West Rhinos in first-class cricket matches.

Kudakwashe made his first-class cricket debut for the Rhinos against Southern Rocks in 2014. He also made his List A debut for Mid West Rhinos against Mashonaland Eagles in 2014.
