= Bradley Wadlan =

Welsh cricketer

Personal information
- Full name: Bradley Lewis Wadlan
- Born: 14 December 1988 (age 37); Bridgend, Glamorgan, Wales
- Batting: Left-handed
- Bowling: Slow left-arm orthodox

Domestic team information
- Years: Team
- 2007–2010: Wales Minor Counties
- 2011–2014: Herefordshire
- 2011–2013: Unicorns
- 2013/14–2014/15: Mid West Rhinos
- 2015–2017: Cornwall
- 2017/18: Midlands Rhinos
- 2018: Wales Minor Counties

Career statistics
Competition	First-class	List A
Matches	15	22
Runs scored	813	364
Batting average	31.26	19.15
100s/50s	–/6	–/2
Top score	77	78*
Balls bowled	2,543	828
Wickets	67	20
Bowling average	18.98	28.75
5 wickets in innings	3	–
10 wickets in match	2	–
Best bowling	7/30	3/24
Catches/stumpings	5/–	6/–
- Source: Cricinfo, 25 September 2020

Bradley Lewis Wadlan (born 14 December 1988) is a Welsh cricketer. Wadlan is a left-handed batsman who bowls slow left-arm orthodox. He was born in Bridgend, Glamorgan.

Wadlan made his debut in county cricket for Wales Minor Counties against Cornwall in the 2007 MCCA Knockout Trophy where he took 4/16. He played Minor counties cricket for Wales Minor Counties from 2007 to 2010, making four Minor Counties Championship and 4 MCCA Knockout Trophy appearances. For the 2011 season he joined Herefordshire, who he made his debut for against Hertfordshire in the MCCA Knockout Trophy. He struck 59 runs off 41 balls in Herefords QF MCCA Knockout Trophy match against Cumberland. On Championship debut against Cheshire, he scored 32 in the first innings followed by 52 off 32 balls in the second innings.

During the 2011 season, Wadlan was selected to play for the Unicorns to play in their Clydesdale Bank 40 fixture against Somerset, in doing so making his List A debut. He wasn't required to bat in the Unicorns innings, while with the ball he dismissed Marcus Trescothick after the former England batsman had made 53, he followed this up later by dismissing Peter Trego for 12, therefore finishing with figures of 2/39 from 8 overs. He made a further appearance in that competition against Glamorgan at Wormsley Park.

2012 saw Wadlan play in nine of the eleven Clydesdale Bank 40 fixtures. He also played for Hereford against Shropshire at Colwall in the Minor Counties Championship making an unbeaten 63 not out.

2013 Wadlan averaged 49.5 in the MCCA Knockout Trophy with scores of 59 and 127 against Northumberland and current holders Cumberland. His bowling also was valuable picking up 10 wickets in the comp at an average of just 16.

Playing against Middlesex at Southend in the Yorkshire Bank 40 was reward for some good one day performances for both Herefordshire and Unicorns A. This was his last List A game to date.

Career best figures for Herefordshire in the Championship followed during the visit of Devon taking 7/121 in the first innings and 4/77 in the second for match figures of 11/198.

A past student of Cardiff University, Wadlan has also played for the Glamorgan Second XI and Worcestershire Second XI. British universities / Combined universities.
