= 2009–10 Zimbabwean cricket season =

The 2009–10 Zimbabwean cricket season consists of international matches played by the Zimbabwe national cricket team as well as Zimbabwean domestic cricket matches under the auspices of Zimbabwe Cricket.

Having been suspended from Test cricket since 2005, Zimbabwe entered the 2009–10 ICC Intercontinental Cup, a first-class cricket competition competed for by the leading non-Test nations. They drew their first match of the competition against Afghanistan, before beating Kenya in their second. In One Day International cricket, Zimbabwe competed in four series, beating Kenya at home, but losing all three series away from home, against Bangladesh, South Africa and the West Indies.

Domestically, a new five-team franchise system was introduced upon the recommendation of the International Cricket Council (ICC). The Logan Cup was won by the Mashonaland Eagles, while both one-day competitions were won by the Mountaineers.

== International cricket ==
=== 2009–10 ICC Intercontinental Cup ===
Due to their suspension from Test cricket, in place since 2005, Zimbabwe approached the International Cricket Council (ICC) with a proposal to enter a team into the 2009–10 ICC Intercontinental Cup. The competition brings together the leading non-Test cricketing nations, playing each other in four-day first-class fixtures. The two leading teams then contest a final to determine the competition winner. A number of difficulties were admitted by both Zimbabwe Cricket and the ICC. Prominent among these was that a number of the countries already scheduled to take part in the competition "still have serious political reservations over travelling to, and hosting, Zimbabwe." Other issues included whether the competition format would need to be altered to accommodate Zimbabwe, and that it meant in essence that Zimbabwe were admitting they were at a lower level than their Full Member status of the ICC indicated.

The idea was given support from the governing bodies of cricket in Ireland, Scotland and Canada, with the chief executive of Cricket Scotland, Roddy Smith, summing up the mood, "it will give the Associates a chance to play a Full Member whilst giving Zimbabwe competitive cricket." A re-formatting of the Intercontinental Cup took place, and Zimbabwe joined the top division of the competition, into which they elected to enter an 'A' team, Ozias Bvute, Zimbabwe Cricket's chief executive explaining that "it was a chance to give up-and-coming and fringe players exposure to four-day cricket which they would otherwise not get."

==== First match: Afghanistan ====
16–19 August 2009
Scorecard

Zimbabwe XI	v	Afghanistan
350 (81.5 overs); Tatenda Taibu 172 (211); Mohammad Nabi 3/90 (28.5 overs)		427 (130.1 overs); Noor Ali 130 (200); Timycen Maruma 5/106 (36 overs)
446/9 (dec.) (113.5 overs); Tatenda Taibu 120 (195); Shapoor Zadran 2/42 (10 overs)		211/4 (44.5 overs); Noor Ali 100* (134); Forster Mutizwa 2/18 (3.5 overs)

Match Drawn
Mutare Sports Club, Mutare, Zimbabwe
Umpires: Jeff Luck (Nam) & Justice Tapfumaneyi (Zim)

- Points: Afghanistan 9, Zimbabwe 3

==== Second match: Kenya ====
7–10 October 2009
Scorecard

Kenya	v	Zimbabwe XI
333 (92.3 overs); Steve Tikolo 61 (96); Timycen Maruma 3/82 (24 overs)		352 (103.5 overs); Vusi Sibanda 209 (320); Thomas Odoyo 3/38 (19 overs)
254 (74.3 overs); Morris Ouma 54 (115); Ed Rainsford 3/39 (13 overs)		238/5 (62.5 overs); Vusi Sibanda 116* (172); Thomas Odoyo 1/18 (6 overs)

Zimbabwe XI won by 5 wickets
Kwekwe Sports Club, Kwekwe, Zimbabwe
Umpires: Owen Chirombe (Zim) & Nadir Shah (Ban)

- Points: Zimbabwe XI 20, Kenya 0

=== One Day Internationals ===
==== Hosting Kenya ====
After the conclusion of the Intercontinental Cup tie between Zimbabwe XI and Kenya, the touring Kenyans remained in Zimbabwe to contest five One Day Internationals (ODIs) against the host nation. The series came on the back of comments from within Zimbabwean cricket that the country could make a return to Test cricket in the following years, former national captain Alistair Campbell specifying "two or three years" when speaking to BBC World Service earlier in 2009. In their preview of the series, Cricinfo was less positive, describing the series as "a battle between two sides firmly entrenched in the lower levels of one-day international cricket."

Zimbabwe won the five match series 4–1, winning heavily in three of their four victories. The hosts batted first in the opening match, reaching 313 largely due to a career-best score of 156 from Hamilton Masakadza. In reply, Kenya did not form any significant partnerships due to the Zimbabweans bowlers taking regular wickets. Steve Tikolo performed best for the tourists, reaching 49, but they were all out for 222, 91 runs short of Zimbabwe. Zimbabwe batted first again in the second ODI, reaching 263 off their 50 overs, due to an unbeaten 71 from Stuart Matsikenyeri, and 66 from Masakadza. Kenya started well in their reply, with David Obuya scoring rapidly, but he dismissed for 49 by Graeme Cremer, who took his best figures in an ODI, finishing with six wickets. Kenya lost all ten wickets for 177, granting Zimbabwe an 86 run victory.

Kenya won the third match, avoiding a series whitewash with a 20 run victory. Batting first for the first time in the series, they reached 266, with David Obuya and Alex Obanda both passing 50. Ray Price bowled economically for the hosts, conceding 22 runs in his nine overs, but Zimbabwe's reply was shaken early on when Mark Vermeulen and Charles Coventry were both dismissed cheaply. A middle-order partnership between Brendan Taylor and Matsikenyeri looked likely to give Zimbabwe victory, but the pair were out within two overs of each other, Taylor reaching 92. Kenya batted first again in the fourth ODI, and surpassed their total from the previous match, setting Zimbabwe 271 to win. In contrast to the previous match, Zimbabwe "chased down [the] challenging target with ease." Forster Mutizwa top-scored during the reply, making 79, while Vermeulen and Taylor also scored half-centuries. Zimbabwe reached the total with six wickets remaining, securing the series with a match to go. The final match, a dead rubber, gave Zimbabwe their largest win of the series. Batting first, they scored 329, during which Masakadza passed his career-best score from the first ODI to record what was at the time the 11th highest score in ODIs, 178 not out. In reply, Kenya failed to recover after losing early wickets, and were all out for 187.

==== Touring ====
The series against Kenya was the only series that Zimbabwe hosted in the 2009–10, the remaining international contests were all tours by Zimbabwe. They played a five match ODI series against Bangladesh, losing the series 4–1, lost both of their two ODIs against South Africa, and then succumbed 4–1 to the West Indies.

== Domestic cricket ==
=== Logan Cup ===
- Winners Mashonaland Eagles

=== Faithwear Metbank One-Day Competition ===
- Winners Mountaineers

=== Stanbic Bank 20 Series ===
- Winners Mountaineers
