= Ryan Bezuidenhout =

Zimbabwean cricketer (born 1986)

Personal information
- Full name: Ryan David Bezuidenhout
- Born: 26 February 1986 (age 40); Harare, Zimbabwe
- Batting: Right-handed
- Bowling: Right arm off break

Domestic team information
- Years: Team
- 2013–2014: Southern Rocks
- 2014–2015: Mid West Rhinos
- FC debut: 9 December 2013 Southern Rocks v Matabeleland Tuskers
- Last FC: 9 December 2014 Mid West Rhinos v Mountaineers
- Only LA: 1 March 2015 Mid West Rhinos v Mashonaland Eagles

Career statistics
Competition	FC	LA
Matches	3	1
Runs scored	65	34
Batting average	13.00	34.00
100s/50s	0/0	0/0
Top score	22	34
Catches/stumpings	2/0	0/0
- Source: CricketArchive, 17 January 2017

Ryan Bezuidenhout (born 26 February 1986) is a Zimbabwean first-class cricketer. He played for the Southern Rocks in the 2013–14 season, and the Mid West Rhinos in 2014–15.
