= Tapfumaneyi Mandizha =

Zimbabwean cricketer (born 1985)

Personal information
- Born: 27 June 1985 (age 41); Harare, Zimbabwe
- Source: ESPNcricinfo, 24 February 2017

Tapfumaneyi Mandizha (born 27 June 1985) is a Zimbabwean cricketer. He made his first-class debut for Midlands cricket team in the 2003–04 Logan Cup on 19 March 2004.
