= Country Club, Harare =

Cricket ground in Harare, Zimbabwe

Coordinates: 17.728555°S 31.146338°E

Country Club, formerly known as the Interfin High Performance Academy, is a cricket ground based in Harare.

It has been the home ground to some powerful teams in the Zimbabwean domestic circuit, such as the Takashinga Cricket Club, the CFX Academy cricket team. It is also home to the Zimbabwe Cricket Academy, part of the infrastructure burned by Mark Vermeulen in 2006. So far, a total of 22 first class matches, 34 List A matches, and seven Twenty20 matches, have been played in this stadium.

== Controversy ==
- Famously, during the 2008-09 Faithwear Inter-Provincial One-Day Series when the stadium hosted some matches along with the Harare Sports Club, on the eve of Game 4, the highly anticipated clash between Easterns and Northerns the match was abandoned on citing poor state of the playing grounds. This led ZC to make an inquiry, but the results were never made available.
