= Trevor Garwe =

Zimbabwean cricketer (born 1986)

Personal information
- Full name: Trevor Nyasha Garwe
- Born: 27 June 1986 (age 40); Harare, Zimbabwe
- Batting: Left-handed
- Bowling: Right-arm fast-medium
- Role: Bowler

International information
- National side: Zimbabwe
- Only ODI (cap 106): 18 October 2009 v Kenya

Domestic team information
- Years: Team
- 2004/05: Mashonaland
- 2005/06: Manicaland
- 2006/07–2008/09: Northerns
- 2009/10–2019/20: Mashonaland Eagles
- 2012/13–2013/14: Southern Rocks

Career statistics
Competition	ODI	FC	LA	T20
Matches	1	102	85	38
Runs scored	0	2,610	526	212
Batting average	–	20.23	11.68	13.25
100s/50s	–	1/7	0/0	0/0
Top score	–	117	42*	39*
Balls bowled	36	12,890	2,976	502
Wickets	1	238	88	41
Bowling average	50.00	27.80	28.42	16.73
5 wickets in innings	0	5	0	1
10 wickets in match	0	0	0	0
Best bowling	1/50	6/65	4/24	5/20
Catches/stumpings	1/–	53/–	23/–	11/–
- Source: CricketArchive, 15 June 2024

Trevor Nyasha Garwe (born 27 June 1986) is a Zimbabwean former international cricketer. He played domestic cricket for the Mashonaland Eagles. Garwe made his One Day International debut for Zimbabwe in October 2009 against Kenya.
