= Tonny Mupariwa =

Zimbabwean cricketer (born 1991)

Personal information
- Born: 10 September 1991 (age 35); Bulawayo, Zimbabwe
- Source: ESPNcricinfo, 3 October 2016

Tonny Mupariwa (born 10 September 1991) is a Zimbabwean first-class cricketer who plays for Matabeleland Tuskers.
