= Godwill Mamhiyo =

Zimbabwean cricketer (born 1992)

Personal information
- Born: 13 May 1992 (age 34); Bulawayo, Zimbabwe
- Source: ESPNcricinfo, 3 October 2016

Godwill Mamhiyo (born 13 May 1992) is a Zimbabwean first-class cricketer who plays for Matabeleland Tuskers.
