= Tafadzwa Mpofu =

Zimbabwean cricketer (born 1985)

Personal information
- Born: 9 May 1985 (age 41); Kwekwe, Zimbabwe
- Source: ESPNcricinfo, 23 February 2017

Tafadzwa Mpofu (born 9 May 1985) is a Zimbabwean cricketer. He made his first-class debut for the Midlands cricket team in the 2003–04 Logan Cup on 9 April 2004.
