= Tafadzwa Kamungozi =

Zimbabwean cricketer (born 1987)

Personal information
- Born: 8 June 1987 (age 39); Harare, Zimbabwe
- Batting: Right-handed
- Bowling: Leg break
- Role: Bowler

International information
- National side: Zimbabwe
- Only Test (cap 93): 25 October 2014 v Bangladesh
- ODI debut (cap 96): 20 September 2006 v South Africa
- Last ODI: 24 February 2015 v West Indies

Career statistics
Competition	Test	ODI	FC	LA
Matches	1	14	45	78
Runs scored	5	27	750	300
Batting average	2.50	5.40	11.02	7.69
100s/50s	0/0	0/0	0/1	0/0
Top score	5	12*	71*	26
Balls bowled	156	636	8,025	3,752
Wickets	1	12	108	79
Bowling average	58.00	45.66	37.39	33.77
5 wickets in innings	0	0	4	1
10 wickets in match	0	0	0	0
Best bowling	1/51	2/36	8/125	6/13
Catches/stumpings	0/–	6/–	20/–	22/–
- Source: ESPNcricinfo, 22 May 2015

Tafadzwa Kamungozi (born 8 June 1987) is a Zimbabwean cricketer who bowls leg break. He was picked in the Zimbabwean squad for the 2006 Champions Trophy without having played any One-day Internationals before, though he did play for a Zimbabwe Board XI in a three-match series against an Australian Academy team which was lost 0–3. Kamungozi played three official List A matches for Masvingo in the 2005–06 one-day league in Zimbabwe, taking five wickets, of which four came in a game against Mashonaland who were bowled out for 76.

He made his Test match debut for Zimbabwe against Bangladesh on 25 October 2014.

== Tour of South Africa ==
Kamungozi made his debut for the senior Zimbabwe side in a Twenty20 tour match on the 2006–07 tour of South Africa against Eagles, where he scored one run from two balls at No. 11 and bowled four overs for 27, thus being the most economical of Zimbabwe's bowlers in the nine-wicket loss. He also played in the third and final One-day International of the series, conceding 70 runs off his 10 overs as South Africa racked up 418 for five and Zimbabwe lost by 171 runs.
