= Zimbabwe A cricket team =

Second-tier national cricket team of Zimbabwe

Zimbabwe 'A'

Personnel
- Test captain: Roy Kaia
- One Day captain: Wellington Masakadza
- Coach: Walter Chawaguta

Team information
- Founded: 1994
- Home ground: Harare Sports Club
- Capacity: n/a

History
- First-class debut: South Africa A in October 4, 1994 at Alexandra Sports Club, Harare
- Official website: Official Website

The Zimbabwe A cricket team is a national cricket team representing Zimbabwe. It is the second-tier of international Zimbabwean cricket, below the full Zimbabwe national cricket team. Matches played by Zimbabwe A are not considered to be Test matches or One Day Internationals, instead receiving first-class and List A classification, respectively. Zimbabwe A played their first match in January 1994, a four-day first-class contest against the touring South Africa A cricket team.

== International seasons summary ==
Zimbabwe A have played a number of series, both home and away, against other full national teams, national A teams, and other first-class opposition. Their first tour was that of South Africa in 1995–96. Zimbabwe A team participates in ICC Africa Division 1 that is played as a gateway to ICC World Twenty20 Qualifier. Although the Zimbabwe national cricket team is qualified for ICC World Twenty20s as a full member, the team A plays in the Africa division as a supporting team.

Zimbabwe was scheduled to play Bangladesh A in a tour of Bangladesh in June 2014. However, the Bangladesh Cricket Board decided to move the dates because of the monsoon season and invited Zimbabwe to tour in July–August. Zimbabwe Cricket had to refuse the offer because it was hosting South Africa and then a Tri-series against Australia and South Africa at that time.

In July 2014, the team was scheduled to play two List A matches against Afghanistan before four ODIs and two first-class matches.

The Zimbabwe A cricket team were to play four unofficial One Day International matches (with List A status) and two unofficial Test matches (with first-class status) in May and June 2021 against the South Africa A cricket team.
