= Norbert Manyande =

Zimbabwean-Namibian cricketer

Personal information
- Full name: Rangarirai Norbert Manyande
- Born: 29 August 1979 (age 47); Bikita, Victoria Province, Zimbabwe-Rhodesia
- Batting: Right-handed
- Bowling: Right-arm medium
- Role: All-rounder

International information
- National side: Namibia (2009–2011)

Domestic team information
- Years: Team
- 2000/01: Mashonaland
- 2001/02: Mashonaland A
- 2003/04–2005/06: Manicaland

Career statistics
Competition	FC	LA	T20
Matches	28	21	8
Runs scored	991	183	81
Batting average	21.54	13.07	13.50
100s/50s	1/2	0/0	0/1
Top score	148	34*	51
Balls bowled	1,377	164	12
Wickets	13	7	0
Bowling average	56.92	19.42	–
5 wickets in innings	1	0	–
10 wickets in match	0	0	–
Best bowling	5/29	3/34	–
Catches/stumpings	13/–	6/–	2/–
- Source: CricketArchive, 6 April 2015

Rangarirai Norbert Manyande (born 29 August 1979) is a former Zimbabwean cricketer who played for several domestic teams during the early 2000s. He moved to Namibia later in the decade, and went on to represent the Namibian national side at tournaments in South Africa and Zimbabwe. Having begun his coaching career while still playing in Zimbabwe, Manyande was appointed coach of the Namibian under-19 side in 2013, and has overseen its successful qualification for the 2014 and 2016 Under-19 World Cups.

== Career in Zimbabwe ==
Manyande was born in Bikita in 1979, in what was then Zimbabwe-Rhodesia's Victoria Province (now called Masvingo Province). A Takashinga Cricket Club and Churchill School player, he made his senior debut in Zimbabwean domestic cricket during the 2000–01 season of the Logan Cup, with a single match for Mashonaland. Manyande switched to Mashonaland A for the following 2001–02 season, playing an additional four matches, and even captained the side for one game against Midlands, in only his third first-class appearance. A right-handed all-rounder, he finished with seven wickets for the season, behind only two national team players, David Mutendera and Prosper Utseya, for Mashonaland A.

The Logan Cup was reduced from six to four teams for the 2002–03 edition, and Manyande consequently played no matches that season. However, for the 2003–04 season, he secured a place with Manicaland, featuring in four Logan Cup games and three Inter-Provincial One-Day games. In the final Logan Cup game of the season, against Matabeleland in April 2004, Manyande was (for the first time) promoted to open the batting for Manicaland, also replacing Neil Ferreira as the team's wicket-keeper. In the first innings, he scored 148 runs from 233 balls, featuring in a 288-run stand for the third wicket with Andre Soma, who scored 204 from 213 balls. Both Manyande and Soma's innings were their maiden first-class half-centuries, and would turn out to be their only first-class centuries. Manicaland finished with a first-innings total of 526, but were bowled out for 207 in their second innings to lose by 16 runs, with Manyande scoring a duck.

Australia toured Zimbabwe in May 2004, and Manyande played one match for Zimbabwe A against the Australian tourists as a warm-up, taking the wicket of Matthew Hayden from his three overs. However, he played no domestic matches during the 2004–05 season, instead serving as an assistant coach with the Zimbabwe Cricket Academy in Harare. Owing to the ongoing Zimbabwean cricket crisis, no Logan Cup was played the following season. Manyande was however appointed Manicaland's captain for the shortened domestic one-day tournament that took place, with only four matches per side. He performed well in the side's two wins, against Mashonaland and Midlands, taking 3/34 (his best List A bowling figures) in the latter match.

== Career in Namibia ==
One of many Zimbabwean cricketers to leave the country around the time, Manyande left for Namibia in 2007, playing club cricket and coaching with Cricket Namibia's high performance program and in local schools. Asked to play for the national side (despite being ineligible for any ICC tournaments), Manyande made his debut for Namibia during the 2009–10 South African season, during which the team was participating in the CSA Provincial Competitions. He became one of the few black players to represent Namibia at senior level. Manyande was a regular for Namibia in both formats of the provincial competition, playing 10 out of a possible 12 one-day games and 12 out of a possible 13 three-day games. In his second three-day game, played against Griqualand West at Kimberley's De Beers Diamond Oval, he took 5/29 in the first innings, his first and only first-class five-wicket haul. Although those went on to be his only wickets for the tournament, Manyande also scored two half-centuries (53 against Easterns and 91 against Gauteng). His 483 runs in the three-day competition was the fourth-best for Namibia, behind Craig Williams, Gerhard Rudolph, and Raymond van Schoor.

Later in the 2009–10 season, Manyande made his debut in the Twenty20 format, playing for Namibia in the Zimbabwean Stanbic Bank 20 Series. His best performance at that tournament came against the Mashonaland Eagles, an innings of 51 from 40 balls. Manyande played less frequently for the national side over the following two seasons, but did play his first and only international fixture, a limited-overs game against Uganda in September 2010. Uganda were in Namibia to play an ICC Intercontinental Shield game, but also played two one-day games and a Twenty20, which were not part of any ICC tournament (hence Manyande was eligible to play). Manyande's final competitive match for Namibia came against KwaZulu-Natal in December 2011.

Having been team manager at the 2010 Under-19 World Cup (with South African Johan Rudolph as coach), Manyande was appointed assistant coach of the Namibian under-19 team for the 2012 World Cup, and took over as head coach for the 2013 Africa Under-19 Championship. Namibia placed first at that tournament to qualify for the 2014 World Cup in the United Arab Emirates, and repeated the feat at the 2015 Africa Under-19 Championship to qualify directly for the 2016 World Cup. Outside of his roles with the under-19 team, Manyande works as Cricket Namibia's high performance manager, and was also assistant coach (to Doug Watson) of the senior national team at the 2015 WCL Division Two tournament. In Namibian club cricket, he coaches the NDF Oshiponga Cricket Club, which was established only in 2012.
