= Logan Cup =

Domestic first-class cricket competition in Zimbabwe

- Countries: Zimbabwe
- Administrator: Zimbabwe Cricket
- Format: first-class
- First edition: 1993-94
- Latest edition: 2025-26
- Number of teams: 5
- Current champion: Southern Rocks (2nd title)
- Most successful: Mashonaland (9 titles)
- 2026–27 Logan Cup

The Logan Cup is the premier domestic first-class cricket competition in Zimbabwe and is organised by Zimbabwe Cricket. It is named after James Douglas Logan.

== History ==
The first recorded cricket match in what was known at the time as Rhodesia was played in August 1890 near Fort Victoria. Within the next ten years, matches were played with more regularity and the most significant match was between teams representing Salisbury and Bulawayo.

In 1903, James Douglas Logan presented Rhodesia's cricket teams with a cup to compete for, which was named the Logan Cup after him. For most of its history the Logan Cup was an annual inter-provincial weekend contest of two-day matches between the four provinces of Matabaleland, Mashonaland, Manicaland and Midlands, however on occasion the matches were sometimes three-day matches (as in the 1920/21, 1921/22, and 1923/24 seasons) or more rarely one-day single innings matches (as in the 1938/39 season and in the 1971/72 season when the Logan Cup was played along the lines of the Gillette Cup for the first time). At first-class level, Rhodesia entered a team in the South African Currie Cup in 1904–05, and then for most South African seasons from 1929–30 until 1978–79.

=== First-class ===
The Logan Cup became first-class along with Zimbabwe's elevation to Test status in 1992, and the first competition to hold first-class status was the 1993–94 Logan Cup, won by Mashonaland Under-24s. Mashonaland, essentially a representative Harare side has historically been the strongest team in the country since the late 1960s, and between 1993 and 2005 they won the tournament nine times out of twelve. The competition was not played in the 2005–06 season, due to "internal strife", both within Zimbabwean cricket, and the political set-up of the country. Upon the competition's return in 2006–07 it was relaunched with teams representing new areas, rather than the traditional provinces. Kenya were also invited to compete in the competition during 2006–07, but finished last despite showing promise.

=== Franchise era ===
The competition was again relaunched for the 2009–10 season, with five franchises: Mashonaland Eagles, Matabeleland Tuskers, Mid West Rhinos, Mountaineers and Southern Rocks. After the 2013–14 season Southern Rocks, consistently the weakest of the five teams, had their franchise suspended, leaving four teams to compete from 2014–15 to 2016–17. In 2017–18 a new academy-based team of young players, Rising Stars, brought the number of competing teams back to five. On 4 May 2020, Zimbabwe Cricket voided the 2019–20 season due to the COVID-19 pandemic with no winner being declared. The 2020–21 season saw the return of Rocks, who last played in the 2013–14 tournament. In March 2021, Rocks won their first ever Logan Cup title.

== Champions ==
This table lists all the champions of the Logan Cup during the competition's first-class era.

Season	Winner (number of titles)	Runners-up	Leading run-scorer (club)	Runs	Leading wicket-taker (club)	Wickets
1993–94	Mashonaland Under-24s (1)	Matabeleland	Wayne James (Matabeleland)	386	John Rennie (Matabeleland)	20
1994–95	Mashonaland (1)	Mashonaland Under-24s	Grant Flower (Mashonaland Under-24s)	368	Malcolm Jarvis (Mashonaland)	19
1995–96	Matabeleland (1)	Mashonaland Country Districts	David Houghton (Mashonaland)	348	Bryan Strang (Mashonaland Country Districts)	25
1996–97	Mashonaland (2)	Matabeleland	Grant Flower (Mashonaland)	308	Paul Strang (Mashonaland)	14
1997–98	Mashonaland (3)	Matabeleland, Mashonaland A	Andy Flower (Mashonaland)	317	John Rennie (Matabeleland)	12
1998–99	Matabeleland (2)	Mashonaland, Mashonaland A	Guy Whittall (Matabeleland)	268	Andrew Whittall (Matabeleland)	7
1999–2000	Mashonaland (4)	Manicaland	Neil Ferreira (Manicaland)	501	Gus Mackay (Mashonaland)	18
2000–01	Mashonaland (5)	Mashonaland A	Dougie Marillier (Midlands)	501	Ian Engelbrecht (Matabeleland)	25
2001–02	Mashonaland (6)	Midlands	Craig Evans (Mashonaland)	684	Ray Price (Midlands)	31
2002–03	Mashonaland (7)	Matabeleland	Mark Vermeulen (Matabeleland)	625	Gavin Ewing (Matabeleland)	28
2003–04	Mashonaland (8)	Matabeleland	Gregory Strydom (Matabeleland)	681	Tatenda Taibu (Mashonaland)	20
2004–05	Mashonaland (9)	Manicaland	Brendan Taylor (Mashonaland)	642	Graeme Cremer (Mashonaland)	27
2005–06	Not held					
2006–07	Easterns (1)	Westerns	Tinotenda Mawoyo (Easterns)	568	Keith Dabengwa (Westerns)	33
2007–08	Northerns (1)	Easterns	Hamilton Masakadza (Easterns)	371	Brighton Mugochi (Centrals)	24
2008–09	Easterns (2)	Northerns	Malcolm Waller (Centrals)	503	Prosper Utseya (Easterns)	30
2009–10	Mashonaland Eagles (1)	Mid West Rhinos	Vusi Sibanda (Mid West Rhinos)	1,287	Graeme Cremer (Mid West Rhinos)	59
2010–11	Matabeleland Tuskers (1)	Mountaineers	Hamilton Masakadza (Mountaineers)	852	Tendai Chatara (Mountaineers)	55
2011–12	Matabeleland Tuskers (2)	Mashonaland Eagles	Gary Ballance (Mid West Rhinos)	1,093	Glen Querl (Matebeleland Tuskers)	45
2012–13	Matabeleland Tuskers (3)	Mountaineers	Richmond Mutumbami (Southern Rocks)	686	Ed Rainsford (Mid West Rhinos)	38
2013–14	Mountaineers (1)	Mashonaland Eagles	Regis Chakabva (Mashonaland Eagles)	588	Donald Tiripano (Mountaineers); John Nyumbu (Matabeleland Tuskers)	34
2014–15	Matabeleland Tuskers (4)	Mid West Rhinos	Tinotenda Mutombodzi (Mashonaland Eagles)	630	Bradley Wadlan (Mid West Rhinos)	39
2015–16	Mashonaland Eagles (2)	Matabeleland Tuskers	Craig Ervine (Matabeleland Tuskers)	477	Shingi Masakadza (Mountaineers)	25
2016–17	Mountaineers (2)	Mid West Rhinos	Kevin Kasuza (Mountaineers)	446	Natsai Mushangwe (Mountaineers)	24
2017–18	Mountaineers (3)	Mashonaland Eagles	Cephas Zhuwao (Mashonaland Eagles)	821	Ernest Masuku (Matabeleland Tuskers)	32
2018–19	Mountaineers (4)	Mid West Rhinos	Timycen Maruma (Mountaineers)	409	Donald Tiripano (Mountaineers)	25
2019–20	The tournament was voided due to the COVID-19 pandemic with no winner being declared.		Neville Madziva (Mid West Rhinos)	361	Tapiwa Mufudza (Mashonaland Eagles)	30
2020–21	Rocks (1)	Mashonaland Eagles	Roy Kaia (Southern Rocks)	374	Tendai Chisoro (Southern Rocks)	18
2021–22	Matabeleland Tuskers (5)	Mountaineers	Craig Ervine (Matabeleland Tuskers)	629	Ernest Masuku (Matabeleland Tuskers)	38
2022–23	Mashonaland Eagles (3)	Mid West Rhinos	Ben Compton (Mountaineers)	714	Tapiwa Mufudza (Mashonaland Eagles); Brandon Mavuta (Mid West Rhinos)	29
2023–24	Mountaineers (5)	Southern Rocks	Brian Chari (Matabeleland Tuskers)	692	Alex Russell (Mashonaland Eagles)	37
2024–25	Mountaineers (6)	Rhinos	Nick Welch (Mountaineers)	823	Vincent Masekesa (Mountaineers)	43
2025–26	Southern Rocks (2)	Mashonaland Eagles	Tafadzwa Tsiga (Rocks)	563	Jalat Khan (Rocks)	28

== See also ==
- Cricket in Zimbabwe
