= Lance Malloch-Brown =

Zimbabwean cricketer (born 1979)

Personal information
- Full name: Lance Stephen Malloch-Brown
- Born: 29 June 1979 (age 47); Salisbury, Zimbabwe Rhodesia
- Batting: Right-handed
- Role: Opening batsman

Domestic team information
- Years: Team
- 2000: Midlands
- 2002: Mashonaland
- 2002: Manicaland
- Source: CricketArchive, 6 August 2016

Lance Stephen Malloch-Brown (born 29 June 1979) is a former Zimbabwean cricketer who represented several teams in Zimbabwean domestic cricket. He played as a right-handed opening batsman.

Malloch-Brown was born in Salisbury (now Harare), and attended St. George's College, captaining the school cricket team. He toured England with the Zimbabwe under-19s in 1997, playing three matches against the England under-19s, and also represented the team at the 1998 Under-19 World Cup in South Africa. He played in all six of his team's matches at the World Cup, scoring 116 runs with a best of 62 against the West Indies. Malloch-Brown made his first-class debut in the 1999–00 Logan Cup, playing two matches for Midlands. He later added five matches for Mashonaland during the 2001–02 season and one match for Manicaland during the 2002–03 season. His highest score at first-class level was 78, made for Mashonaland against Mashonaland A in April 2002.
