= Erick Chauluka =

Zimbabwean cricketer

Personal information
- Full name: Erick Chauluka
- Born: 3 September 1983 (age 43); Harare, Zimbabwe
- Batting: Right-handed
- Bowling: Right-arm medium
- Role: Batsman

Domestic team information
- Years: Team
- 2002/03: Manicaland
- 2003/04: Mashonaland
- 2004/05: Midlands
- 2006/07–2008/09: Centrals
- 2009/10–2011/12: Southern Rocks

Career statistics
Competition	FC	LA	T20
Matches	42	28	6
Runs scored	1,641	501	45
Batting average	21.88	20.04	11.25
100s/50s	2/5	0/3	0/0
Top score	113*	70	28
Balls bowled	186	84	24
Wickets	2	2	1
Bowling average	50.00	36.50	53.00
5 wickets in innings	0	0	0
10 wickets in match	0	0	0
Best bowling	1/5	1/30	1/53
Catches/stumpings	23/–	8/–	1/–
- Source: CricketArchive, 13 May 2022

Erick Chauluka (born 9 September 1983) is a Zimbabwean cricketer.

== Career ==
Chauluka is a member of the Takashinga Cricket Club in Harare, and captained the club in 2007.

=== Domestic career ===
Chauluka made his first-classdebut for Manicaland in the 2002–03 Logan Cup, being dismissed for a duck in both innings. He switched to Mashonaland for the 2003–04 season, scoring 231 runs in four matches at an average of 33.00 playing mainly as an opener, including his maiden first-class century against Midlands. He also made his List A debut in the 2003–04 Faithwear Inter-Provincial Competition, scoring 70 runs on his debut against Manicaland batting at #3, which remains his highest List A score. He switched to Midlands for the 2004–05 season, playing four first-class and two List A matches.

No first-class matches were played in the 2005–06 Zimbabwean domestic cricket season due to the Zimbabwean cricket crisis. Chauluka did, however, represent Zimbabwe A in two matches against Bangladesh A in June 2006, scoring 63 runs.

Chauluka was selected to play for Centrals after the first re-structuring of Zimbabwean cricket. He played five first-class and three List A games as captain of the side in the 2006–07 season, scoring 203 runs in the Logan Cup, the most for Centrals in that season. He also played three further first-class matches and one List A match for Zimbabwe A against Kenya Select and South Africa A in the 2006–07 and 2007–08 seasons. Chauluka also played several matches for the Zimbabwe Provinces in the 2007–08 South African domestic season.
