= 2006 ICC Champions Trophy squads =

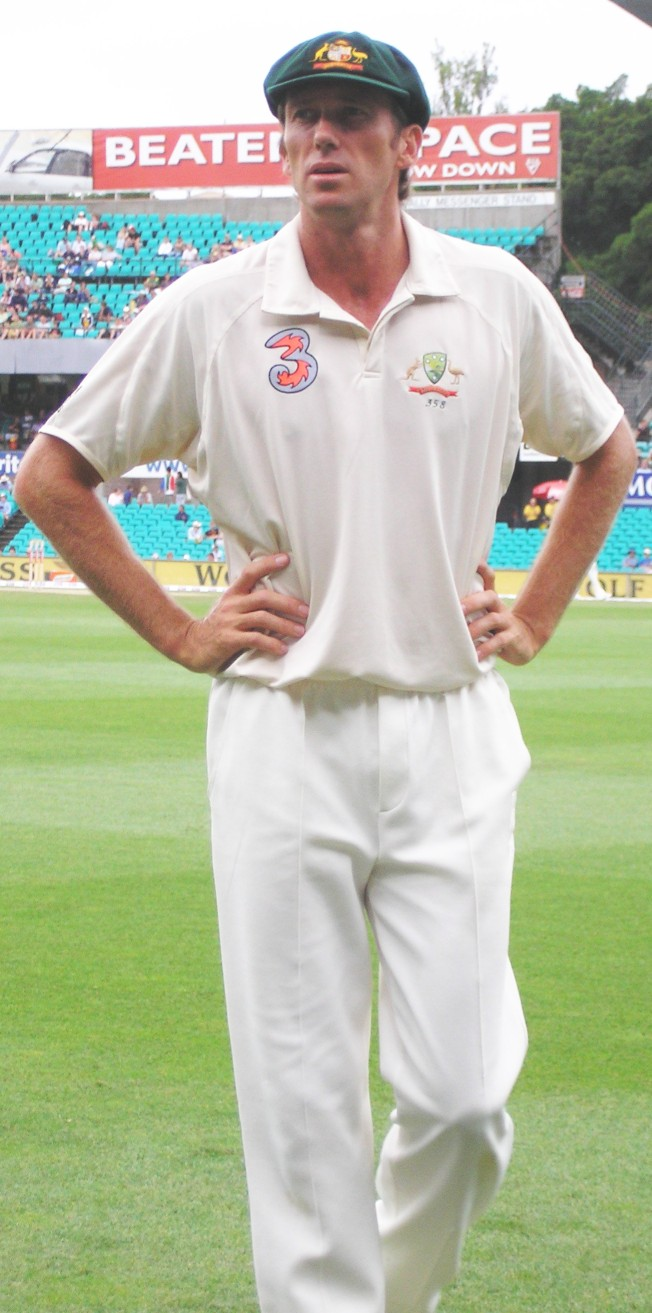
Australian bowler Glenn McGrath, one of the players on Australia's winning team.

These were the 10 squads picked to take part in the 2006 ICC Champions Trophy, the fourth instalment of the Champions Trophy cricket tournament. The tournament was held in India from 7 October to 5 November 2006. Teams could name a preliminary squad of 30, but only 14-man squads were permitted for the actual tournament, and these had to be submitted by 7 September, one month before the start of the tournament.

Several of the squads were changed during or before the tournament due to injuries or suspensions; Pakistan changed their captains three times before the tournament had begun, and also sent home two players due to doping allegations. Both India and Zimbabwe had to replace a player during the tournament, which required the permission of the International Cricket Council's Technical Committee.

== Australia ==
Australia picked a preliminary squad of 30 players, before cutting it down to 14 on 4 September. Stuart Clark suffered a thigh injury and missed the tournament. Dan Cullen was called up as a replacement on 5 October.

Player	Date of birth	ODIs	Batting	Bowling style	First class team
Ricky Ponting (c)	19 December 1974	250	Right	Right arm medium	Tasmanian Tigers
Nathan Bracken	12 September 1977	41	Right	Left arm fast medium	New South Wales Blues
Michael Clarke	2 April 1981	86	Right	Slow left arm orthodox	New South Wales Blues
Dan Cullen	10 April 1984	5	Right	Right arm off-break	Southern Redbacks
Adam Gilchrist	14 November 1971	241	Left	Wicket-keeper	Western Warriors
Brad Hogg	6 February 1971	87	Left	Slow left-arm wrist-spin	Western Warriors
Michael Hussey	27 May 1975	43	Left	Right arm medium	Western Warriors
Mitchell Johnson	2 November 1981	7	Left	Left arm fast medium	Queensland Bulls
Simon Katich	21 August 1975	45	Left	Slow left-arm wrist-spin	New South Wales Blues
Brett Lee	8 November 1976	138	Right	Right arm fast	New South Wales Blues
Glenn McGrath	9 February 1970	224	Right	Right arm medium fast	New South Wales Blues
Damien Martyn	21 October 1971	203	Right	Right arm medium	Western Warriors
Andrew Symonds	9 June 1975	149	Right	Right arm off break	Queensland Bulls
Shane Watson	17 June 1981	47	Right	Right arm fast medium	Queensland Bulls

== Bangladesh ==
Bangladesh selected their squad of 14 on 7 September.

Player	Date of birth	ODIs	Batting	Bowling style	First class team
Habibul Bashar (c)	17 August 1972	84	Right	Right arm off break	Khulna
Abdur Razzak	15 June 1982	22	Right	Slow left arm orthodox	Khulna
Aftab Ahmed	10 November 1985	39	Right	Right arm medium	Chittagong
Farhad Reza	16 June 1986	7	Right	Right arm fast medium	Rajshahi
Khaled Mashud	8 February 1976	120	Right	Wicket-keeper	Rajshahi
Mashrafe Mortaza	5 October 1983	41	Right	Right arm fast medium	Khulna
Mehrab Hossain junior	8 July 1987	0	Left	Slow left arm	Dhaka
Mohammad Ashraful	9 September 1984	76	Right	Right arm leg break	Dhaka
Mohammad Rafique	5 September 1970	100	Left	Slow left arm orthodox	Dhaka
Rajin Saleh	20 November 1983	42	Right	Right arm off break	Sylhet
Shakib Al Hasan	24 March 1987	4	Left	Slow left arm	Khulna
Shahadat Hossain	7 August 1986	10	Right	Right arm fast medium	Dhaka
Shahriar Nafees	25 January 1986	25	Left	n/a	Barisal
Syed Rasel	3 July 1984	16	Left	Left arm medium fast	Khulna

== England ==
England announced a squad of 14 on 12 September, after picking their preliminary squad of 30. Andrew Flintoff, who had not played cricket since July, was named captain.

Player	Date of birth	ODIs	Batting	Bowling style	First class team
Andrew Flintoff (c)	6 December 1977	102	Right	Right arm fast	Lancashire Lightning
James Anderson	30 July 1982	50	Left	Right arm fast medium	Lancashire Lightning
Ian Bell	11 April 1982	23	Right	Right arm medium	Warwickshire Bears
Rikki Clarke	29 September 1981	20	Right	Right arm fast medium	Surrey Lions
Paul Collingwood	26 May 1976	100	Right	Right arm medium fast	Durham Dynamos
Jamie Dalrymple	21 January 1981	11	Right	Right arm off break	Middlesex Crusaders
Steve Harmison	23 October 1978	44	Right	Right arm fast	Durham Dynamos
Ed Joyce	22 September 1978	3	Left	Right arm medium	Middlesex Crusaders
Jon Lewis	26 August 1975	7	Right	Right arm medium fast	Gloucestershire Gladiators
Sajid Mahmood	21 December 1981	12	Right	Right arm fast	Lancashire Lightning
Kevin Pietersen	27 June 1980	36	Right	Right arm off break	Hampshire Hawks
Chris Read	10 August 1978	33	Right	Wicket-keeper	Nottinghamshire Outlaws
Andrew Strauss	2 March 1977	61	Left	Left arm medium	Middlesex Crusaders
Michael Yardy	27 November 1980	2	Left	Right arm off break	Sussex Sharks

== India ==
India selected their squad at the same time as announcing their squad for the 2006–07 DLF Cup. Spinner Anil Kumble, with 264 ODIs under his belt, was not selected, which was made headline news by cricket website ESPNcricinfo.

Player	Date of birth	ODIs	Batting	Bowling style	First class team
Rahul Dravid (c)	11 January 1973	293	Right	Right arm off break	Karnataka
Ajit Agarkar	4 December 1977	169	Right	Right arm fast medium	Mumbai
M. S. Dhoni	7 July 1981	52	Right	Wicket-keeper	Jharkhand
Harbhajan Singh	3 July 1980	134	Right	Right arm off break	Punjab
Mohammad Kaif	1 December 1980	121	Right	Right arm off break	Uttar Pradesh
Dinesh Mongia	17 April 1977	52	Left	Slow left arm orthodox	Punjab, Leicestershire Foxes
Munaf Patel	12 July 1983	10	Right	Right arm medium fast	Maharashtra
Irfan Pathan	27 October 1984	66	Left	Left arm medium fast	Baroda
Ramesh Powar	20 May 1978	15	Right	Right arm off break	Mumbai
Suresh Raina	27 November 1986	30	Left	Right arm off break	Uttar Pradesh
Virender Sehwag	20 October 1978	150	Right	Right arm off break	Delhi
R. P. Singh	6 December 1985	19	Right	Left arm fast medium	Uttar Pradesh
Sachin Tendulkar	24 April 1973	367	Right	Right arm leg break	Mumbai
Yuvraj Singh	12 December 1981	157	Left	Slow left arm orthodox	Punjab
Replacement player
S. Sreesanth	6 February 1983	19	Right	Right arm fast medium	Kerala

== New Zealand ==
New Zealand selected a preliminary squad of 30, before cutting it down to 14 on 7 September. Scott Styris was included despite missing a county match with Middlesex due to injury; Shane Bond, Jacob Oram and Daniel Vettori had all recovered from injuries and were included, while Michael Mason was ruled out by an injury. The selection of Wellington seamer Mark Gillespie, described by coach John Bracewell as "the domestic season's outstanding pace bowler", was described by Herald on Sunday writer Dylan Cleaver as a "bolter".

Player	Date of birth	ODIs	Batting	Bowling style	First class team
Stephen Fleming (c)	1 April 1973	252	Left	Right arm slow medium	Wellington Firebirds, Nottinghamshire Outlaws
Nathan Astle	15 September 1971	212	Right	Right arm medium	Canterbury Wizards, Lancashire Lightning
Shane Bond	7 June 1975	45	Right	Right arm fast	Canterbury Wizards
James Franklin	7 November 1980	41	Left	Left arm fast medium	Wellington Firebirds, Glamorgan Dragons
Peter Fulton	1 February 1979	10	Right	Right arm medium	Canterbury Wizards
Mark Gillespie	17 October 1979	0	Right	Right arm fast medium	Wellington Firebirds
Brendon McCullum	27 September 1981	84	Right	Wicket-keeper	Canterbury Wizards, Glamorgan Dragons
Hamish Marshall	15 February 1979	55	Right	Right arm medium	Northern Districts Knights, Gloucestershire Gladiators
Kyle Mills	15 March 1979	60	Right	Right arm medium	Auckland Aces
Jacob Oram	28 July 1978	83	Left	Right arm medium	Central Districts Stags
Jeetan Patel	7 May 1980	9	Right	Right arm off break	Wellington Firebirds
Scott Styris	10 July 1975	116	Right	Right arm fast medium	Auckland Aces, Middlesex Crusaders
Daniel Vettori	27 January 1979	169	Left	Slow left arm orthodox	Northern Districts Knights, Warwickshire Bears
Lou Vincent	11 November 1978	83	Right	Right arm medium	Auckland Aces, Worcestershire Royals

== Pakistan ==
Pakistan selected their squad on 6 September. Captain Inzamam-ul-Haq have been suspended for four matches due to "bringing the game into disrepute" during the fourth Test of the 2006 series between England and Pakistan, and was thus withdrawn from the squad, and was unable to take any part in the tournament, as Faisal Iqbal was called up as replacement. Younis Khan was named replacement captain, only to resign two days before the tournament began, leading Shahid Afridi to take over. However, on 7 October, the new Pakistan Cricket Board chairman Naseem Ashraf announced that Younis would captain the side.

On 16 October, before Pakistan had started playing any games in the tournament, it was revealed that two Pakistani players, Mohammad Asif and Shoaib Akhtar had failed a drugs test for the banned anabolic steroid nandrolone. Abdur Rehman and Yasir Arafat were called up to replace them.

Player	Date of birth	ODIs	Batting	Bowling style	First class team
Younis Khan (c)	29 November 1977	139	Right	Right arm leg break	HBL, Peshawar
Shahid Afridi (vc)	1 March 1980	225	Right	Right arm leg break googly	HBL, Ireland
Abdul Razzaq	2 December 1979	213	Right	Right arm fast medium	Lahore Ravi
Abdur Rehman	1 March 1980	0	Left	Slow left arm	HBL, Sialkot
Faisal Iqbal	30 December 1981	17	Right	Right arm medium	PIA, Karachi Harbour
Iftikhar Anjum	1 December 1980	19	Right	Right arm medium	ZTBL, Islamabad
Imran Farhat	20 May 1982	27	Left	Right arm leg break	HBL, Lahore Shalimar
Kamran Akmal	13 January 1982	50	Right	Wicket-keeper	NBP, Lahore Ravi
Mohammad Hafeez	17 October 1980	35	Right	Right arm off break	SNGPL, Faisalabad
Mohammad Yousuf	27 August 1974	219	Right		WAPDA, Lahore Ravi
Naved-ul-Hasan	28 February 1978	50	Right	Right arm medium fast	Sialkot, Sussex Sharks
Shoaib Malik	1 February 1982	122	Right	Right arm off break	PIA, Sialkot
Umar Gul	14 April 1984	19	Right	Right arm fast medium	PIA, Peshawar
Yasir Arafat	12 March 1982	6	Right	Right arm medium	NBP, Rawalpindi, Sussex Sharks

== South Africa ==
South Africa selected their squad of 14 on 7 September. The omission of spinner Nicky Boje, with 115 ODI caps for South Africa, was described as "interesting" by ESPNcricinfo.

Player	Date of birth	ODIs	Batting	Bowling style	First class team
Graeme Smith (c)	1 February 1981	90	Left	Off break	Cape Cobras
Loots Bosman	14 April 1977	3	Right	Right arm medium	Eagles
Mark Boucher	3 December 1976	218	Right	Wicket-keeper	Warriors
A. B. de Villiers	17 February 1984	17	Right	Right arm medium and wicket-keeper	Titans
Boeta Dippenaar	14 June 1977	98	Right	Off break	Eagles
Herschelle Gibbs	23 February 1974	186	Right	Right arm medium	Cape Cobras
Andrew Hall	31 July 1975	70	Right	Right arm fast medium	Lions, Kent Spitfires
Jacques Kallis	16 October 1975	229	Right	Right arm fast medium	Cape Cobras
Justin Kemp	2 October 1977	53	Right	Right arm fast medium	Titans, Kent Spitfires
Charl Langeveldt	17 December 1974	31	Right	Right arm fast medium	Lions
André Nel	15 July 1977	47	Right	Right arm fast medium	Titans
Makhaya Ntini	6 July 1977	130	Right	Right arm fast	Warriors
Robin Peterson	4 August 1979	28	Left	Slow left arm orthodox	Warriors
Shaun Pollock	16 July 1973	255	Right	Right arm fast medium	Dolphins

== Sri Lanka ==
Sri Lanka picked a 14-man squad on 25 August 2006.

Player	Date of birth	ODIs	Batting	Bowling style	First class team
Mahela Jayawardene (c)	27 May 1977	219	Right	Right arm medium pace	Sinhalese SC
Marvan Atapattu	22 November 1970	253	Right	Right arm leg break	Sinhalese SC
Malinga Bandara	31 December 1979	19	Right	Right arm leg break googly	Ragama CC
Tillakaratne Dilshan	14 October 1976	96	Right	Right arm off break	Bloomfield C&AC
Dilhara Fernando	19 July 1979	94	Right	Right arm fast medium	Sinhalese SC
Sanath Jayasuriya	30 June 1969	363	Left	Slow left arm orthodox	Bloomfield C&AC
Chamara Kapugedera	24 February 1987	15	Right	Right arm medium	Colombo CC
Farveez Maharoof	7 September 1984	46	Right	Right arm fast medium	Bloomfield C&AC
Lasith Malinga	4 September 1983	15	Right	Right arm medium	Nondescripts CC
Muttiah Muralitharan	17 April 1972	269	Right	Right arm off break	Tamil Union C&AC
Ruchira Perera	6 April 1977	16	Left	Left arm medium fast	Colts CC
Kumar Sangakkara	27 October 1977	167	Left	Wicket-keeper	Nondescripts CC
Upul Tharanga	2 February 1985	29	Left		Nondescripts CC
Chaminda Vaas	27 January 1974	280	Left	Left arm fast medium	Colts CC

== West Indies ==
West Indies went in with the same 14-man squad as in the 2006–07 DLF Cup triangular tournament in Malaysia in September.

Player	Date of birth	ODIs	Batting	Bowling style	First class team
Brian Lara (c)	2 May 1969	271	Left	Right arm leg break googly	Trinidad and Tobago
Ramnaresh Sarwan (vc)	23 June 1980	107	Right	Right arm leg break	Guyana
Carlton Baugh, Jr.	23 June 1982	17	Right	Wicket-keeper	Jamaica
Ian Bradshaw	9 July 1974	47	Left	Left arm fast medium	Barbados
Dwayne Bravo	7 October 1983	48	Right	Right arm medium fast	Trinidad and Tobago, Kent Spitfires
Shivnarine Chanderpaul	18 August 1974	196	Left	Right arm leg break	Guyana
Corey Collymore	21 December 1977	70	Right	Right arm fast medium	Barbados
Fidel Edwards	6 February 1982	21	Right	Right arm fast	Barbados
Chris Gayle	21 September 1979	140	Left	Right arm off break	Jamaica
Wavell Hinds	7 September 1976	110	Left	Right arm medium	Jamaica
Runako Morton	22 July 1978	22	Right	Right arm off break	Leeward Islands
Marlon Samuels	5 February 1981	67	Right	Right arm off break	Jamaica
Dwayne Smith	12 April 1983	47	Right	Right arm medium	Barbados
Jerome Taylor	22 June 1984	16	Right	Right arm fast	Jamaica

== Zimbabwe ==
Tafadzwa Mufambisi replaced Vusimuzi Sibanda as he was playing club cricket in Australia. Gary Brent replaced Terry Duffin before the match with Bangladesh on 13 October.

Player	Date of birth	ODIs	Batting	Bowling style	First class team
Prosper Utseya (c)	26 March 1985	47	Right	Right arm off break	Manicaland
Chamu Chibhabha	6 September 1986	12	Right	Right arm medium	Mashonaland
Elton Chigumbura	14 March 1986	41	Right	Right arm medium	Manicaland
Terry Duffin	20 March 1982	18	Left	Right arm medium	Matabeleland
Anthony Ireland	30 August 1984	16	Right	Right arm medium	Midlands
Tafadzwa Kamungozi	8 June 1987	1	Right	Right arm leg break	Masvingo
Hamilton Masakadza	9 August 1983	29	Right	Right arm leg break googly	Manicaland
Stuart Matsikenyeri	3 May 1983	53	Right	Right arm off break	Manicaland
Tafadzwa Mufambisi	17 December 1986	3	Right	Wicket-keeper	Mashonaland
Tawanda Mupariwa	16 April 1985	18	Right	Right arm fast medium	Matabeleland
Ed Rainsford	14 December 1984	18	Right	Right arm fast medium	Midlands
Piet Rinke	5 November 1981	16	Right	Right arm fast medium	Manicaland
Gregory Strydom	26 March 1984	11	Right	Right arm medium	Matabeleland
Brendan Taylor	6 February 1986	50	Right	Right arm off break and Wicket-keeper	Mashonaland
Replacement player
Gary Brent	13 January 1976	48	Right	Right arm medium fast	Manicaland
