= Andre Soma =

Zimbabwean cricketer (born 1983)

Personal information
- Full name: Andre Davy Soma
- Born: 12 August 1983 (age 43); Mutare, Manicaland, Zimbabwe
- Batting: Right-handed
- Bowling: Right-arm medium

Domestic team information
- Years: Team
- 2000/01–2004/05: Manicaland
- 2006/07: Easterns

Career statistics
Competition	FC	LA
Matches	14	6
Runs scored	549	23
Batting average	22.87	7.66
100s/50s	1/0	0/0
Top score	204	23
Balls bowled	742	6
Wickets	12	0
Bowling average	40.66	–
5 wickets in innings	0	–
10 wickets in match	0	–
Best bowling	3/8	–
Catches/stumpings	8/–	2/–
- Source: ESPNcricinfo, 17 July 2021

Andre Davy Soma (born 12 August 1983) is a former Zimbabwean cricketer. A right-handed batsman and right-arm medium pace bowler, he played 13 first-class matches for Manicaland in the Logan Cup between 2000–01 and 2004–05. He also played one match for Easterns during the 2006–07 Logan Cup.

Soma was born in Mutare, Manicaland. He is the younger brother of cricketer Leon Soma.
