= Alexandra Sports Club =

- Alexandra Sports Club (Zimbabwe)
- Interactive map of Alexandra Sports Club
- Location: Harare, Zimbabwe
- Country: Zimbabwe
- Coordinates: 17°48′58″S 31°02′17″E
- Establishment: unknown (first recorded match in 1949)
- As of 1 August 2016; Source: CricketArchive

The Alexandra Sports Club (also called the Alex Sports Club) is a sporting complex in Harare, the capital of Zimbabwe. The venue's primary use is as a cricket ground, and it has hosted both international and domestic fixtures.

== History ==
Cricket is first recorded as being played at the Alexandra Sports Club in January 1949, at a time when Harare was called Salisbury, and was the capital of the British colony of Southern Rhodesia. It may have been played earlier. The inaugural first-class match on the ground was in October 1990, when a Young Zimbabwe team played a three-day game against Pakistan B (which held first-class status). Beginning with the 1993–94 Logan Cup, the Alexandra Sports Club began to host matches in top-level domestic competitions, generally for teams based in the Mashonaland region (which includes Harare). Mashonaland, Mashonaland A, Mashonaland Country Districts, Mashonaland Under-24s, CFX Academy, and Westerns all played occasional Logan Cup or domestic one-day games at the venue, with the most recent such fixture coming in May 2009.

The Alexandra Sports Club has hosted a number of fixtures for Zimbabwe A, including a first-class game against South Africa A in 1994, a series of games against England A in 1999, and a one-day game against Namibia in 2002. In 1996, the ground was also scheduled to host a game between the Zimbabwe under-19s and the England under-19s, but it was abandoned due to inclement weather. In April 2000, the ground hosted three matches in the ICC Emerging Nations Tournament, two featuring Zimbabwe A (against Denmark and the Netherlands) and one between the Netherlands and Scotland. After that, the next international tournament played there was the Africa regional qualifier for the 2017 Women's World Cup, which was played in April 2016, where Zimbabwe qualified for the World Cup after finishing undefeated in its six matches.

== Records ==
=== First-class ===
- Highest team total: 510/9 dec. by Northerns v. Centrals, 2008/09
- Lowest team total: 49 all out by Zimbabwe Cricket Academy v. Australian Cricket Academy, 1998/99
- Highest individual innings: 243 not out by Grant Flower for Mashonaland v. Matabeleland, 1996/97
- Best bowling in an innings: 8/50 by Darren Thomas for England A v. Zimbabwe A, 1998/99

=== List A ===
- Highest team total: 262/8 by England XI v. Zimbabwe A, 2001/02
- Lowest team total: 95 all out by Matabeleland v. Mashonaland, 2002/03
- Highest individual innings: 118 not out by Piet Rinke for Manicaland v. Matabeleland, 2003/04
- Best bowling in an innings: 5/30 by Mohammad Sharif for Bangladeshis v. CFX Academy, 2000/01

== See also ==
- List of cricket grounds in Zimbabwe
