= Ben Hundermark =

Zimbabwean cricketer (born 1984)

Personal information
- Full name: Benjamin Hundermark
- Born: 7 June 1984 (age 42); Harare, Zimbabwe
- Batting: Right-handed
- Bowling: Right-arm medium-fast

Domestic team information
- Years: Team
- 2004/05: Manicaland
- 2005/06: Midlands

Career statistics
Competition	FC	LA
Matches	2	2
Runs scored	22	5
Batting average	11.00	5.00
100s/50s	0/0	0/0
Top score	22	5
Balls bowled	289	54
Wickets	5	3
Bowling average	40.00	9.66
5 wickets in innings	0	0
10 wickets in match	0	0
Best bowling	3/71	2/21
Catches/stumpings	1/–	0/–
- Source: ESPNcricinfo, 15 July 2021

Benjamin Hundermark (born 7 June 1984) is a former Zimbabwean cricketer. A right-handed batsman and right-arm medium-fast bowler, he played two first-class matches for Manicaland during the 2004–05 Logan Cup.
