= Terry Duffin =

Zimbabwean cricketer (born 1982)

Personal information
- Full name: Terrence Duffin
- Born: 20 March 1982 (age 44); Que Que, Midlands Province, Zimbabwe
- Batting: Left-handed
- Bowling: Right-arm medium
- Role: Opening batsman

International information
- National side: Zimbabwe (2005–2007)
- Test debut (cap 73): 13 September 2005 v India
- Last Test: 20 September 2005 v India
- ODI debut (cap 90): 25 February 2006 v Kenya
- Last ODI: 15 March 2007 v Ireland

Domestic team information
- Years: Team
- 2001/02–2003/04: Midlands
- 2004/05–2005/06: Matabeleland
- 2006/07–2007/08: Southerns
- 2009/10–2012/13: Matabeleland Tuskers

Career statistics
Competition	Test	ODI	FC	LA
Matches	2	23	74	74
Runs scored	80	546	3,772	1,654
Batting average	20.00	23.73	29.70	25.44
100s/50s	0/1	0/3	4/23	0/10
Top score	56	88	193	88
Balls bowled	–	–	36	–
Wickets	–	–	0	–
Bowling average	–	–	–	–
5 wickets in innings	–	–	–	–
10 wickets in match	–	–	–	–
Best bowling	–	–	–	–
Catches/stumpings	1/–	6/–	43/–	32/–
- Source: ESPNcricinfo, 10 October 2017

Terrence Duffin (born 20 March 1982) is a former Zimbabwean international cricketer, who played Test matches and One Day Internationals, captaining the side in ODIs.

== International career ==
Duffin has played two Test matches for Zimbabwe against India as an opening batsman, scoring 56 in the first innings of that tour, making him the fifth Zimbabwean to score a half-century on Test debut. However, in the second innings, Duffin was dismissed for two by Zaheer Khan.

Duffin was selected as the captain of the Zimbabwean One Day International team to play Kenya without having played an ODI. He scored 53 runs in the first ODI and carried his team to victory. He was named man of the match for his match-winning contributions.

== Domestic career ==
Duffin has also played 31 first class matches for Zimbabwe provinces Midlands, Matabeleland and the CFX Academy, as well as Zimbabwe A. In those matches, he has only got one century – 117 in a drawn Logan Cup game with Manicaland in 2004–05, but he has recorded twelve fifties in first-class cricket.

In the summer of 2004 he was the professional for Irvine Cricket Club, who play in Scotland's Western Union Division 1.

Preceded by Tatenda Taibu	Zimbabwean ODI captain 2005–06	Succeeded by Prosper Utseya
