= 1998 KnockOut Trophy squads =

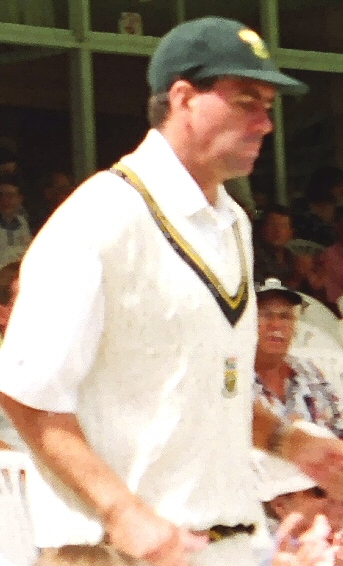
South African player Hansie Cronje, captain of the winning team

These were the nine squads (all Test nations) picked to take part in the 1998 ICC KnockOut Trophy, the first installment of the Champions Trophy cricket tournament. The tournament was held in Bangladesh from 24 October to 2 November 1998 Teams could name a preliminary squad of 30, but only 14-man squads were permitted for the actual tournament, one month before the start of the tournament. In the knockout tournament, New Zealand and Zimbabwe were the only teams to play a pre-quarter final match. New Zealand won the match and qualified for the quarter-final where they faced Sri Lanka. South Africa won the inaugural edition of the ICC KnockOut Trophy by defeating West Indies in the final by four wickets.

Mike Rindel, Herschelle Gibbs and Andrew Hudson were not selected initially in the South African squad. But later, Rindel was recalled in place of injured Gary Kirsten, and Daryll Cullinan was selected as Rindel's opening partner. Arshad Khan, Shoaib Akhtar and Wasim Akram replaced Mushtaq Ahmed, Mohammad Zahid and Abdul Razzaq in the Pakistani squad. Waqar Younis who had not recovered from his elbow injury was left out, whereas Aaqib Javed was recalled into the 14-men squad. Saeed Anwar and Inzamam-ul-Haq were dropped from the initial Pakistani squad due to their withdrawal following injuries, and were replaced by Saleem Elahi and Akhtar Sarfraz. Many New Zealand key players—Dion Nash, Chris Cairns, Llorne Howell and Gavin Larsen—were unavailable for the tournament due to different kind of injuries. Fast bowler, Simon Doull was back into the squad replacing Chris Drum who was also injured.

== Squads ==
=== Australia ===
No.	Player	Date of birth	Batting style	Bowling style	List A team
90	Steve Waugh (captain)	2 June 1965	Right-handed	Right-arm medium	New South Wales
105	Mark Waugh (vice-captain)	2 June 1965	Right-handed	Right-arm medium Right-arm off break	New South Wales
116	Michael Bevan	8 May 1970	Left-handed	Slow left-arm wrist-spin	New South Wales
115	Damien Fleming	24 April 1970	Right-handed	Right-arm fast-medium	Victoria
129	Adam Gilchrist (wicket-keeper)	14 November 1971	Left-handed	Wicket-keeper	Western Australia
112	Brendon Julian	10 August 1970	Right-handed	Left-arm fast-medium	Western Australia
125	Michael Kasprowicz	10 February 1972	Right-handed	Right-arm fast-medium	Queensland
128	Darren Lehmann	5 February 1970	Left-handed	Left-arm orthodox spin	South Australia
109	Damien Martyn	21 October 1971	Right-handed	Right-arm medium	Western Australia
113	Glenn McGrath	9 February 1970	Right-handed	Right-arm fast-medium	New South Wales
123	Ricky Ponting	19 December 1974	Right-handed	Right-arm medium	Tasmania
119	Gavin Robertson	28 May 1966	Right-handed	Right-arm off break	New South Wales
139	Andrew Symonds	9 June 1975	Right-handed	Right-arm medium Right-arm off break	Queensland
138	Brad Young	23 February 1973	Right-handed	Left-arm orthodox spin	South Australia

- Source: CricInfo

=== England ===
No.	Player	Date of birth	Batting style	Bowling style	List A team
143	Adam Hollioake (captain)	5 September 1971	Right-handed	Right-arm medium	Surrey
151	Ian Austin	30 May 1966	Left-handed	Right-arm medium	Lancashire
135	Ali Brown	11 February 1970	Right-handed	Right-arm off break	Surrey
147	Dougie Brown	29 October 1969	Right-handed	Right-arm fast-medium	Warwickshire
136	Mark Ealham	27 August 1969	Right-handed	Right-arm fast-medium	Kent
94	Neil Fairbrother	9 September 1963	Left-handed	Left-arm medium	Lancashire
148	Matthew Fleming	12 December 1964	Right-handed	Right-arm medium	Kent
145	Ashley Giles	19 March 1973	Right-handed	Left-arm orthodox spin	Warwickshire
112	Graeme Hick	23 May 1966	Right-handed	Right-arm off break	Worcestershire
140	Nick Knight	28 November 1969	Left-handed	Right-arm medium	Warwickshire
141	Graham Lloyd	1 July 1969	Right-handed	Right-arm medium	Lancashire
131	Peter Martin	15 November 1968	Right-handed	Right-arm fast-medium	Lancashire
96	Jack Russell (wicket-keeper)	15 August 1963	Left-handed	Wicket-keeper	Gloucestershire
144	Chris Silverwood	5 March 1975	Right-handed	Right-arm fast-medium	Yorkshire

- Source: CricInfo

=== India ===
No.	Player	Date of birth	Batting style	Bowling style	List A team
51	Mohammad Azharuddin (captain)	8 February 1963	Right-handed	Right-arm medium	Hyderabad
111	Ajit Agarkar	4 December 1977	Right-handed	Right-arm fast-medium	Bombay
95	Rahul Dravid	11 January 1973	Right-handed	Right-arm off break	Karnataka
84	Sourav Ganguly	8 July 1972	Left-handed	Right-arm medium	Bengal
85	Ajay Jadeja	1 February 1971	Right-handed	Right-arm medium	Haryana
98	Sunil Joshi	6 June 1970	Left-handed	Left-arm orthodox spin	Karnataka
78	Anil Kumble	17 October 1970	Right-handed	Right-arm leg break Googly	Karnataka
112	V. V. S. Laxman	1 November 1974	Right-handed	Right-arm off break	Hyderabad
88	Nayan Mongia (wicket-keeper)	19 December 1969	Right-handed	Wicket-keeper	Baroda
89	Venkatesh Prasad	5 August 1969	Right-handed	Right-arm medium-fast	Karnataka
71	Robin Singh	14 September 1963	Left-handed	Right-arm medium-fast	Tamil Nadu
81	Javagal Srinath	31 August 1969	Right-handed	Right-arm fast-medium	Karnataka
74	Sachin Tendulkar	24 April 1973	Right-handed	Right-arm spin	Bombay

- Source: CricInfo

=== New Zealand ===
No.	Player	Date of birth	Batting style	Bowling style	List A team
88	Stephen Fleming (captain)	1 April 1973	Left-handed	Right-arm medium	Canterbury
98	Geoff Allott	24 December 1971	Right-handed	Left-arm fast-medium	Canterbury
93	Nathan Astle	15 September 1971	Right-handed	Right-arm medium	Canterbury
106	Mark Bailey	26 November 1970	Right-handed	Right-arm medium	Northern Districts
107	Matthew Bell	25 February 1977	Right-handed	Right-arm off break	Wellington
78	Simon Doull	6 August 1969	Right-handed	Right-arm medium	Northern Districts
72	Chris Harris	20 November 1969	Left-handed	Right-arm medium	Canterbury
99	Matt Horne	5 December 1970	Right-handed	Right-arm medium	Otago
102	Craig McMillan	13 September 1976	Right-handed	Right-arm medium	Canterbury
103	Shayne O'Connor	15 November 1973	Left-handed	Left-arm fast-medium	Otago
80	Adam Parore (wicket-keeper)	23 January 1971	Right-handed	Wicket-keeper	Auckland
108	Alex Tait	13 June 1972	Right-handed	Right-arm medium	Northern Districts
100	Daniel Vettori	27 January 1979	Left-handed	Left-arm orthodox spin	Northern Districts
105	Paul Wiseman	4 May 1970	Right-handed	Right-arm off break	Otago

- Source: CricInfo

=== Pakistan ===
No.	Player	Date of birth	Batting style	Bowling style	List A team
80	Aamer Sohail (captain)	14 September 1966	Left-handed	Left-arm orthodox spin	Lahore
109	Shahid Afridi	1 March 1980	Right-handed	Right-arm leg break	Karachi
60	Ijaz Ahmed	20 September 1968	Right-handed	Left-arm medium	Islamabad
123	Shoaib Akhtar	13 August 1975	Right-handed	Right-arm fast	Rawalpindi
53	Wasim Akram	3 June 1966	Left-handed	Left-arm fast	Lahore
102	Saleem Elahi	21 November 1976	Right-handed	Right-arm off break	Lahore
67	Aaqib Javed	5 August 1972	Right-handed	Right-arm fast-medium	Islamabad
87	Arshad Khan	22 March 1971	Right-handed	Right-arm off break	Peshawar
79	Moin Khan (wicket-keeper)	23 September 1971	Right-handed	Wicket-keeper	Karachi
108	Azhar Mahmood	28 February 1975	Right-handed	Right-arm fast-medium	Islamabad
38	Saleem Malik	16 April 1963	Right-handed	Right-arm medium	Lahore
103	Saqlain Mushtaq	29 December 1976	Right-handed	Right-arm off break	Islamabad
119	Akhtar Sarfraz	20 February 1976	Left-handed	Right-arm off break	Peshawar
122	Yousuf Youhana	27 August 1974	Right-handed	Right-arm off break	Lahore

- Source: CricInfo

=== South Africa ===
No.	Player	Date of birth	Batting style	Bowling style	List A team
15	Hansie Cronje (captain)	25 September 1969	Right-handed	Right-arm medium	Free State
51	Dale Benkenstein	9 June 1974	Right-handed	Right-arm medium Right-arm off break	KwaZulu-Natal
34	Nicky Boje	20 March 1973	Left-handed	Left-arm orthodox spin	Free State
46	Mark Boucher (wicket-keeper)	3 December 1976	Right-handed	Wicket-keeper	Border
31	Derek Crookes	5 March 1969	Right-handed	Right-arm off break	Gauteng
25	Daryll Cullinan	4 March 1967	Right-handed	Right-arm off break	Gauteng
52	Alan Dawson	27 November 1969	Right-handed	Right-arm fast-medium	Western Province
48	Steve Elworthy	23 February 1965	Right-handed	Right-arm fast-medium	Northerns
38	Jacques Kallis	16 October 1975	Right-handed	Right-arm fast-medium	Western Province
28	Gary Kirsten	23 November 1967	Left-handed	Right-arm off break	Western Province
47	Makhaya Ntini	6 July 1977	Right-handed	Right-arm fast	Border
39	Shaun Pollock	16 July 1973	Right-handed	Right-arm fast-medium	KwaZulu-Natal
17	Jonty Rhodes	27 July 1969	Right-handed	Right-arm medium	KwaZulu-Natal
27	Pat Symcox	14 April 1960	Right-handed	Right-arm off break	Griqualand West

- Source: CricInfo

=== Sri Lanka ===
No.	Player	Date of birth	Batting style	Bowling style	List A team
24	Arjuna Ranatunga (captain)	1 December 1963	Left-handed	Right-arm medium	Sinhalese SC
37	Aravinda de Silva (vice-captain)	17 October 1965	Right-handed	Right-arm off break	Nondescripts CC
59	Marvan Atapattu	22 November 1970	Right-handed	Right-arm leg break	Sinhalese SC
78	Upul Chandana	7 May 1972	Right-handed	Right-arm leg break	Nondescripts CC
82	Kumar Dharmasena	24 April 1971	Right-handed	Right-arm off break	Bloomfield
93	Avishka Gunawardene	26 May 1977	Left-handed	–	Sinhalese SC
58	Sanath Jayasuriya	30 June 1969	Left-handed	Left-arm orthodox spin	Bloomfield
61	Romesh Kaluwitharana (wicket-keeper)	24 November 1969	Right-handed	Wicket-keeper	Sebastianites
45	Roshan Mahanama	31 May 1966	Right-handed	–	Colombo CC
70	Muttiah Muralitharan	17 April 1972	Right-handed	Right-arm off break	Tamil Union
51	Hashan Tillakaratne	14 July 1967	Left-handed	Right-arm off break	Nondescripts CC
75	Chaminda Vaas	27 January 1974	Left-handed	Left-arm fast-medium	Colts CC
64	Pramodya Wickramasinghe	14 August 1971	Right-handed	Right-arm fast-medium	Sinhalese SC
89	Nuwan Zoysa	13 May 1978	Left-handed	Left-arm fast-medium	Sinhalese SC

- Source: CricInfo

=== West Indies ===
No.	Player	Date of birth	Batting style	Bowling style	List A team
59	Brian Lara (captain)	2 May 1969	Left-handed	Right-arm leg break Googly	Trinidad and Tobago
55	Keith Arthurton	21 February 1965	Left-handed	Left-arm orthodox spin	Leeward Islands
66	Shivnarine Chanderpaul	16 August 1974	Left-handed	Right-arm leg break	Guyana
86	Mervyn Dillon	5 June 1974	Right-handed	Right-arm fast-medium	Trinidad and Tobago
50	Carl Hooper	15 December 1966	Right-handed	Right-arm off break	Guyana
76	Ridley Jacobs (wicket-keeper)	26 November 1967	Left-handed	Wicket-keeper	Leeward Islands
89	Reon King	6 October 1975	Right-handed	Right-arm fast-medium	Guyana
58	Clayton Lambert	10 February 1962	Left-handed	Right-arm off break	Guyana
85	Rawl Lewis	5 September 1974	Right-handed	Right-arm leg break Googly	Windward Islands
78	Nixon McLean	20 July 1973	Left-handed	Right-arm fast	Windward Islands
87	Neil McGarrell	12 July 1972	Right-handed	Left-arm orthodox spin	Guyana
51	Phil Simmons	18 April 1963	Right-handed	Right-arm medium	Trinidad and Tobago
61	Philo Wallace	2 August 1970	Right-handed	Right-arm medium	Barbados
68	Stuart Williams	12 August 1969	Right-handed	Right-arm medium	Leeward Islands

- Source: CricInfo

=== Zimbabwe ===
No.	Player	Date of birth	Batting style	Bowling style	List A team
22	Alistair Campbell (captain)	23 September 1972	Left-handed	Right-arm off break	Mashonaland
26	Craig Evans	29 November 1969	Right-handed	Right-arm medium	Mashonaland
20	Andy Flower (wicket-keeper)	28 April 1968	Left-handed	Wicket-keeper	Mashonaland
27	Grant Flower	20 December 1970	Right-handed	Left-arm orthodox spin	Mashonaland
52	Murray Goodwin	11 December 1972	Right-handed	Right-arm leg break	Mashonaland
55	Neil Johnson	24 January 1970	Left-handed	Right-arm fast-medium	Matabeleland
48	Pommie Mbangwa	26 June 1976	Right-handed	Right-arm fast-medium	Mashonaland; Matabeleland
47	Gavin Rennie	12 January 1976	Left-handed	Left-arm orthodox spin	Mashonaland
38	Paul Strang	28 July 1970	Right-handed	Right-arm leg break Googly	Mashonaland
34	Heath Streak	16 March 1974	Right-handed	Right-arm fast-medium	Matabeleland
45	Andy Whittall	28 March 1973	Right-handed	Right-arm off break	Matabeleland
44	Craig Wishart	9 January 1974	Right-handed	Right-arm off break	Mashonaland; Matabeleland
41	Henry Olonga	3 July 1976	Right-handed	Right-arm fast	Matabeleland
51	Adam Huckle	21 September 1971	Right-handed	Right-arm leg break Googly	Matabeleland

- Source: CricInfo
