= 1999–2000 Logan Cup =

- Administrator(s): Zimbabwe Cricket
- Cricket format: First-class cricket (4 days)
- Tournament format(s): League system and Final
- Champions: Mashonaland (4th title)
- Participants: 5
- Matches: 11
- Most runs: 501 – Neil Ferreira (Manicaland)
- Most wickets: 18 – Gus Mackay (Mashonaland)

The 1999–2000 Logan Cup was a first-class cricket competition held in Zimbabwe from 3 March 2000 – 7 April 2000. It was won by Mashonaland, who beat Manicaland in the final having finished second behind them in the league stage of the competition.

== Points table ==
Team	Pld	W	L	D	Bat	Bwl	Pts
Manicaland	4	2	0	2	5	16	51
Mashonaland	4	2	0	2	6	14	50
CFX Academy	4	1	0	3	6	15	42
Midlands	4	1	3	0	1	12	25
Matabeleland	4	0	3	1	4	16	23
Source:CricketArchive

== Final ==
7–9 April 2000
Scorecard

Mashonaland	v	Manicaland
345 (91 overs); Trevor Gripper 86 (124); Leon Soma 4/63 (17 overs)		123 (61.4 overs); Hamilton Masakadza 53 (170); Bryan Strang 7/20 (21 overs)
275/5d (49 overs); Gavin Rennie 87 (94); Hamilton Masakadza 1/9 (3.4 overs)		240 (76.5 overs); Stuart Matsikenyeri 73* (126); Gavin Rennie 7/66 (23.5 overs)

Mashonaland won by 257 runs
Harare Sports Club, Harare
Umpires: Ian Robinson and Russell Tiffin

- Manicanaland won the toss and elected to field.
