= Prosper Utseya =

Zimbabwean cricketer

Personal information
- Full name: Prosper Utseya
- Born: 26 March 1985 (age 41); Harare, Zimbabwe
- Batting: Right-handed
- Bowling: Right arm off break
- Role: Bowler

International information
- National side: Zimbabwe (2004–2015)
- Test debut (cap 65): 6 May 2004 v Sri Lanka
- Last Test: 10 September 2013 v Pakistan
- ODI debut (cap 81): 20 April 2004 v Sri Lanka
- Last ODI: 4 August 2015 v New Zealand
- ODI shirt no.: 52
- T20I debut (cap 10): 28 November 2006 v Bangladesh
- Last T20I: 29 September 2015 v Pakistan

Domestic team information
- Years: Team
- 2009–2015: Mountaineers
- 2006–2009: Easterns
- 2004–2005: Midlands
- 2003–2004: Manicaland
- 2001–2003: Mashonaland

Career statistics
Competition	Test	ODI	T20I	FC
Matches	4	164	35	82
Runs scored	107	1,406	94	2,756
Batting average	15.28	16.73	7.83	21.53
100s/50s	0/0	0/4	0/0	1/15
Top score	45	68*	13*	115*
Balls bowled	753	8,571	749	14,284
Wickets	10	133	26	217
Bowling average	41.00	46.90	33.00	29.99
5 wickets in innings	0	1	0	8
10 wickets in match	0	0	0	2
Best bowling	3/60	5/36	3/25	7/56
Catches/stumpings	2/–	50/–	6/–	33/–
- Source: ESPNcricinfo, 10 November 2015

Prosper Utseya (born 26 March 1985 in Harare, Zimbabwe) is a retired Zimbabwean cricketer, who plays all formats of the game. He captained Zimbabwe from 2006 to 2010. He bowls right-arm off break and is a useful right-hand batsman. Utseya has not played any form of cricket since 2015.

== Early life ==
Rising from the ranks of township cricket in Harare's Highfield suburb, Utseya attended Churchill School, the cradle of many black Zimbabwean players, thanks to Zimbabwe Cricket Union scholarships.

== Domestic career ==
Utseya was a promising talent at the school level and made his first-class debut as an opener for Mashonaland A at the age of 15. He scored a fifty in a tight situation in just his second Logan Cup match against Manicaland a day before his 16th birthday and soon moved into the Under-19 and Zimbabwe A sides with some notable bowling performances along the way.

In 2004, he was moved to Manicaland to strengthen the provincial side there, and was selected for the CFX Academy. His maiden first-class five-wicket haul, 5/32, came against Manicaland in October of that year.

Utseya has been a force to be reckoned with in Zimbabwean domestic cricket. His spin-bowling partnership with Timycen Maruma has resulted in a series of domestic titles, and in 2008-09 his ten-wicket haul helped Easterns clinch a thrilling one-wicket victory in a low-scoring contest against Northerns at Alexandra Sports Club in Harare that secured the Logan Cup. Utseya enjoyed a steady, if unspectacular, domestic season in 2009–10, though his franchise, Mountaineers dominated the first-class scene.

== International career ==
While his initial place in the national team owed much to the withdrawal of several white players after Heath Streak's sacking as captain, Utseya more than earned his place subsequently. He continued to hold a place in a weakened national side and took up the captaincy from Terry Duffin in 2006.

Utseya's bowling during the tour to West Indies in May 2006 where his flight and spin belied his lack of experience and years. He was consistently able to stem the flow of runs in the middle overs, and he provided two of the series highlights and one when he comprehensively beat Brian Lara with successive deliveries in the first match in Trinidad and the other his remarkable diving, juggling boundary catch in the second.

Utseya is the first and joint world record holder for conceding the fewest runs (six runs) in a T20 International after bowling the complete quota of overs (four overs is the maximum quota in a T20 match). Utseya tendered his resignation as national captain after the side's disappointing performance at the T20 World Cup in May 2010 saying that he was stepping down in the interest of the team's future development. He led Zimbabwe in 67 one-day internationals, with 20 victories, and all 10 of the Twenty20 internationals the team has played.

Utseya took a hat-trick against South Africa at Harare Sports Club and became the second Zimbabwean to claim a hat-trick when he dismissed three South African batsmen in consecutive deliveries in the third One-Day International match of the Tri-series in August 2014. Utseya accounted for the wickets of Quinton de Kock, Rilee Rossouw and David Miller. In process, he also took his career best figure and ended his innings with a figure of 5/36

== Bowling action ==
In August 2014, Utseya reported for a suspect bowling action following the third ODI against South Africa in Bulawayo. Utseya was the fourth offspinner to have been reported for a suspect action over the last few months; the others were Sachithra Senanayake, Kane Williamson, and Saeed Ajmal.

Utseya was ranked 15th in the ICC ODI Bowling Rankings in September 2006. He has a reputation for being an extremely parsimonious bowler, albeit with less wicket taking prowess. In a Cricinfo article from August 2006, he had the lowest economy rate (3.84) amongst all spinners in the history of ODI cricket. In comparison, the economy rates for Muttiah Muralitharan and Harbhajan Singh at the same time were 3.85 and 4.11 respectively.

== Controversies ==
Utseya claims that he became a victim of racism during the 2015 ICC Cricket World Cup, and slammed allegations against former Zimbabwe cricketer Alistair Campbell, managing director of Zimbabwe Cricket, over the appointment of an "all-white" coaching staff and administration. He claimed that Campbell had "personal issues" against him, and was thus not included in the starting XI in any of the world cup games, despite being in the squad.

== See also ==
- List of One Day International cricket hat-tricks

Preceded by Terry Duffin	Zimbabwean ODI captain 2006–2010	Succeeded by Elton Chigumbura
