= South African cricket team in Zimbabwe in 2007–08 =

The South African national cricket team toured Zimbabwe in August 2007 and played a three-match series of Limited Overs Internationals (LOI) which South Africa won 3–0 against the Zimbabwean national cricket team. South Africa were captained by Graeme Smith and Zimbabwe by Prosper Utseya.
