= 1993–94 Logan Cup =

Cricket tournament

- Administrator(s): Zimbabwe Cricket
- Cricket format: First-class cricket (3 days)
- Tournament format(s): League system and Final
- Champions: Mashonaland Under-24s (1st title)
- Participants: 4
- Matches: 7
- Most runs: 386 – Wayne James (Matabeleland)
- Most wickets: 20 – John Rennie (Matabeleland)

The 1993–94 Logan Cup was the first competing of the Logan Cup as a first-class cricket competition. It was held in Zimbabwe from 14 January – 20 March 1994. It was won by Mashonaland Under-24s, who drew with Matabeleland in the final, and won courtesy of having finished top in the league stage of the competition. Wayne James of Matabeleland was named the player of the series for his batting.

== Points table ==
Team	Pld	W	L	DWF	DLF	Bat	Bwl	Pts
Mashonaland Under-24s	3	1	0	1	1	12	29	56
Matabeleland	3	1	0	1	1	12	22.5	49.5
Mashonaland Country Districts	3	0	1	1	1	15	20	40
Mashonaland	3	0	1	1	1	10	22.5	37.5
Source:CricketArchive

== Final ==
18–20 March 1994
Scorecard

Mashonaland Under-24s	v	Matabeleland
286 (107.1 overs); Gavin Rennie 76; John Rennie 3/78 (26.1 overs)		140 (64.1 overs); Wayne James 52*; David Stannard 4/23 (12 overs)
245 (124.5 overs); Stuart Carlisle 54; Guy Whittall 6/34 (25.5 overs)

Match drawn
Harare Sports Club, Harare
Umpires: GC Batte and Kantilal Kanjee

- Matabeleland won the toss and elected to field.
