= Cricket in South Africa =

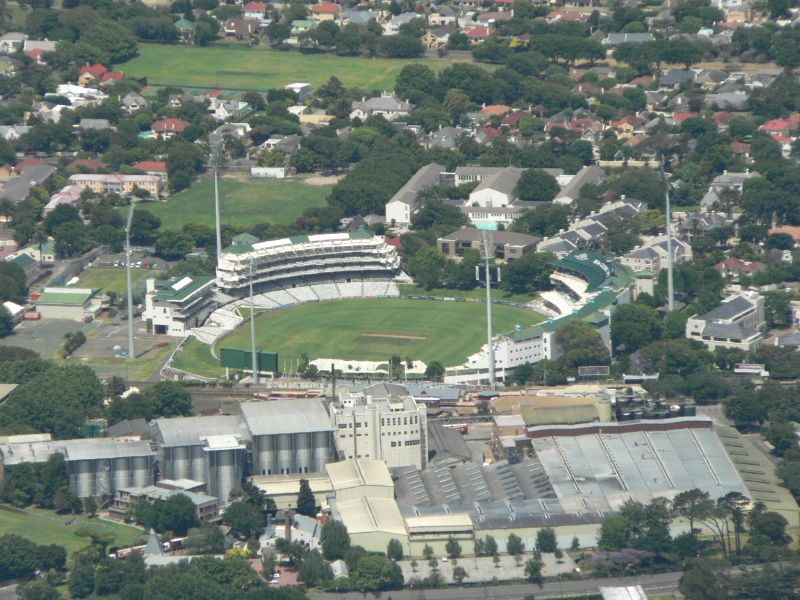
- Newlands Cricket Ground in Cape Town
- Country: South Africa
- Governing body: Cricket South Africa
- National teams: South Africa Men; South Africa Women; South Africa U-19 Men; South Africa U-19 Women; South Africa A Men
- Nickname: The Proteas
- First played: 1808
- Clubs: 6 (SA20)

National competitions
- List: First Class Cricket; CSA 4-Day Domestic Series; CSA Provincial Competitions; List A Cricket; CSA One-Day Cup; CSA Provincial Competitions; CSA Women's One-Day Cup; T20 Cricket; CSA T20 Challenge; CSA Provincial T20 Cup; CSA Women's T20 Challenge; Women's T20 Super League

Club competitions
- List: SA20

International competitions
- List: Men's national team; ICC World Test Championship; ICC Cricket World Cup: Semi-finals (1992, 1999, 2007, 2015, 2023); ICC World Twenty20: Runners-up (2024); ICC Champions Trophy: Champions (1998); Commonwealth Games: Champions (1998); Men's U-19 national team; Under-19 Cricket World Cup:Champions (2014); Women's national team; Women's Cricket World Cup: Semi-finals (2000, 2017, 2022); Women's Cricket World Cup Qualifier:Champions (2008); ICC Women's World Twenty20: Runners-up (2023, 2024); Commonwealth Games: Group Stage (2022); Women's U-19 national team; Under-19 Women's T20 World Cup: Group Stage (2023)

Cricket is the third most popular sport in South Africa (behind football and rugby union). Traditionally played by English-speaking Whites, Indians, Coloureds and more recently, the Black community, the sport is now listed in the top two most popular among all race groups. Since the end of apartheid, a higher proportion of white players have come from Afrikaans-speaking backgrounds as well.

Like other Commonwealth cricket playing nations, the sport was first introduced in South Africa by the British in the early 19th Century, with the game becoming firmly established by the 1880s. Governed by Cricket South Africa, both the professional and amateur game possess a high standard of domestic cricket, with the season running from October to March each year.

South Africa is one of the world's leading cricket-playing nations and is one of the 12 countries sanctioned by the International Cricket Council to play Test Cricket. In 2012, South Africa became the first team to top the ICC rankings in all three formats of the game.

In 2003, the country hosted the Cricket World Cup, and in 2007, the inaugural World Twenty20. Along with Namibia and Zimbabwe, South Africa will jointly host the upcoming 2027 Cricket World Cup.

== History ==
=== Emergence ===
In 1814, the Cape Colony was formally ceded to Britain by the Dutch after two previous occupations by British forces during the French Revolutionary and Napoleonic Wars. It is believed that cricket was first introduced to South Africa during the first occupation, an expedition led by General Sir James Craig. An accompanying officer, Charles Anguish, had been an early member of the Marylebone Cricket Club (MCC), playing 32 first-class matches before he departed for the Cape in 1795. It is supposed that Anguish organised inter-military matches upon his arrival. The earliest definite reference to cricket is dated to 1808, during the second occupation. The Cape Town Gazette and African Advertiser carried a notice that:

"A grand match at cricket will be played for 1,000 dollars aside on Tuesday, January 5, 1808, between the officers of the artillery mess, having Colonel Austen of the 60th Regiment, and the officers of the Colony, with General Clavering. The wickets are to be pitched at 10 o'clock."

The first club known to have been formally established was at Port Elizabeth in 1843, with the land allocated still in use today as St George's Park. In 1876, Port Elizabeth presented the 'Champions Bat', a competition between towns in the Cape; initially Cape Town, Grahamstown, King William's Town and Port Elizabeth itself, the rudimental beginnings of domestic cricket in South Africa.

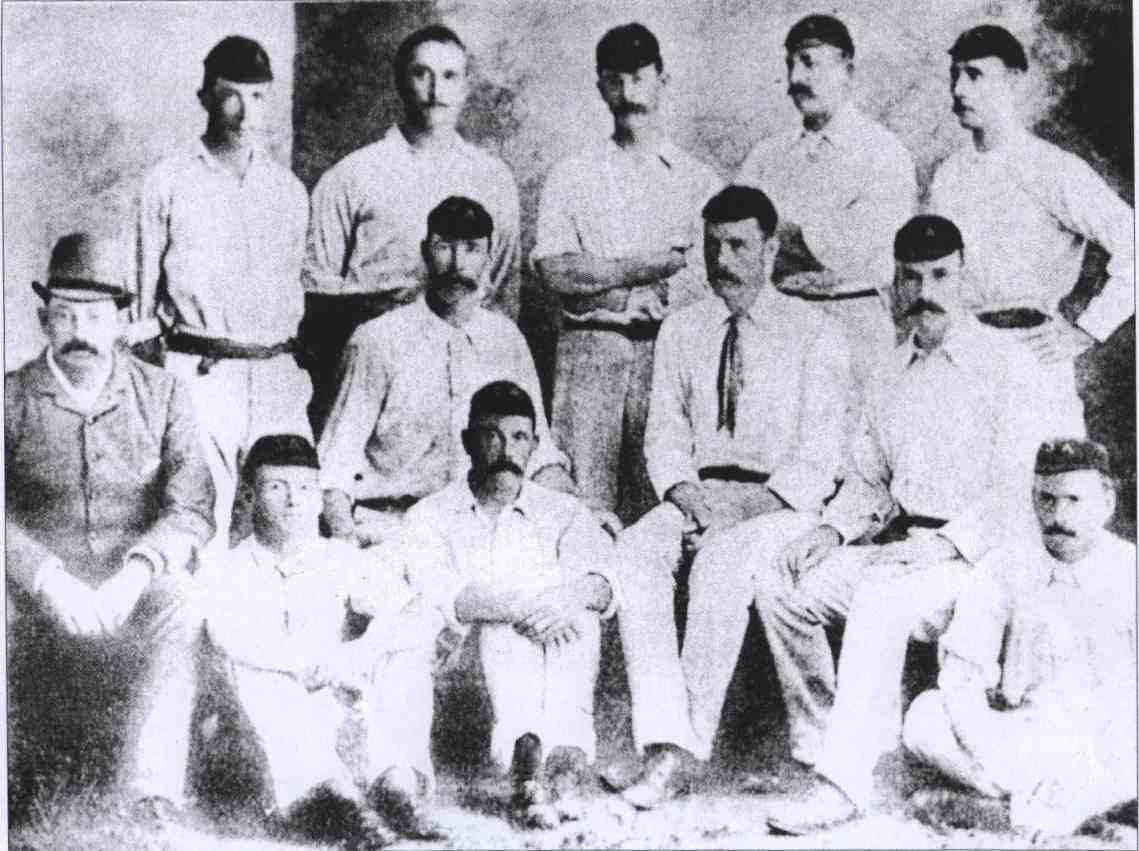
South African XI 1888-89

The years 1888 and 1889 are pivotal ones for the emergence of modern cricket in South Africa. Two major venues were presented, Newlands in Cape Town and the Old Wanderers in Johannesburg, and an English team arrived for the first overseas tour of South Africa. In March 1889, two matches were played between England and South African XI, in what retrospectively would be determined to be both the inaugural Test played by South Africa, and the inaugural first-class match played in South Africa. South Africa lost both matches but became the world's third Test nation.

In December 1889, first-class domestic cricket began, albeit on a challenge only footing, when Port Elizabeth Cricket Club hosted Natal at St George's Park. Sir Donald Currie, the founder of the Castle Shipping Line who had sponsored the English tour, donated a trophy for the domestic champions. The 'Currie Cup' was first awarded to Kimberley at the end of the 1889-90 season. From the 1892-93 season, first-class cricket gradually emerged into the more familiar province-based competition in a championship format.

In 1907, Abe Bailey, the President of the South African Cricket Association, wrote a letter to the Marylebone Cricket Club's secretary, Sir Francis Lacey, and suggested the formation of an 'Imperial Cricket Board'. Responsible for the formulation of rules, regulation and overall governance of international matches played between Australia, England and South Africa. Although Australia initially rejected the arrangement Bailey continued his lobbying, and during Australia's tour of England in 1909, he eventually received agreement. On 15 June 1909, representatives from Australia, England and South Africa met at Lord's and founded the Imperial Cricket Conference. Subsequent meetings were held that agreed on rules amongst the nations and the first Tri-Test series was to be held in England in 1912.

=== 1910–1960 ===
The South African War, as well as the First World War, disrupted cricket and led to its suspension. After the Armistice in 1918, South African cricket resumed and continuously toured and received visits from England and Australia. Although having a somewhat disappointing period during the 1920s, in the final pre-war decade South Africa became a consistently high-quality and competitive team. During this time, cricket in South Africa began to spread outside the British settler diaspora, particularly in the Afrikaner and Indian communities. However, cricket remained strictly, although not legally, segregated with various national bodies governing cricket for the different racial groups. First-class domestic and international cricket was white only, and would only play other white Test nations (India and the West Indies joined the ICC in 1926).

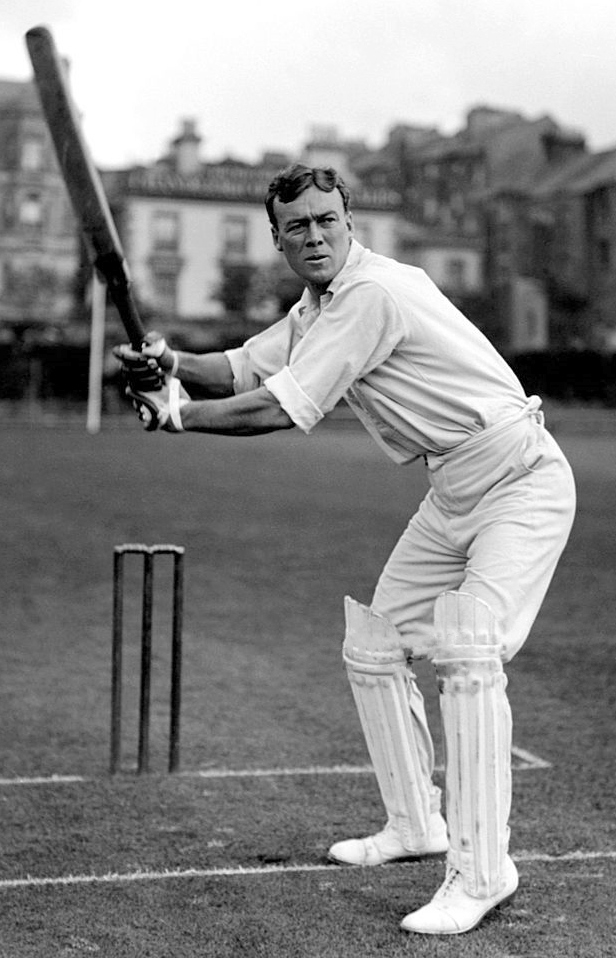
Jimmy Sinclair, who holds the record for the highest strike rate in the history of Test cricket

Suspended once again during the Second World War, cricket in South Africa resumed after 1945. The introduction of apartheid (separation of racial groups by strict legal enforcement) following the 1948 General Election did not immediately affect the sport, and it continued to prosper and welcome visiting teams.

=== International isolation 1961–1991 ===
South Africa left the Commonwealth after a successful 1960 South African republican referendum on 31 May 1961, and by extension, they also left the ICC as membership was entwined. Despite the rules being changed to allow "associate members" in 1964, South Africa did not reapply but continued to play against Australia, England and New Zealand without much difficulty.

As decolonisation accelerated, and international moral public opinion began to change away ideas of racial, particularly white, superiority, South Africa became increasingly isolated. The anti-apartheid movement demanded that South Africa face boycotts, including in sport. Within the ICC, non-white members, particularly India, protested loudly about the discrimination their own diaspora received in South Africa, including the policies of apartheid which now legally barred non-whites from playing Test cricket for South Africa and the refusal of accepting touring teams that fielded non-whites. In 1970, the ICC banned South Africa from participating in internationally recognised cricket. This decision, arguably when South Africa was the strongest team in the world, cut short the Test careers of hugely talented players, such as Graeme Pollock, Barry Richards and Mike Procter. Many promising players later emigrated in order to play, whilst others never played Test cricket despite strong domestic first-class records.

The effect of the international boycott had significant impacts on the domestic game and cricket development. Standards, attendances and participation fell, along with South Africa missing out on the revolutionary changes to the game. The beginnings of limited-overs matches, including the new World Cup, cost South Africa financially, as well as evolutionary. Although South Africa tried to desegregate cricket in 1976 with the formation of a non-racial governing body, the South African Cricket Union (SACU), the ICC maintained their ban.

Throughout the 1980s, ‘Rebel Tours' were sponsored in which international, although not official, teams would tour South Africa playing Test and limited-overs. Between 1982 and 1990, seven tours were staged by four teams; Australia, England, the West Indies and Sri Lanka. Players joining ‘rebel tours' ran considerable risks to their own careers and reputations, with many facing a limited or lifetime ban from cricket upon their return. As an incentive, at a time when cricketers were not paid a great deal, the SACU offered substantial amounts of money to rebel teams.

=== International return ===
In July 1991, as South Africa negotiated a political way toward majority rule, the ICC reinstated South Africa as a Test nation and authorised the playing of international matches. By November, South Africa had played its first ODI, and first sanctioned match since 1970, against India in Calcutta, before playing their first Test match against the West Indies in April 1992. During the rest of the decade and early 21st Century, the national team gained a reputation as "chokers" and underachievers due to reaching the semi-finals of the World Cup four times but failing to progress, despite having hugely talented players, such as Hansie Cronje, as well as favourable win percentages. In 1998, South Africa won the inaugural ICC Knockout Trophy in Bangladesh - the tournament was later rebranded as the Champions Trophy. Also in 1998, South Africa defeated Australia in the final of the Commonwealth Games played in Malaysia. Although South Africa had spent 22 years away from ICC regulated cricket, the national team quickly re-confirmed their place as a highly competitive team, with particular notoriety in fast bowling.

Domestically, cricket in South Africa responded to the political changes that had happened with the election of the ANC in 1994, and the return of South Africa to the Commonwealth of Nations on 1 June 1994 as a Commonwealth republic, particularly the changing of team names in the Castle Cup (formerly Currie). Orange Free State become Free State (1995–96), Eastern Transvaal became Easterns (1995–96), Western Transvaal became North West (1996–97), Transvaal became Gauteng (1997–98), Northern Transvaal became Northerns (1997–98) and Natal became KwaZulu-Natal (1998–99). The competition itself changed name for sponsorship reasons, first becoming the Castle Cup in 1990-91, before being the SuperSport Series in 1996-97.

=== 21st Century ===
In the 21st Century, cricket in South Africa has evolved and significantly diversified. In 2004-05, the format of South African domestic cricket changed entirely and broke with the past. The former 11 provincial teams were replaced by six, fully professional, franchise teams. Cape Cobras, the Eagles (later the Knights), the Warriors, the Lions, the Titans and the Dolphins were created and represented the highest form of domestic cricket, both in first-class and limited-overs. In 2021, domestic cricket returned to the more traditional provincial based format, with 15 first class teams across two divisions.

In July 2006, Ashwell Prince at the age of 29, became the first non-white man to captain the South African cricket team when he deputised for Graeme Smith. Racial quotas were first introduced and later rescinded in 2007, although were re-established in 2016, despite being highly controversial, particularly criticised by the Institute of Race Relations in South Africa. A South African team must now have an average minimum of six non-white players, of which two must be black African, in matches over the season. This has led to some highly capable white players emigrating from South Africa claiming they were disadvantaged by discrimination. Kevin Pietersen, who was born in Pietermaritzburg, left South Africa to play for England, later becoming one of the world's best batsman.

Since readmission in 1991, South Africa has been a consistently strong team and the equal of any Test nation. The early 2010s saw a period of Test dominance, achieving top position in the ICC rankings in 2012. Eight days later, in August 2012, South Africa became the first team to top the rankings in all three formats of the game. The top spot was later regained by South Africa in 2014 after losing it to Australia earlier in the year.

In 2025, South Africa finally ended their long wait for a major global title by winning the ICC World Test Championship, shedding the 'choker' label. Defeating Australia by five wickets, South Africa scored the joint-second highest run chase in Test Cricket at Lord's.

=== South African women ===
The South African Women's Team made their Test debut in 1960 against England, becoming the fourth team to play at such a level. The ICC boycott on South African cricket also affected the women's game, with the team not playing an international fixture until 1997. Only 12 ICC Women's Tests have been played by South Africa, winning only once, and the last being played in 2014. As the game has developed, the ODI and T20 have become far more popular and financially rewarding, pushing Women's Test cricket to the edge of viability. Playing their first ODI against Ireland in 1997, South Africa have a 50% win rate, being semi-finalists twice, in the 2000 and 2017 World Cup. In T20, the team first competed in Australia in 2007, and have since played over 100 matches and six World Cups. Being semi-finalists twice, in 2014 and 2020, the team are currently ranked fifth by the ICC, with a win rate of 44%.

== Administration ==
Cricket South Africa (CSA) is the governing body for professional and amateur cricket in South Africa. In 1991, the separate South African Cricket Union and the South African Cricket Board merged to form the United Cricket Board of South Africa (UCB), ending enforced racial separation governance in South African cricket. Cricket South Africa was formed in 2002 and initially ran parallel to the UCB, before becoming the sole governing body in 2008. As an affiliate of the South African Sports Confederation and Olympic Committee (SASCOC), a full member of the International Cricket Council (ICC) and African Cricket Association, CSA administers all levels of cricket in South Africa, including the national teams in all three formats for both men and women. CSA organises and manages visiting tours to South Africa, as well as administering domestic cricket. A large part of CSA's effort is investing in youth and grassroots development, particularly in deprived areas.

In recent years, Cricket South Africa has faced a huge amount of internal upheaval and disorganisation that has significantly damaged the reputation of South African cricket at home and abroad, as well as even threatening ICC membership. In December 2019, CEO Thabang Moroe was suspended pending the outcome of an independent forensic audit, before being dismissed in August 2020 for "serious misconduct". In September 2020, the South African Sports Confederation and Olympic Committee (Sascoc) announced that they had suspended Cricket South Africa due to "maladministration and malpractices", and had taken over cricket operations in the country. It was later announced that the acting CEO, Kugandrie Govender, would herself be suspended, pending the outcome of a hearing into allegations of misconduct.

Since the first reports came to light of the severe mismanagement, the organisation has come under heavy criticism from sponsors, players, and the wider cricket community over governance issues. The International Cricket Council has announced it could suspend South Africa due to government interference in the sport, which is against ICC rules.

== National teams ==
The South Africa national cricket team is governed by the Cricket South Africa (CSA) and is a member of the Africa Cricket Association (ACA). Since 1909, the CSA has been affiliated with ICC, the international governing body for world cricket. In 1997, the CSA became one of the founding members of the ACA.

=== Performance ===
The following list includes the performance of all of South Africa's national teams at major competitions.

==== Men's senior team ====
The South African senior national team had several successes and is considered the best team in Africa, and one of the best in world cricket.

Tournament	Appearance in finals	Last appearance	Best performance
ICC World Test Championship	1 out of 3	2023–25	Champions (2023–25)
ICC Men's Cricket World Cup	0 out of 13	2023	Semi-finals (1992, 1999, 2007, 2015, 2023)
ICC Men's T20 World Cup	1 out of 9	2024	Runners-up (2024)
ICC Champions Trophy	1 out of 8	2025	Champions (1998)
Commonwealth Games	1 out of 1	1998	Champions (1998)

==== Women's senior team ====
Tournament	Appearance in finals	Last appearance	Best performance
ICC Women's Cricket World Cup	0 out of 12	2022	Semi-finals (2000, 2017, 2022)
ICC Women's T20 World Cup	2 out of 9	2024	Runners-up (2023, 2024)
Women's Cricket World Cup Qualifier	2 out of 5	2017	Champions (2008)
Commonwealth Games	0 out of 1	2022	Group Stage (2022)

==== Men's U-19 team ====
Tournament	Appearance in finals	Last appearance	Best performance
ICC Under-19 Cricket World Cup	3 out of 15	2024	Champions (2014)

==== Women's U-19 team ====
Tournament	Appearance in finals	Last appearance	Best performance
Under-19 Women's T20 World Cup	1 out of 2	2025	Runners-up (2025)

== Organisation of cricket in modern South Africa ==
=== International cricket ===
==== Men's national team ====
- Test: Having hosted and played their first international first-class game against England in 1888-89, South Africa developed into a competitive team by the start of the 20th century. Arguably the best team in the world in 1970 when the ICC imposed an international ban due to apartheid, since readmittance in 1991 South Africa have reasserted themselves as a strong team. Although previously holding the number one position in the international rankings, as of 2025, the Proteas are currently ranked second in the ICC Rankings.

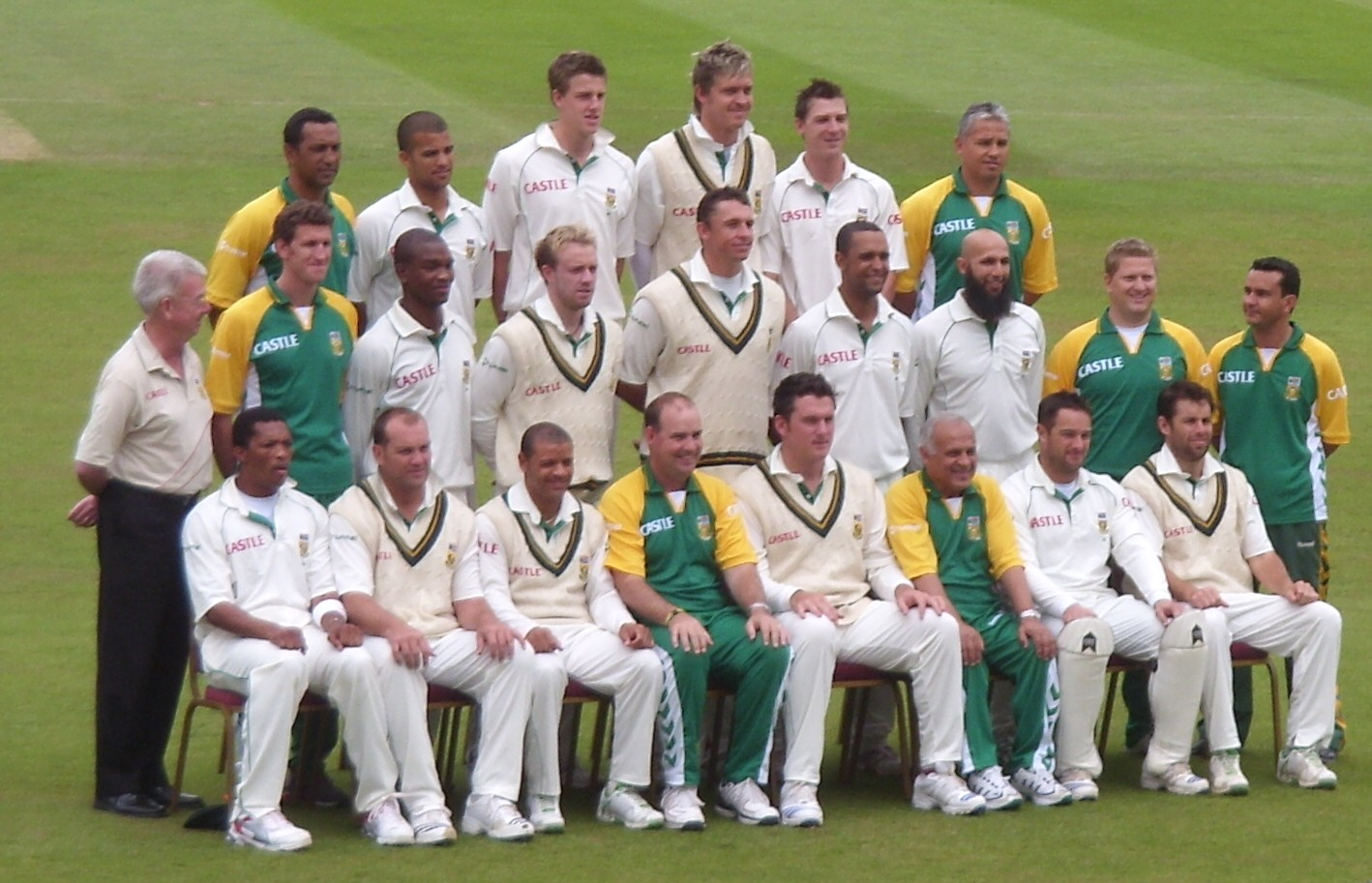
The South African touring cricket team at The Oval, 4th Test, 7–11 August 2008

- ODI: Playing their first One Day International against India soon after readmittance in 1991, South Africa have reached the ODI World Cup Semi-Finals four times, most recently in 2015, but never progressed further. The team's wider fortunes have also fluctuated and as of 2025, currently sit sixth in the ICC ODI Rankings.
- T20I: South Africa played their first T20I against New Zealand in 2005. Much like the other national squads, the T20I teams' fortunes have varied and have been close to silverware, coming second in 2024, and reaching the semi-finals three times. As of 2025, they are sixth in the ICC T20I Rankings.

==== Women's national team ====
- Test: Making their debut in 1960 against England, the women's team did not play any international fixtures between 1972 and 1997. Despite being the oldest form of women's cricket in South Africa, the Proteas have played just 14 Test matches, with the most recent being in 2024 and winning only one against the Netherlands in 2007. T20 has taken on a far more prominent and financially rewarding role, almost ending women's Test cricket as a viable entity.
- ODI: The women's team played their first One Day International against Ireland in 1997, and have a current win rate of roughly 50% over nearly 200 matches. Playing in six Women's World Cups, the Proteas have been semi-finalists twice, in 2000 and 2017, although never progressing further. South Africa are currently third in the ICC World ODI rankings.
- T20I: The Proteas' first T20I was in 2007 against Australia, and have since played over 100 matches. Competing in 6 Women's T20 World Cups, South Africa have been semi-finalists in 2014 and in 2020. Ranked fifth in the ICC table, South Africa have a T20I win rate of 44%.

=== Domestic cricket ===
==== Men's domestic cricket ====
===== First class competitions =====
- CSA 4-Day Domestic Series
- Three-Day Competition

===== Limited overs competitions =====
- CSA One-Day Cup
- One-Day Competition

===== Twenty20 competitions =====
- SA20
- CSA T20 Challenge
- CSA Provincial T20 Cup

South Africa's first-class competition began in 1889–1890, initially on a challenge only basis rather than a structured championship. Sir Donald Currie, who had sponsored the first English tour of South Africa earlier that year, donated a trophy for the domestic champions, the Currie Cup. From the 1892-93 season, first-class domestic cricket in South Africa gradually emerged into the more familiar province-based champion season. This competition format, with occasional changes and additions, survived until the 2004/05 season when the domestic structure was remodelled across all three formats to introduce six, entirely professional, franchise teams. The eleven provincial Currie Cup teams, as well as South Western Districts and KwaZulu-Natal Inland, continued to compete separately in the Provincial Three-Day Challenge, which remained a first-class competition, although on a semi-professional level and no longer the top level of red-ball cricket in South Africa.

In 2021, Cricket South Africa announced a return to the traditional province based domestic structure. 15 first-class teams now play in two divisions, determined by promotion and relegation.

Eight teams make up the first division, with 16 contracted players each, and seven teams the second division, with 11 contracted players each, taking the total to 205.

CSA believes that the new format will provide more opportunities for players to compete at a high standard just below international cricket, in turn providing a wider talent pool for the national selectors. It is hoped that wider selection of teams at the highest domestic level will help increase playing opportunities of all races, particularly those currently underrepresented.

South Africa's major domestic competitions are the CSA 4-Day Series (four day first-class competition) and the Momentum One Day Cup (List A one-day competition). Division 1 will take part in the Mzanzi Super League (T20 competition), whilst Division 2 compete in a separate T20 tournament.

==== Women's domestic cricket ====
===== Limited overs competitions =====
- CSA Women's One-Day Cup

===== Twenty20 competitions =====
- CSA Women's T20 Challenge
- Women's T20 Super League

For women, CSA Provincial Cricket is currently the top level of cricket in South Africa, however, it remains semi-professional. Since 2017, South African women have played in the Women's T20 Super League. Further developing the women's game at a high level, CSA has said that the competition will allow top performing players from across the under-19s and provincial cricket to continue and improve domestic standards, as well as ultimately strengthening the national limited-over teams. As of 2021, there have not been any reports to indicate women's domestic cricket will be affected by the restructuring announced for the men's game.

==== Recreational and development ====
CSA, the sports governing body in South Africa, devotes considerable resources towards youth participation and development. As the vast majority of South African schools do not have the financially expensive, but necessary, cricket support infrastructure in place, CSA provides multiple regional and district programs, often via their Performance Centres. The KFC Mini-Cricket programme is usually the first introduction to cricket that many school children, both boys and girls, will enjoy. Running between the ages of four and thirteen, more than 126,000 school children have participated in this programme, while the number of coaches and schools involved have increased to nearly 14,000 and 7,000 respectively.

National inter-provincial competitions are played at under-13, under-15, under-17 and under-19 levels for boys, and at under-15 and under-19 levels for girls. Through the Talent Acceleration Programme, the best players, particularly those who are disadvantaged, can be selected without any bias against their background. Multiple financial initiatives are available that provide support to deprived young cricketers. From Youth to International progression, CSA nourishes potential talent through various Provincial and Regional Academies, as well as the National Academy and the High-Performance Centre.

== Stadiums ==
Ground Name	City	Location	First Used	Last Used	First-Class Games	List A Games	Twenty20 Games	Notes
Boland Bank Park	Paarl	Boland	1994–95	2010–11	82	111	4	Hosted eight ODIs
Buffalo Park	East London	Border	1988–89	2010–11	122	144	12	Hosted Test and ODI matches
St George's Park	Port Elizabeth	Eastern Province	1888–89	2010–11	343	215	30	Hosted Test, ODI and Twenty20 International matches.
Willowmoore Park	Benoni	Easterns	1923–24	2010–11	115	107	4	Hosted 18 ODIs.
Springbok Park	Bloemfontein	Free State	1989–90	2010–11	133	162	22	Hosted Test, ODI and Twenty20 International matches.
Ellis Park	Johannesburg	Gauteng	1946–47	1955–56	39	0	0	Hosted six Tests between 1948 and 1954. No longer used for cricket.
New Wanderers Stadium	Johannesburg	Gauteng	1956–57	2010–11	344	265	45	Hosted Test, ODI and Twenty20 International matches.
Old Wanderers	Johannesburg	Gauteng	1890–91	1945–46	113	0	0	Hosted 22 Tests before being replaced by the New Wanderers Stadium.
De Beers Diamond Oval	Kimberley	Griqualand West	1973–74	2010–11	153	124	9	Hosted 10 ODIs and a Twenty20 International.
Kingsmead	Durban	KwaZulu Natal	1922–23	2010–11	354	229	54	Hosted Test, ODI and Twenty20 International matches.
Lord's	Durban	KwaZulu Natal	1897–98	1921–22	22	0	0	Hosted four Test matches between 1910 and 1921. Replaced by Kingsmead (see above) as Durban's Test venue.
City Oval	Pietermaritzburg	KZN Inland	1894–95	2010–11	71	33	0	Hosted two matches in the 2003 World Cup.
Moses Mabhida Stadium	Durban	KwaZulu Natal	2010–11		2	0	0	Hosted one Twenty20 International in 2011 between South Africa and India.
Senwes Park	Potchefstroom	North West	1994–95	2010–11	70	92	7	Hosted one Test match between South Africa and Bangladesh in 2002. Also hosted 16 ODIs.
Centurion Park	Centurion	Northerns	1986–87	2010–11	137	189	41	Hosted Test, ODI and Twenty20 International matches.
Newlands	Cape Town	Western Province	1893–94	1908–09	422	216	38	Hosted Test, ODI and Twenty20 International matches.

== International competitions hosted ==
Competition	Edition	Winner	Final	Runners-up	South Africa's position	Venues	Final venue	Stadium
Men's senior competitions
Under-19 Men's Cricket World Cup	1998 Under-19 Cricket World Cup	England	241/6 (50 overs) - 242/3 (46 overs)	New Zealand	Semi-finals	18 (in 14 cities)	Wanderers Stadium	
ICC Men's Cricket World Cup	2003 Cricket World Cup	Australia	359/2 (50 overs) – 234 (39.2 overs)	India	Group Stage	15 (in 15 cities)	Wanderers Stadium	
ICC Men's T20 World Cup	2007 World Twenty20	India	157/5 (20 overs) – 152 (19.3 overs)	Pakistan	Super 8s	3 (in 3 cities)	Wanderers Stadium	
Under-19 Men's Cricket World Cup	2020 Under-19 Cricket World Cup	Bangladesh	177 (47.2 overs) - 170/7 (42.1 overs)	India	Quarter-finals	7 (in 3 cities)	JB Marks Oval	
Women's senior competitions
ICC Women's Cricket World Cup	2005 Women's Cricket World Cup	Australia	215/4 (50.0 overs) – 117 (46.0 overs)	India	Group Stage	10 (in 5 cities)	Centurion Park	
Women's Cricket World Cup Qualifier	2008 Women's Cricket World Cup Qualifier	South Africa	61 (24.3 overs) – 62/2 (13.4 overs)	Pakistan	Champions	4 (in 2 cities)	Stellenbosch University Ground No. 1	
ICC Women's T20 World Cup	2016 ICC Women's World Twenty20	India	68 (17.1 overs) – 69/3 (14 overs)	England	Super 6	3 (in 2 cities)	JB Marks Oval	
ICC Women's T20 World Cup	2023 Women's T20 World Cup	Australia	156/6 (20 overs) – 137/6 (20 overs)	South Africa	Runners-up	3 (in 3 cities)	Newlands Cricket Ground	

== Performance in international competitions ==
A red box around the year indicates tournaments played within South Africa

Key
Champions
Runners-up
Semi-finals

=== Men's team ===
==== ICC World Test Championship ====
Year	League stage										Final Host	Final	Final Position
Year	Pos	Matches					Ded	PC	Pts	PCT	Final Host	Final	Final Position
Year	Pos	P	W	L	D	T	Ded	PC	Pts	PCT	Final Host	Final	Final Position
2019–21	5/9	13	5	8	0	0	6	600	264	44	Rose Bowl, England	DNQ	5th
2021–23	3/9	15	8	6	1	0	0	180	100	55.6	The Oval, England	DNQ	3rd
2023–25	1/9	13	9	3	1	0	0	144	100	69.44	Lord's, England	Won	1st

==== ICC Cricket World Cup ====
World Cup record
Host and Year	Round	Position	P	W	L	T	NR	Squad
(England) 1975	Not eligible, South Africa were banned due to apartheid							
(England) 1979	Not eligible, South Africa were banned due to apartheid							
(England) (Wales) 1983	Not eligible, South Africa were banned due to apartheid							
(India) (Pakistan) 1987	Not eligible, South Africa were banned due to apartheid							
(Australia) (New Zealand) 1992	Semi-finals	3/9	9	5	4	0	0	Squad
(India) (Pakistan) (Sri Lanka) 1996	Quarter-final	5/12	6	5	1	0	0	Squad
(England) (Republic of Ireland) (Netherlands) (Scotland) (Wales) 1999	Semi-finals	3/12	11	7	4	0	0	Squad
(South Africa) (Zimbabwe) (Kenya) 2003	Group Stage	8/14	6	3	2	0	1	Squad
(Cricket West Indies) 2007	Semi-finals	4/16	11	6	5	0	0	Squad
(India) (Sri Lanka) (Bangladesh) 2011	Quarter-final	6/14	7	5	2	0	0	Squad
(Australia) (New Zealand) 2015	Semi-finals	4/14	8	5	3	0	0	Squad
(England) (Wales) 2019	Group Stage	7/10	9	3	5	0	1	Squad
(India) 2023	Semi-finals	3/14	10	7	3	0	0	Squad
(South Africa) (Zimbabwe) (Namibia) 2027	Qualified as co-hosts							
(India) (Bangladesh) 2031	Qualification to be decided							
Total	0 Titles	-	77	46	29	0	2	-

==== ICC T20 World Cup ====
T20 World Cup record
Host and Year	Round	Position	P	W	L	T	NR	Squad
(South Africa) 2007	Super 8s	5/12	5	4	1	0	0	Squad
(England) 2009	Semi-finals	3/12	6	5	1	0	0	Squad
(Cricket West Indies) 2010	Super 8s	6/12	5	2	3	0	0	Squad
(Sri Lanka) 2012	Super 8s	8/12	5	2	3	0	0	Squad
(Bangladesh) 2014	Semi-finals	4/16	5	3	2	0	0	Squad
(India) 2016	Semi-finals	5/16	4	2	2	0	0	Squad
(United Arab Emirates) (Oman) 2021	Super 12s	5/16	5	4	1	0	0	Squad
(Australia) 2022	Super 12s	5/16	5	2	2	1	0	Squad
(Cricket West Indies) (United States) 2024	Runners-up	2/20	9	8	1	0	0	Squad
(India) (Sri Lanka) 2026	TBD							
(Australia) (New Zealand) 2028	TBD							
(England) (Wales) (Republic of Ireland) (Scotland) 2030	TBD							
Total	0 Titles	-	49	32	16	0	1	-

==== ICC Champions Trophy ====
Champions Trophy record
Host and Year	Round	Position	P	W	L	T	NR	Squad
(Bangladesh) 1998	Champions	1/9	3	3	0	0	0	Squad
(Kenya) 2000	Semi-finals	4/11	2	1	1	0	0	Squad
(Sri Lanka) 2002	Semi-finals	4/12	3	2	1	0	0	Squad
(England) 2004	Group stage	6/12	2	1	1	0	0	Squad
(India) 2006	Semi-finals	3/12	4	2	2	0	0	Squad
(South Africa) 2009	Group stage	7/8	3	1	2	0	0	Squad
(England) (Wales) 2013	Semi-final	4/8	4	1	2	1	0	Squad
(England) (Wales) 2017	Group stage	5/8	3	1	2	0	0	Squad
(Pakistan) (United Arab Emirates) 2025	Semi-final	3/8	4	2	1	1	0	Squad
(India) 2029	TBD							
Total	1 Titles	-	24	12	11	1	0	-

==== Commonwealth Games ====
Commonwealth Games record
Year	Round	Position	P	W	L	T	NR	Squad
(Malaysia) 1998	Champions	1/16	5	5	0	0	0	Squad
Total	1 Title	-	5	5	0	0	0	-

=== Women's team ===
==== ICC Women's Cricket World Cup ====
World Cup record
Year	Round	Position	Played	Won	Lost	Tie	NR
(England) 1973	Not eligible, South Africa were banned due to apartheid						
(India) 1978	Not eligible, South Africa were banned due to apartheid						
(New Zealand) 1982	Not eligible, South Africa were banned due to apartheid						
(Australia) 1988	Not eligible, South Africa were banned due to apartheid						
(England) 1993	Not eligible, South Africa were banned due to apartheid						
(India) 1997	Quarter-finals	5/11	6	3	3	0	0
(New Zealand) 2000	Semi-finals	4/8	8	4	4	0	0
(South Africa) 2005	Group Stage	7/8	7	1	4	0	2
(Australia) 2009	Group Stage	8/8	3	0	3	0	0
(India) 2013	Super 6s	7/8	9	2	7	0	0
(England) 2017	Semi-finals	4/8	8	4	3	0	1
(New Zealand) 2022	Semi-finals	3/8	8	5	2	0	1
(India) 2025							
Total	0 Title	-	49	19	26	0	4

==== ICC Women's T20 World Cup ====
T20 World Cup record
Year	Round	Position	Played	Won	Lost	Tie	NR
(England) 2009	Group Stage	7/8	3	0	3	0	0
(Cricket West Indies) 2010	Group Stage	6/8	3	0	3	0	0
(Sri Lanka) 2012	Group Stage	7/8	3	1	2	0	0
(Bangladesh) 2014	Semi-finals	4/10	5	3	2	0	0
(India) 2016	Group Stage	7/10	4	1	3	0	0
(United Arab Emirates) 2018	Group Stage	6/10	4	2	2	0	0
(Australia) 2020	Semi-finals	2/10	5	4	0	0	1
(South Africa) 2023	Runners-up	2/10	6	3	3	0	0
(United Arab Emirates) 2024	Runners-up	2/10	6	4	2	0	0
(England) 2026							
Total	0 Title	-	39	18	20	0	1

==== ICC Women's Championship ====
Women's Championship record
Year	Round	Position	GP	W	L	D	T	NR
2014-16	Group Stage	6/8	21	8	12	0	0	1
2017-20	Group Stage	3/8	21	10	6	0	1	4
2022-25	Group Stage	4/10	24	12	11	0	0	1
Total	0 Title	-	66	30	29	0	1	6

==== ICC Women's Cricket World Cup Qualifier ====
Women's Cricket World Cup Qualifier record
Year	Round	Position	GP	W	L	D	T	NR
2003	Did not participate, already qualified for World Cup							
2008	Champions	1/8	5	5	0	0	0	0
2011	Group Stage	4/10	6	4	2	0	0	0
2017	Runners-up	2/10	9	8	1	0	0	0
2021	Did not participate, already qualified for World Cup							
Total	1 Title	-	20	17	3	0	0	0

==== Commonwealth Games ====
Commonwealth Games record
Year	Round	Position	GP	W	L	T	NR
(England) 2022	Group Stage	5/8	3	1	2	0	0
Total	0 Title	-	3	1	2	0	0

=== Men's U-19 team ===
==== U-19 World Cup ====
South Africa's U19 World Cup record
Year	Result	Pos	№	Pld	W	L	T	NR
(Australia) 1988	Ineligible – not an ICC member							
(South Africa) 1998	Semi-finals	3rd	16	6	5	1	0	0
(Sri Lanka) 2000	First round	9th	16	8	5	0	0	3
(New Zealand) 2002	Runner-up	2nd	16	8	5	3	0	0
(Bangladesh) 2004	Second round	7th	16	6	3	3	0	0
(Sri Lanka) 2006	First round	11th	16	5	2	3	0	0
(Malaysia) 2008	Runner-up	2nd	16	6	4	2	0	0
(New Zealand) 2010	Quarter-finals	7th	16	6	5	1	0	0
(Australia) 2012	Semi-finals	3rd	16	6	5	1	0	0
(United Arab Emirates) 2014	Champions	1st	16	6	6	0	0	0
(Bangladesh) 2016	First round	11th	16	6	3	3	0	0
(New Zealand) 2018	Quarter-finals	5th	16	6	4	2	0	0
(South Africa) 2020	Quarter-finals	8th	16	6	3	3	0	0
(Cricket West Indies) 2022	Qualified							
(South Africa) 2024	Qualified							
Total				75	50	22	0	3

=== Women's U-19 team ===
==== Under-19 Women's World Cup ====
South Africa's U19 Twenty20 World Cup Record
Year	Result	Pos	№	Pld	W	L	T	NR
(South Africa) 2023	Super 6	6th	16	5	4	1	0	0
(Malaysia) 2025	Runner-up	2nd	16	9	7	1	0	1
(Bangladesh) (Nepal) 2027								
Total				14	11	2	0	1

== Popularity ==
Cricket traditionally has been the most popular South African sport for English-speaking whites, as well as the Indian community, although the latter was not able to compete at the top level during the apartheid era. While the popularity remains high, a larger proportion of white players now come from Afrikaner-speaking backgrounds, such as Hansie Cronje, AB de Villiers, Quinton de Kock, Heinrich Klaasen and Francois du Plessis, since 1991. As the colour bar was removed from South African sport, from the late 1990s cricket has grown at a substantial rate in other racial groups, particularly black African. Omar Henry became the first Coloured person to play a Test match for South Africa in 1992, with Makhaya Ntini being the first black African in 1998. Originally seen as a game for "white gentlemen" only, the country has since spawned skillful cricketers who are people of colour, such as Hashim Amla, Vernon Philander, Kagiso Rabada, Keshav Maharaj, Tabraiz Shamsi, Reeza Hendricks and Lungi Ngidi.

== Attendances ==
The average attendance per top-flight T20 league season and the cricket club with the highest average attendance:

Season	League average	Best club	Best club average
2024	16,467	Joburg Super Kings	24,852

== See also ==
- Sport in South Africa
- Sporting boycott of South Africa during the apartheid era § Cricket
