= 1998–99 Logan Cup =

- Administrator(s): Zimbabwe Cricket
- Cricket format: First-class cricket (3 days)
- Tournament format(s): League system
- Champions: Matabeleland (2nd title)
- Participants: 3
- Matches: 3
- Most runs: 268 – Guy Whittall (Matabeleland)
- Most wickets: 7 – Andrew Whittall (Matabeleland)

The 1998–99 Logan Cup was a first-class cricket competition held in Zimbabwe from 5 January 1999 – 21 January 1999. It was won by Matabeleland, who were the only team to complete two matches, winning one and drawing the other, to top the table.

== Points table ==
Team	Pld	W	L	D	A
Matabeleland	2	1	0	1	0
Mashonaland	2	0	0	1	1
Mashonaland A	2	0	1	0	1
Source:CricketArchive
