= James Douglas Logan =

South African businessman (1857–1920)

James Douglas Logan (26 November 1857 – 30 July 1920) was a Scottish-born South African cricket patron, who was one of the founding fathers of cricket in South Africa.

Born in Reston on 26 November 1857 to a Scottish railway clerk, Logan was educated at Reston House School. He began working for the North British Railway at the age of 14.

Logan joined the crew of a ship travelling to Australia, but it was damaged by a storm and put into Simon's Town, Cape Colony. He decided to stay and made his way to Cape Town. Drawing on his experience in railway work, he joined the Cape Government Railways in 1877, and was rapidly promoted. He became a private caterer to the railway service, eventually building up an extensive group of refreshment rooms.

He quickly became a large landholder in the Matjiesfontein area. In January 1894, Logan was elected to the Legislative Assembly for the constituency of Worcester.

The premier domestic first-class cricket competition in Zimbabwe, the Logan Cup, is named after him.

James Douglas Logan died of sclerosis of the liver, ascites and syncope on 30 July 1920.
