= Brighton Watambwa =

Zimbabwean cricketer (born 1977)

Personal information
- Full name: Brighton Tonderai Watambwa
- Born: 9 June 1977 (age 49); Salisbury, Rhodesia
- Nickname: Bulb, Spikey, Slim
- Batting: Right-handed
- Bowling: Right-arm fast-medium
- Role: Bowler

International information
- National side: Zimbabwe
- Test debut: 19 April 2001 v Bangladesh
- Last Test: 28 February 2002 v India

Domestic team information
- Years: Team
- 1997/98–2000/01: Mashonaland A
- 1999/00–2001/02: Mashonaland

Career statistics
Competition	Test	FC	LA
Matches	6	21	12
Runs scored	11	70	15
Batting average	3.66	5.83	2.14
100s/50s	0/0	0/0	0/0
Top score	4*	14*	6*
Balls bowled	931	3,076	598
Wickets	14	66	9
Bowling average	35.00	26.06	59.44
5 wickets in innings	0	3	0
10 wickets in match	0	0	0
Best bowling	4/64	6/96	2/37
Catches/stumpings	0/–	5/–	3/–
- Source: ESPNcricinfo, 11 June 2015

Brighton Tonderai Watambwa (born 9 June 1977) is a Zimbabwean cricketer who in 2014 captained the Belgium national cricket team.

A right-arm fast-medium bowler, Watambwa played six Tests for Zimbabwe between April 2001 and March 2002, taking 14 wickets. Domestically, he alternated between playing for Mashonaland and Mashonaland A.

Following a contract dispute with the Zimbabwe Cricket Union, Watambwa emigrated to the USA in the autumn of 2002. After obtaining a degree from the University of Miami, he moved to Belgium in 2009, taking on a full-time job with Johnson & Johnson in Brussels until 2015.
