= Ian Nicolson =

Zimbabwean cricketer (born 1986)

Personal information
- Full name: Ian Alan Nicolson
- Born: 9 October 1986 (age 40); Harare, Zimbabwe
- Batting: Right-handed
- Bowling: Right-arm fast-medium

International information
- National side: Zimbabwe
- ODI debut (cap 110): 30 September 2010 v Ireland
- Last ODI: 22 October 2010 v South Africa

Domestic team information
- Years: Team
- 2004/05: Midlands
- 2006/07: North West
- 2007/08: Southerns
- 2010/11: Mid West Rhinos

Career statistics
Competition	ODI	FC	LA	T20
Matches	2	23	20	9
Runs scored	14	139	47	10
Batting average	7.00	9.92	6.71	–
100s/50s	0/0	0/0	0/0	0/0
Top score	14	26	20	7*
Balls bowled	72	3,305	910	180
Wickets	2	63	28	9
Bowling average	59.00	33.15	29.60	29.44
5 wickets in innings	0	0	1	0
10 wickets in match	0	0	0	0
Best bowling	1/44	4/33	5/28	3/18
Catches/stumpings	0/–	7/–	7/–	0/–
- Source: CricketArchive, 4 January 2013

Ian Alan Nicolson (born 9 October 1986) is a Zimbabwean cricketer who took part in the 2006 U-19 Cricket World Cup. He currently plays first-class, List A and Twenty20 cricket for the Mid West Rhinos cricket team in Zimbabwe.

Nicolson has represented Zimbabwe in ODI cricket, playing two matches.

He, along with Shingirai Masakadza, holds the record for the highest last-wicket stand in ODIs for Zimbabwe (60)
