= Mashonaland A cricket team =

Mashonaland A
Team information
- Established: 1997 (First-class)
- Last match: 2002
- Home venue: Alexandra Sports Club

The Mashonaland A cricket team was a first-class cricket team representing the Mashonaland province in Zimbabwe. They competed in the Logan Cup from 1997 to 2002, though they did not compete in the 1999–2000 competition. The club played their home matches at the Alexandra Sports Club.

== First-class record ==
Season	Position	Leading run-scorer	Runs	Leading wicket-taker	Wickets
1997–98	2nd	Murray Goodwin	156	Andy Blignaut	7
1998–99	2nd	Trevor Penney	134	Angus Mackay	6
2000–01	2nd	Trevor Gripper	272	Brighton Watambwa	20
2001–02	3rd	Mark Vermeulen	393	David Mutendera	13
