= 1996–97 Logan Cup =

- Administrator(s): Zimbabwe Cricket
- Cricket format: First-class cricket (3 days)
- Tournament format(s): League system
- Champions: Mashonaland (2nd title)
- Participants: 2
- Matches: 3
- Most runs: 308 – Grant Flower (Mashonaland)
- Most wickets: 14 – Paul Strang (Mashonaland)

The 1996–97 Logan Cup was a first-class cricket competition held in Zimbabwe from 4 October 1996 – 24 November 1996. It was won by Mashonaland, who won two of the three games to top the table.

== Points table ==
Team	Pld	W	L	D
Mashonaland	3	2	0	1
Matabeleland	3	0	2	1
Source:CricketArchive
