= International Wanderers in Rhodesia in 1975-76 =

An International Wanderers team, made up of international players from multiple countries, toured Rhodesia in 1975. They played three matches against the Rhodesia cricket team and two other tour matches against local teams.

== Squad ==
The following players played one or more matches for the International Wanderers

Player	Date of birth	Batting style	Bowling style	Country
Phil Edmonds	8 March 1951	Right hand	Slow left-arm orthodox	England
Geoff Greenidge	26 May 1948	Right hand	Right arm legbreak	Barbados
Frank Hayes	6 December 1946	Right hand	Right arm medium	England
Budhi Kunderan	2 October 1939	Right hand	Wicketkeeper	India
Mohammad Ilyas	19 March 1946	Right hand	Right arm legbreak	Pakistan
Chris Old	22 December 1948	Right hand	Right arm medium-fast	England
Graham Roope	12 July 1946	Right hand	Right arm medium	England
John Shepherd	9 November 1943	Right hand	Right arm medium	Barbados
John Snow	13 October 1941	Right hand	Right arm fast	England
Roger Tolchard	15 June 1946	Right hand	Wicketkeeper	England
Glenn Turner	26 May 1947	Right hand	Right arm offbreak	New Zealand
Barry Wood	26 December 1942	Right hand	Right arm medium	England
Younis Ahmed	20 October 1947	Left hand	Left arm medium	Pakistan

== Tour matches ==
21 September 1975
(50-over match)
Scorecard

Rhodesia; 235/7 (50 overs)	v	International Wanderers; 223/7 (50 overs)
Brian Davison 101; John Snow 2/32 (10 overs)		Glenn Turner 51; Robin Jackman 3/37 (10 overs)

Rhodesia won by 12 runs
Police B Ground, Salisbury

- Toss not known

24 September 1975
(50-over match)
Scorecard

International Wanderers; 262/6 (50 overs)	v	Midlands Invitation XI; 183
Glenn Turner 68		Brian Davison 91

International Wanderers won by 79 runs
Gwelo Sports Club, Gwelo

- Toss not known

27-29 September 1975
(3-day match)
Scorecard

Rhodesia	v	International Wanderers
244 (77.1 overs); Brian Davison 66; Phil Edmonds 4/65 (24 overs)		221 (80.1 overs); Graham Roope 77; John Traicos 4/67 (22.1 overs)
230 (88.1 overs); Brian Davison 78; Chris Old 5/38 (21.1 overs)		249 (62.5 overs); Glenn Turner 74; Duncan Fletcher 4/78 (18 overs)

Rhodesia won by 4 runs
Queens Sports Club, Bulawayo
Umpires: R Batchelor and J. A. Gillman

1 October 1975
(50-over match)
Scorecard

International Wanderers; 214/6 (50 overs)	v	Manicaland; 215/6 (48.5 overs)
Frank Hayes 93*		Keith Tattersall 59

Manicaland won by 5 wickets
Umtali Sports Club, Umtali

- Toss not known

4-6 October 1975
(3-day match)
Scorecard

Rhodesia	v	International Wanderers
210 (102.2 overs); Duncan Fletcher 70; John Snow 4/36 (23 overs)		284/9d (96 overs); Phil Edmonds 73; John Traicos 3/68 (26 overs)
181 (76.3 overs); Paddy Clift 64; Chris Old 4/47 (23.3 overs)		108/1 (40.2 overs); Barry Wood 56

International Wanderers won by 9 wickets
Police B Ground, Salisbury
Umpires: Patrick Latham and Austin Wilmot

== Aftermath ==
The Caucasian Geoff Greenidge, who played for both Barbados and the West Indies had his career ended for participating in the tour. His participation angered the Guyanese government, which refused him entry to the country to play domestic cricket.
