= Craig Wishart =

Zimbabwean cricketer

Personal information
- Full name: Craig Brian Wishart
- Born: 9 January 1974 (age 52); Salisbury, Rhodesia
- Batting: Right-handed
- Bowling: Right-arm offbreak
- Role: Batsman

International information
- National side: Zimbabwe (1995–2005)
- Test debut (cap 29): 13 October 1995 v South Africa
- Last Test: 15 August 2005 v New Zealand
- ODI debut (cap 44): 26 August 1996 v Australia
- Last ODI: 24 August 2005 v New Zealand

Domestic team information
- Years: Team
- 1994–1999: Mashonaland
- 2000–2005: Midlands

Career statistics
Competition	Test	ODI
Matches	27	90
Runs scored	1,098	1,719
Batting average	22.40	23.22
100s/50s	1/5	2/5
Top score	114	172*
Balls bowled	–	12
Wickets	–	0
Bowling average	–	–
5 wickets in innings	–	–
10 wickets in match	–	–
Best bowling	–	–
Catches/stumpings	15/–	26/–
- Source: Cricinfo, 11 February 2017

Craig Brian Wishart (born 9 January 1974) is a former Zimbabwean cricketer, who played Tests and ODIs for 10 years. He played domestic cricket for Mashonaland and Midlands as well as the Zimbabwean national team.

He was later self-employed in Zimbabwe and played social cricket there.

== International career ==
Wishart made his Test debut in 1995 in Harare. He has a Test record batting score of 114, with a 22.40 batting average, and a one-day record batting score of 172 not out, achieved against Namibia in the 2003 Cricket World Cup, the sixth highest in World Cup history and the highest scored by a Zimbabwean player in ODIs.

Wishart retired in 2005, citing "stress from the problems in local cricket", and was one of many senior internationals to announce their retirements in protest against the local governing body's controversial decisions during the early 2000s.
