= 2026–27 Logan Cup =

Cricket tournament

- Dates: 5 December 2026 – March 2027
- Administrator: Zimbabwe Cricket
- Cricket format: First-class cricket (4 days)
- Tournament format: Double round-robin
- Participants: 5
- Matches: 20

The 2026–27 Logan Cup was the 33th edition of the Logan Cup, a first-class cricket competition in Zimbabwe. which started on 5 December 2026 and concluded in March 2027. The Southern Rocks were the defending champions.

== Teams and standing ==
=== Points table ===
Pos	Team	Pld	W	L	D	Pts
1	Southern Rocks	0	0	0	0	0
2	Mashonaland Eagles	0	0	0	0	0
3	Mid West Rhinos	0	0	0	0	0
4	Mountaineers	0	0	0	0	0
5	Matabeleland Tuskers	0	0	0	0	0

First match(es) will be played: 5 December 2026. Source: Cricinfo
- 10 points for a win, 6 for a tie, 5 for a draw, and 0 for a loss. An extra 2 points are awarded for an innings victory.
- Batting bonus points: 1 point each for reaching 200, 250, 300, and 350 runs in each innings.
- Bowling bonus points: 1 point each for taking 3, 5, 7, and 9 wickets in each innings

=== Match summary ===
The total team points at the end of each round are listed.

Team	Round										Total
Team	1	2	3	4	5	6	7	8	9	10	Total
Southern Rocks
Mashonaland Eagles
Mid West Rhinos
Mountaineers
Matabeleland Tuskers

Win	Loss	Draw	Bye	Abandoned
