= David Mutendera =

Zimbabwean cricketer (born 1979)

Personal information
- Full name: David Travolta Mutendera
- Born: 25 January 1979 (age 47)
- Height: 198 cm (6 ft 6 in)
- Batting: Right-handed
- Bowling: Right-arm fast-medium
- Role: Bowler

Career statistics
Competition	Test	ODI
Matches	1	9
Runs scored	10	20
Batting average	5.00	10.00
100s/50s	0/0	0/0
Top score	10	10
Balls bowled	84	390
Wickets	0	9
Bowling average	–	37.11
5 wickets in innings	–	0
10 wickets in match	–	0
Best bowling	–	3/23
Catches/stumpings	0/–	1/–
- Source: CricInfo, 11 February 2006

David Travolta Mutendera (born 25 January 1979) is a former Zimbabwean international cricketer who played one Test match and nine One Day Internationals. He now teaches cricket and football at St John's College in Harare. He is currently the Convener of Selectors for the Zimbabwe national cricket team.

A tall seam bowler, with a height of almost two metres, he got bounce off the pitch and had the off cutter as his stock ball. He had little success at international level, however, as his Test debut saw him bowl 14 overs against New Zealand - coming on as third change in the first innings and not bowling at all in the second. Batting at number eleven, he made 10 and 0 in Zimbabwe's seven-wicket loss. In ODIs he got nine wickets in his nine matches spread over two years, although six of them came against the bottom-ranked Bangladesh team. He also dismissed Australian wicket-keeper Adam Gilchrist twice, however.

He had played 20 matches (not all first-class) for Zimbabwe A, but failed to get into the domestic sides, and has not played a first class game since April 2004, when he took five for 62 for Mashonaland in the first innings during a 329-run win against his old team Midlands.
