= Andy Whittall =

Zimbabwean cricketer and educationist (born 1973)

Andrew Whittall
Personal information
- Full name: Andrew Richard Whittall
- Born: 19 March 1973 (age 53); Umtali, Rhodesia
- Batting: Right-handed
- Bowling: Right-arm offbreak
- Relatives: GJ Whittall (cousin)

International information
- National side: Zimbabwe
- Test debut (cap 31): 11 September 1996 v Sri Lanka
- Last Test: 18 November 1999 v Sri Lanka
- ODI debut (cap 45): 3 September 1996 v Sri Lanka
- Last ODI: 30 January 2000 v England

Domestic team information
- Years: Team
- 1993–1996: Cambridge University
- 1996/97–1998/99: Matabeleland
- 1999/00: Manicaland

Career statistics
Competition	Test	ODI	FC	LA
Matches	10	63	62	87
Runs scored	114	168	985	318
Batting average	7.59	7.63	14.27	9.35
100s/50s	0/0	0/0	0/2	0/0
Top score	17	29	91*	29
Balls bowled	1,562	3,085	12,400	4,105
Wickets	7	45	134	68
Bowling average	105.14	50.02	49.35	44.13
5 wickets in innings	0	0	5	0
10 wickets in match	0	0	1	0
Best bowling	3/73	3/23	6/46	3/23
Catches/stumpings	8/–	21/–	41/–	32/–
- Source: Cricinfo, 12 April 2019

Andrew Richard Whittall (born 19 March 1973) is a former Zimbabwean international cricketer who played in 10 Test matches and 63 One Day Internationals between 1996 and 2000. He made his Test and ODI debuts against Sri Lanka in September 1996. He is the CEO of a company that runs a number of schools in Zambia.

== Cricket career ==
Whittall was born in Umtali, Rhodesia, and educated at Falcon College. He graduated from Trinity College, Cambridge with a degree in engineering and also earned four blues playing for the University cricket side. He played 34 matches in four seasons of first-class cricket for Cambridge University from 1993 to 1996, with best bowling figures of 5 for 67 and 6 for 46 against Essex in 1995, when he also captained the team.

He was selected to play Test cricket for Zimbabwe in September 1996, despite having played not yet played in the Zimbabwe first-class competition, the Logan Cup. He played first-class cricket for Manicaland and Matabeleland between 1996–97 and 1999–2000, also representing Zimbabwe in eight more Tests in this period. His best first-class figures in Zimbabwe were 6 for 151 for a Zimbabwe Cricket Union President's XI against the touring Sri Lankan team in 1999–2000. His best Test figures were 3 for 73 against Sri Lanka in Kandy in 1997–98.

== Education career ==
Whittall joined Tonbridge School in 2004 as the school's director of sport. He coached the first XI cricket team, and was also housemaster at the school's Ferox Hall. When the Tonbridge Society was created, which oversees the work of the Tonbridge School Foundation, he was appointed as its director, and served in that position until 2022, when he moved to Zambia. He led the school's "Excellence for All Campaign" from 2015 to 2019.

Whittall is the founding CEO of Educore Services, a company that, as of 2026, runs nine independent schools in Zambia.
