= Ian Engelbrecht =

Zimbabwean cricketer (born 1980)

Personal information
- Full name: Ian Andrew Engelbrecht
- Born: 23 July 1980 (age 46); Bulawayo, Matabeleland
- Batting: Right-handed
- Bowling: Slow left-arm orthodox
- Role: Bowler
- Source: ESPNcricinfo

Ian Andrew Engelbrecht (born August 23, 1980 in Bulawayo, Matabeleland is a Zimbabwean cricketer and rugby league Hooker for Tuks Rugby League. He has represented Matabeleland cricket team in 9 first-class matches and seven List A matches starting from 1998 to 2006. He is slow left-arm orthodox bowler who took 25 wickets in 2000–01 Logan Cup session but never full field his talent with team.
