= Richard Sims =

Zimbabwean cricketer (born 1979)

Personal information
- Full name: Richard William Sims
- Born: 23 July 1979 (age 47); Chinhoyi, Zimbabwe Rhodesia
- Batting: Right-handed
- Bowling: Right-arm offbreak
- Role: All-rounder

International information
- National side: Zimbabwe
- ODI debut: 23 November 2002 v Pakistan
- Last ODI: 10 July 2003 v South Africa

Domestic team information
- Years: Team
- 2001–2004: Manicaland

Career statistics
Competition	ODI	FC	LA
Matches	3	21	30
Runs scored	31	1,325	604
Batting average	31.00	36.80	25.16
100s/50s	0/0	2/8	0/3
Top score	24	204	87
Balls bowled	132	2,792	1,003
Wickets	0	30	20
Bowling average	–	58.36	38.25
5 wickets in innings	–	1	0
10 wickets in match	–	0	0
Best bowling	–	6/132	3/12
Catches/stumpings	1/–	21/–	13/–
- Source: ESPNcricinfo, 10 June 2015

Richard William Sims (born 23 July 1979) is a Zimbabwean cricketer. An allrounder, he bats in the middle order and bowls right-arm offbreak. He is a good driver of the ball and is a straight hitter.

== International career ==
Sims made his international debut in 2002 in a One-Day International (ODI) against Pakistan. Having gone into bat first, Pakistan reached 305–2 in 50 overs with Sims bowling 9 wicketless overs for 49. Sims then batted at ten and scored 7 not out as Zimbabwe notched up 295–9 in their 50 overs.

In 2004 he became involved in disputes with the ZCU board and Sims opted out of playing from Zimbabwe instead keeping his contract with his English club. He now plays for a Norfolk club, Swardeston. He also coaches cricket, hockey and rugby at Norwich School, working as a batting and bowling coach.

== Post Zimbabwean cricket ==
In 2000 he played for Helensburgh, west of Glasgow in Scotland. He was good with the ball and scored two hundreds and three nineties, averaging 51 with the bat for the season. He returned again in 2001, and despite having a great many matches rained off he managed three centuries. He has become a successful rugby coach, coaching Norwich School 1st XV to the Daily Mail vase 2010 final at Twickenham in and leading the U14's to Norfolk Cup victory in 2007.

== Sportsman ==
Sims was also a notable rugby player at scrum-half who represented Zimbabwe Schools. He had represented national rugby teams from junior school upwards.

He got injured on a tour of South Africa and it has affected his cricketing career and it's weakened his throw. As a result, he is forced to field in close during games. He gave up rugby to concentrate on cricket.
