= 1997–98 Logan Cup =

- Administrator(s): Zimbabwe Cricket
- Cricket format: First-class cricket (3 days)
- Tournament format(s): League system
- Champions: Mashonaland (3rd title)
- Participants: 3
- Matches: 3
- Most runs: 317 – Andy Flower (Mashonaland)
- Most wickets: 12 – John Rennie (Matabeleland)

The 1997–98 Logan Cup was a first-class cricket competition held in Zimbabwe from 28 August – 25 October 1997. It was won by the Mashonaland Cricket Team, who won both of their games to top the table.

== Points table ==
Team	Pld	W	L	D
Mashonaland	2	2	0	0
Mashonaland A	2	0	1	1
Matabeleland	2	0	1	1
Source:CricketArchive
