= 2000–01 Logan Cup =

National Zimbabwean first-class cricket competition

- Administrator(s): Zimbabwe Cricket
- Cricket format: First-class cricket (4 days)
- Tournament format(s): League system
- Champions: Mashonaland (5th title)
- Participants: 6
- Matches: 15
- Most runs: 501 – Dougie Marillier (Midlands)
- Most wickets: 25 – Ian Engelbrecht (Matabeleland)

The 2000–01 Logan Cup was a first-class cricket competition held in Zimbabwe from 16 February 2001 – 30 March 2001. It was won by Mashonaland, who won all five of their matches to top the table with 78 points.

== Points table ==
Team	Pld	W	L	D	A	Bat	Bwl	Adj	Pts
Mashonaland	5	5	0	0	0	7	12	–1	78
Mashonaland A	5	2	1	2	0	8	19	–7	50
Matabeleland	5	2	1	2	0	5	14	–3	46
Manicaland	5	1	2	1	1	5	14	–3.5	33.5
Midlands	5	1	2	1	1	5	10	0	33
CFX Academy	5	0	5	0	0	5	13	–0.5	17.5
Source:CricketArchive
