= 2003–04 Logan Cup =

- Administrator: Zimbabwe Cricket
- Cricket format: First-class cricket (4 days)
- Tournament format: League system
- Champions: Mashonaland (8th title)
- Participants: 4
- Matches: 12
- Most runs: 681 – Gregory Strydom (Matabeleland)
- Most wickets: 20 – Tatenda Taibu (Mashonaland)

The 2003–04 Logan Cup was a first-class cricket competition held in Zimbabwe from 12 September 2003 – 12 April 2004. It was won by Mashonaland, who won three of their six matches to top the table with 78 points.

== Race issues ==
The Sunday Telegraph released a report, citing political tensions as a factor in a possibility of no white players being permitted on the Zimbabwean national cricket team, with Heath Streak, along with 9 other white players being removed immediately prior to the Logan Cup, resulting in their absence from various teams during the '03-'04 Cup.

== Points table ==
Team	Pld	W	L	D	Bat	Bwl	Adj	Pts
Mashonaland	6	3	2	1	13	23	0	78
Matabeleland	6	3	2	1	12.5	22	0	76.5
Midlands	6	3	2	1	9.5	22	0	73.5
Manicaland	6	1	4	1	14.5	20	–3.5	30
Source:CricketArchive
