= 2001–02 Logan Cup =

- Administrator(s): Zimbabwe Cricket
- Cricket format: First-class cricket (4 days)
- Tournament format(s): League system
- Champions: Mashonaland (6th title)
- Participants: 6
- Matches: 15
- Most runs: 684 – Craig Evans (Mashonaland)
- Most wickets: 31 – Ray Price (Midlands)

The 2001–02 Logan Cup was a first-class cricket competition held in Zimbabwe from 15 February 2002 – 19 April 2002. It was won by Mashonaland, who won all five of their matches to top the table with 86 points.

== Points table ==
Team	Pld	W	L	D	Bat	Bwl	Adj	Pts
Mashonaland	5	5	0	0	16	15	–5	86
Midlands	5	4	1	0	14	20	0	82
Mashonaland A	5	2	2	1	10	19	–4	52
CFX Academy	5	1	3	1	6	15	0	36
Matabeleland	5	0	2	3	11	16	0	36
Manicaland	5	0	4	1	11	19	0	33
Source:CricketArchive
