= Gus Mackay =

Zimbabwean cricketer (born 1967)

Personal information
- Full name: Angus James Mackay
- Born: 13 June 1967 (age 59); Salisbury, Rhodesia
- Batting: Right-handed
- Bowling: Right-arm fast-medium
- Role: all-rounder

International information
- National side: Zimbabwe
- ODI debut (cap 62): 4 January 2001 v New Zealand
- Last ODI: 4 February 2001 v Australia

Domestic team information
- Years: Team
- 1998/99–2002/03: Mashonaland
- Source: CricketArchive, 3 March 2022

Angus James Mackay (born 13 June 1967) is a Zimbabwean sports administrator. He is a former chief executive of Cricket Scotland.

== Cricket career ==
Gus Mackay played for Zimbabwe Colts in England in 1984 and then Zimbabwe Schools. In 1986 he spent a year at Essex County Cricket Club before being sidelined with a serious ankle injury. He then joined English Midlands club sides Barnt Green and West Bromwich. He made his first-class debut in 1998–99 at the age of 31.

Mackay won a call-up to the Zimbabwe one-day side which toured Australia and New Zealand in 2000–01. He played three ODIs for Zimbabwe in 2001 as a seam bowler.

He was general manager of Mashonaland whilst working as a banker, and in 2006 he was appointed as chief executive at Sussex. At the end of the 2008 season he moved to Surrey as managing director of cricket.

== Administration career ==
Mackay is a former chief executive of Sussex County Cricket Club and Operations Manager of Leicestershire.

Between 2008 and 2010 Mackay was the managing director of Cricket of Surrey.

In 2011 Mackay was appointed the CEO of the Harlequins RL.

He served as managing director of the Premiership Rugby team Worcester Warriors (2017-2019) and chief executive of Cricket Scotland (2019-2022).
