= 2002–03 Logan Cup =

- Administrator(s): Zimbabwe Cricket
- Cricket format: First-class cricket (4 days)
- Tournament format(s): League system
- Champions: Mashonaland (7th title)
- Participants: 4
- Matches: 12
- Most runs: 625 – Mark Vermeulen (Matabeleland)
- Most wickets: 28 – Gavin Ewing (Matabeleland)

The 2002–03 Logan Cup was a first-class cricket competition held in Zimbabwe from 11 October 2002 – 28 April 2003. It was won by Mashonaland, who won four of their six matches to top the table with 92 points.

== Points table ==
Team	Pld	W	L	D	Bat	Bwl	Adj	Pts
Mashonaland	6	4	0	2	23	20	–5	92
Matabeleland	6	2	2	2	16	14	–0.5	59.5
Manicaland	6	2	4	0	19	19	–4	58
Midlands	6	1	3	2	16	19	–9.5	43.5
Source:CricketArchive
