= 2004–05 Logan Cup =

- Administrator: Zimbabwe Cricket
- Cricket format: First-class cricket (4 days)
- Tournament format: League system
- Champions: Mashonaland (9th title)
- Participants: 4
- Matches: 12
- Most runs: 642 – Brendan Taylor (Mashonaland)
- Most wickets: 27 – Graeme Cremer (Mashonaland)

The 2004–05 Logan Cup was a first-class cricket competition held in Zimbabwe from 26 October 2004 – 29 April 2005. It was won by Mashonaland, who won five of their six matches to top the table with 97 points.

== Points table ==
Team	Pld	W	L	D	Bat	Bwl	Pts
Mashonaland	6	5	1	0	17	20	97
Manicaland	6	3	2	1	16	22	80
Matabeleland	6	3	2	1	14	16	72
Midlands	6	0	6	0	7	23	30
Source:CricketArchive
