= Leon Soma =

Zimbabwean cricketer (born 1982)

Personal information
- Born: 25 February 1982 (age 44); Mutare, Zimbabwe
- Source: ESPNcricinfo, 8 December 2016

Leon Soma (born 25 February 1982) is a Zimbabwean former cricketer. He played twenty-three first-class matches between 1999 and 2004.

== Biography ==
Soma became interested in cricket at Hillcrest Preparatory School. He was coached by former Manicaland player Ryan Barbour. An all-rounder since his junior school years, he holds significant achievements including a best score of 57 against an elite English school team and six wickets against Springvale. These accomplishments led to his selection for the South Eastern Districts team for the national primary schools cricket week.

His tenure at Hillcrest College saw him record seven wickets against Eaglesvale School and a match-winning 116 not out against Watershed. Soma, primarily a number four batsman and occasional team captain, made his club cricket debut with Mutare Sports Club. His notable achievements included a score of 68 runs against Kwekwe.

After school in 1998, Soma briefly worked in reception and accountancy before joining the CFX Academy, inspired by Manicaland captain Mark Burmester. As a batsman, Soma prefers cover drives and pull shots and aspires to improve his first-class batting. His bowling specialties included outswinger delivery and cutting the ball off the seam.

== See also ==
- CFX Academy cricket team
