= Neil Ferreira =

Zimbabwean cricketer (born 1979)

Cricket information
- Batting: Left-handed
- Bowling: Right-arm offbreak

International information
- National side: Zimbabwe
- Only Test: 7 August 2005 v New Zealand

Career statistics
| Competition | Test | First-class |
|---|---|---|
| Matches | 1 | 40 |
| Runs scored | 21 | 2515 |
| Batting average | 10.50 | 34.93 |
| 100s/50s | 0/0 | 9/8 |
| Top score | 16 | 220* |
| Catches/stumpings | 0/– | 84/8 |
- Source: ESPNcricinfo, 7 June 2012

Neil Robert Ferreira (born 3 June 1979) is a Zimbabwean cricketer.

Having also tried his hand at sports including tennis, squash, and hockey, he made his name as a left-handed opening batsman for the academy and for Manicaland. He is also a wicket keeper. His first Test involvement was in the August 2005 Test against New Zealand.

Prior to playing for his country, Ferreira also played first-class cricket for Manicaland C.C., scoring an impressive 501 runs in the 1999–2000 season and also being the leading run scorer in the 2001–02 season with 650 runs. On 8 August 2005 Ferreira received his Zimbabwean test cap being the 70th cricketer to represent Zimbabwe. Ferreira opened the batting for Zimbabwe's first innings but only managed 5 runs off 9 balls, Zimbabwe was then dismissed for just 59 and New Zealand captain Stephen Fleming enforced the follow on and once again Ferreira opened the batting and was dismissed for 16 runs off 90 balls, Zimbabwe were then all out for 99.

Ferreira has raised three sons two of which were playing B-Grade for Great Southern Grammar School. Matthew Ferreira was an all-around right-hand batsman and right-arm leg spinner and Michael Ferreira is a top-order left-hand batsman and a handy right-arm medium pace. His third son Colin Ferreira partakes in other activities than cricket and plays numerous instruments.
