= Trevor Gripper =

Zimbabwean cricketer

Cricket information
- Batting: Right-handed
- Bowling: Right arm off-break

International information
- National side: Zimbabwe
- Test debut (cap 41): 14 October 1999 v Australia
- Last Test: 26 February 2004 v Bangladesh
- ODI debut (cap 68): 28 October 2001 v Pakistan
- Last ODI: 26 November 2003 v West Indies

Career statistics
Competition	Test	ODI	FC	LA
Matches	20	8	62	37
Runs scored	809	80	3515	921
Batting average	21.86	10.00	33.79	28.78
100s/50s	1/5	0/0	5/26	1/5
Top score	112	26	234	103
Balls bowled	793	120	4430	718
Wickets	6	2	78	15
Bowling average	84.83	38.00	31.87	39.93
5 wickets in innings	0	0	2	0
10 wickets in match	0	0	0	0
Best bowling	2/91	2/28	5/40	3/34
Catches/stumpings	14/–	4/–	56/–	18/–
- Source: Cricinfo, 14 May 2005

Trevor Raymond Gripper (born 28 December 1975) is a former Zimbabwean cricketer. He was born in 1975 in Salisbury (now Harare).

Gripper was an opening batsman, who once spent four hours 23 minutes inching his way to 28 in a match against England A. However, his off-spin bowling has also proved useful, and in first-class cricket he may fairly be considered an all-rounder, with his batting average above 33 and his bowling average below 32.

Gripper made his first-class debut for a Matabeleland Invitation XI during Worcestershire's 1996/97 tour of Zimbabwe, by scoring 45. However, he did not play another match at that level until the aforementioned game against England A in February 1999.

Gripper made his Test match debut in October 1999 against Australia at Harare; the selectors' decision was somewhat surprising since at the time Gripper had still not recorded a first-class century. He made 60 in the second innings. His maiden Test hundred came against Bangladesh in 2001, as Zimbabwe piled up 542/7 declared.

Although only taking six wickets in his Test career, he was notable as the bowler who dismissed Matthew Hayden for 380 runs (second highest runs scored in a Test match) in the first Test between Australia and Zimbabwe at Perth in October 2003.

He played domestic cricket for Matabeleland, Manicaland and Mashonaland, and it was for the latter that he made his highest first-class score - 234 against Manicaland, this performance brought him a recall to the Zimbabwe team for the 2003/04 tour of Australia.

He also played two seasons for Cranleigh Cricket Club in Surrey (1999 and 2004) totalling over 1,400 1st XI runs and 68 wickets.
