= Midlands cricket team =

Midlands
Team information
- Established: 1999 (First-class)
- Last match: 2005
- Home venue: Kwekwe Sports Club

The Midlands cricket team was a first-class cricket team representing the Midlands province in Zimbabwe. They competed in the Logan Cup from 1999 until the competition was revamped after the 2004–05 season. The club played their home matches at the Kwekwe Sports Club.

== First-class record ==
Season	Position	Leading run-scorer	Runs	Leading wicket-taker	Wickets
1999–2000	4th	Dougie Marillier	410	Ray Price	15
2000–01	5th	Dougie Marillier	412	Ray Price	18
2001–02	2nd	James Cornford	314	Ray Price	31
2002–03	4th	Sean Ervine	519	Ray Price	24
2003–04	3rd	Craig Wishart	349	Ed Rainsford	19
2004–05	4th	Dougie Marillier	412	Ian Nicolson	19
