= Manicaland cricket team =

Manicaland
Team information
- Established: 1999 (First-class)
- Last match: 2005
- Home venue: Mutare Sports Club

The Manicaland cricket team was a first-class cricket team representing the Manicaland province in Zimbabwe. They competed in the Logan Cup from 1999 until the format was revamped after the 2004–05 season. The club played their home matches at the Mutare Sports Club.

In 1975 Manicaland beat the International Wanderers team, made up of many then current and former Test match players, in a 50-over match by 5 wickets during their tour of Rhodesia.

== First-class record ==
Season	Position	Leading run-scorer	Runs	Leading wicket-taker	Wickets
1999–2000	Runners-up (1st in group stage)	Neil Ferreira	501	Gary Brent	17
2000–01	4th	Stuart Matsikenyeri	218	Gary Brent	23
2001–02	6th	Neil Ferreira	650	Leon Soma	14
2002–03	3rd	Richard Sims	596	Gary Brent	27
2003–04	4th	Trevor Gripper	432	Blessing Mahwire	18
2004–05	2nd	Dion Ebrahim	573	Blessing Mahwire	24
