= Mashonaland cricket team =

Cricket team in Zimbabwe

The Mashonaland cricket team was a first-class cricket team representing the Mashonaland province in Zimbabwe. They competed in the Logan Cup from 1994 until the format was revamped in 2007. James Kirtley played for Mashonaland during the 1996/1997 season. Andy Flower played for Mashonaland in 1994, 1995 and 2003.

The club played most of its home games at the Harare Sports Club ground.

== Honours ==
- Logan Cup (9) -

1994–95, 1996–97, 1997–98, 1999–2000, 2000–01, 2001–02, 2002–03, 2003–04, 2004–05
