= Matabeleland cricket team =

Matabeleland cricket team was a first-class cricket team representing the Matabeleland province in Zimbabwe. They competed in the Logan Cup from 1994 until the format was revamped in 2007.

The side played its home games at both the Queens Sports Club and Bulawayo Athletic Club in Bulawayo.

== Honours ==
- Logan Cup (2) — 1995–96, 1998–99
