= Deaths in March 2006 =

The following is a list of notable deaths in March 2006.

Entries for each day are listed alphabetically by surname. A typical entry lists information in the following sequence:

- Name, age, country of citizenship at birth, subsequent country of citizenship (if applicable), reason for notability, cause of death (if known), and reference.

== March 2006 ==
=== 1 ===
- Annette von Aretin, 85, German TV personality.
- Joëlle Aubron, 46, French member of Action Directe, lung cancer.
- Harry Browne, 72, American libertarian writer and presidential candidate for the United States Libertarian Party, amyotrophic lateral sclerosis.
- Ronald Anthony Cross, 68, American science fiction writer.
- Ted Daffer, 76, American football player (Tennessee Volunteers, Chicago Bears).
- Mack Easley, 89, American politician and judge in New Mexico, former Democratic lieutenant governor of New Mexico (1963—1966).
- Alexander Fol, 72, Bulgarian historian of ancient Greece, former Minister of Education.
- O. Milton Gossett, 80, American advertising executive, former CEO Saatchi & Saatchi Compton Worldwide.
- Johnny Jackson, 54, American singer and musician, former drummer of The Jackson 5, stabbing.
- Reidar Liaklev, 88, Norwegian speed skater, Olympic champion (1948).
- Josef Muskita, 81, Indonesian Olympic sailor (1960),
- Peter Osgood, 59, English footballer, heart attack.
- Ray Poole, 86, American baseball player (Philadelphia Athletics).
- Jenny Tamburi, 53, Italian actress in 1970s B-movies and casting director of TV-series.
- Jack Wild, 53, British actor (Oliver!, H. R. Pufnstuf, Robin Hood: Prince of Thieves), oral cancer.

=== 2 ===
- Madeleine Cosman, 68, American scholar of medieval Europe.
- Leopold Gratz, 75, Austrian politician, former mayor of Vienna.
- Phyllis Huffman, 61, American casting director (Million Dollar Baby, Unforgiven, Mystic River).
- Willie Kent, 70, American blues bassist, cancer.
- Jiří Kodeš, 73, Czech canoeist and Olympian (1960).
- Rachel Mellon Walton, 107, American philanthropist.

=== 3 ===
- Ivor Cutler, 83, Scottish humorist, author, singer, and poet.
- Floyd Gass, 79, American college football coach (Oklahoma State University).
- Umberto Gerli, 80, Italian Olympic ice hockey player (1948).
- William Herskovic, 91, Hungarian escapee from Auschwitz during World War II, cancer.
- Charlie Hodge, 71, American guitarist and backup singer for Elvis Presley and Graceland resident, lung cancer.
- Paul Smith, 77, American actor.
- Richard Vander Veen, 83, American politician, former Democratic United States Representative from Michigan (1973–1977), prostate cancer.

=== 4 ===
- Ivano Corghi, 83, Italian football goalkeeper and manager.
- John Reynolds Gardiner, 61, American children's author (Stone Fox), pancreatitis.
- Roman Ogaza, 54, Polish footballer and Olympian (1976).
- Edgar Valter, 76, Estonian children's book illustrator and cartoonist.

=== 5 ===
- Milan Babić, 50, Croatian politician, former leader of the Republic of Serbian Krajina who pleaded guilty to war crimes, suicide by hanging.
- Ken Beck, 70, American football player (Texas A&M Aggies, Green Bay Packers).
- Richard Kuklinski, 70, American mafia hitman, natural causes.
- John Joseph Paul, 89, American Roman Catholic prelate, Bishop of La Crosse (1983–1994).
- John Sandusky, 80, American football player (Cleveland Browns, Green Bay Packers) and coach (Miami Dolphins), complications from internal bleeding.
- Bill Wolski, 61, American football player (Atlanta Falcons), melanoma.

=== 6 ===
- Anne Braden, 81, American civil rights activist.
- Gunnar Halvorsen, 60, Norwegian politician.
- King Floyd, 61, American soul singer.
- Mubdar Hatim al-Dulaimi, 55, Iraqi general, Major General in the Iraqi Army, shot by a sniper.
- Claude Penz, 81, French Olympic alpine skier (1948).
- Mortimer Planno, 85, Cuban Rastafarian philosopher.
- Kirby Puckett, 45, American baseball player (Minnesota Twins) and member of the MLB Hall of Fame, stroke complications.
- Dana Reeve, 44, American actress and activist, lung cancer.
- Tito Tolin, 70, Italian Olympic ski jumper (1956).
- Simon Ungers, 49, German-born New York-based architect and artist.
- Ruth Weiss, 97, Austrian-Chinese journalist and member of the Chinese People's Political Consultative Conference.

=== 7 ===
- Howard Jackson, 54, American martial artist, leukemia.
- John Junkin, 76, British actor (A Hard Day's Night, EastEnders, On the House), lung cancer.
- Ludwik Margules, 72, Mexican theatre director, cancer.
- John J. McFall, 88, American politician, former Democratic United States Representative from California (1956–1978).
- Gordon Parks, 93, American film director (Shaft, The Learning Tree, The Super Cops), cancer.
- Ali Farka Touré, 66, Malian musician, cancer.

=== 8 ===
- Sir Brian Barratt-Boyes, 82, New Zealand pioneering heart surgeon, complications during heart valve replacement.
- Joseph H. Burchenal, 93, American oncologist.
- Teresa Ciepły, 69, Polish athlete and Olympian (1960, 1964).
- Giordano Cottur, 91, Italian Giro d'Italia champion.
- Ronald Faulds, 83, Australian Olympic diver (1952, 1956)
- George Sassoon, 69, British scientist, author and radio amateur, cancer.

=== 9 ===
- Hanka Bielicka, 90, Polish singer and actress.
- Dennis Brookes, 90, English cricketer.
- Erik Elmsäter, 86, Swedish athlete, first Swede to compete in both Summer and Winter Olympics (1948 Summer, 1948 Winter, 1952).
- Tom Fox, 54, American peacemaker taken hostage in Iraq
- Péter Halász, 62, Hungarian theatre director, actor, and writer, liver cancer.
- Doug Hamilton, 43, American general manager for the Los Angeles Galaxy soccer team, heart attack aboard aircraft.
- Steve Henderson, 61-62, American role-playing game designer.
- Colin Ingleby-Mackenzie, 72, English cricketer and insurance executive, brain tumour.
- Barney McFadden, 59, American actor.
- Anna Moffo, 73, American singer and operatic soprano, stroke following decade long battle with breast cancer.
- John Profumo, 91, British politician, complications following a stroke.
- Harry Seidler, 82, Austrian-born Australian architect, leading exponent of Modernism's methodology.
- Laura Stoica, 38, Romanian pop rock singer, traffic collision.
- Charles von Westenholz, 60, British Olympic alpine skier (1964).
- John Wilde, 86, American surrealist painter.

=== 10 ===
- Jim Hoffstetter, 68, Luxembourgian footballer.
- Rick Huckabay, 60, American basketball coach.
- Alberto Migré, 74, Argentine TV screenwriter and producer, heart attack.
- Ronald H. Nash, 69, American philosopher.
- Graciela Silvain, Argentine-born American soprano.
- Jan Wiktor Wiśniewski, 83, Polish football player and Olympian (1952).

=== 11 ===
- Sir Anthony Farrar-Hockley, 81, British soldier and military historian.
- Bernie Geoffrion, 75, Canadian professional ice hockey player and coach (Montreal Canadiens, New York Rangers), stomach cancer.
- Pauline Gregg, 96, British author, historian and biographer.
- István Gyulai, 62, Hungarian television commentator, sprinter, and Olympian (1964).
- Slobodan Milošević, 64, Yugoslav and Serbian politician, former president of the Federal Republic of Yugoslavia standing trial for war crimes, heart attack.
- Jesús Rollán, 37, Spanish former water polo goalkeeper and Olympian (1988, 1992, 1996, 2000, 2004), suicide by jumping.
- Lindsay Shonteff, 70, British horror film director of the 1960s.
- Charles M. Tanner, 85, American screenwriter, playwright and founder of Covenant Players, declining health following massive stroke.

=== 12 ===
- Nick Barone, 79, American heavyweight and light heavyweight boxer.
- Joseph Bova, 81, American actor (Once Upon a Mattress, Serpico, Up the Sandbox).
- Jurij Brězan, 89, Sorbian-German writer.
- Jim Flynn, 84, Irish Olympic basketball player (1948).
- István Gyulai, 62, Hungarian journalist, General Secretary of the International Association of Athletics Federations.
- Kurt Heubusch, 64, Austrian Olympic canoeist (1964, 1972).
- Jonatan Johansson, 26, Swedish snowboarder and Olympian (2006), accident during training.
- Adi Lev, 52, Israeli actress and voice actress, cancer.
- William Metzig, 87, American baseball player (Chicago White Sox).
- Victor Sokolov, 59, Russian-American former dissident Soviet journalist and Orthodox priest, lung cancer.

=== 13 ===
- Robert C. Baker, 84, American agricultural scientist, developed chicken products and processes.
- Roy Clarke, 80, Welsh footballer for Manchester City & Wales.
- Samuel Hugh Dillin, 91, American district judge (United States District Court for the Southern District of Indiana).
- Bato Govedarica, 77, Serb-American basketball player (Syracuse Nationals).
- Jimmy Johnstone, 61, Scottish football player, voted Celtic's best ever, motor neurone disease.
- Paul Pineau, 82, French cyclist.
- Maureen Stapleton, 80, American actress (Reds, Plaza Suite, Cocoon), Oscar winner (1982), chronic obstructive pulmonary disease.
- Peter Tomarken, 63, American game show host (Press Your Luck), plane crash.

=== 14 ===
- Ephraim Anderson, 94, British microbiologist.
- Ann Calvello, 76, American roller derby player, liver cancer.
- Nat Frankel, 92, American basketball player (Pittsburgh Ironmen).
- Hamish Gray, Baron Gray of Contin, 78, Scottish politician and life peer, former British Conservative government minister.
- Lennart Meri, 76, Estonian politician, writer, film director and statesman, former President of Estonia.
- Art Michaluk, 82, American Hockey League hockey player (Chicago Black Hawks), and World War II veteran.

=== 15 ===
- Ken Brewer, 64, American Poet Laureate of Utah, pancreatic cancer.
- Humphrey, c. 17, British Chief Mouser to the Cabinet Office, (1989–1997).
- Tom Kennedy, 67, American football player (New York Giants).
- George Mackey, 90, American mathematician, formerly Landon T. Clay Professor of mathematics, Harvard University.
- Charles Newman, 67, American novelist (White Jazz, The Promisekeeper: A Tephramancy) and editor (TriQuarterly).
- Georgios Rallis, 87, Greek conservative politician, former Prime Minister of Greece (1980–1981), heart failure.
- Mark R. V. Southern, 45, British professor of linguistics, Middlebury College.
- Red Storey, 88, former Canadian Football League player and NHL referee.
- Dick Wildung, 84, American football player (Minnesota Golden Gophers, Green Bay Packers).

=== 16 ===
- Gerda Daumerlang, 85, German diver and Olympian (1936).
- Jonathan Delisle, 28, American Hockey League and National Hockey League hockey player (Montreal Canadiens), automobile accident.
- Miguel Espinós, 59, Spanish cyclist and Olympian (1972).
- David Feintuch, 61, American science fiction author, following cardiac trouble.
- Paul Flaherty, 42, American computer scientist, web indexing pioneer, heart attack.
- Bill Hartman, 90, American football player (Georgia Bulldogs, Washington Redskins).
- James Hill, 95, British Army officer, commander of the 3rd Parachute Brigade 1943–1945.
- K. Leroy Irvis, 86, American politician, Speaker of Pennsylvania House of Representatives (first African-American Speaker in any U.S. state government), cancer.
- Tam Kong Pak, 94, Chinese footballer and Olympian (1936).
- Moira Redmond, 77, English actress, heart attack.
- Jade Snow Wong, 84, Chinese author and ceramicist, natural causes.

=== 17 ===
- Yuan Baojing, 40, Chinese multi-millionaire, executed by lethal injection for ordering a contract killing.
- Oleg Cassini, 92, American fashion designer.
- Narvin Kimball, 97, American banjo player, founding member of the Preservation Hall Jazz Band and the Gentlemen of Jazz.
- Ray Meyer, 92, American men's collegiate basketball coach, former DePaul basketball coach and member of the Basketball Hall of Fame, natural causes.
- G. William Miller, 81, United States Secretary of Treasury from 1979 - 1981 under Jimmy Carter, idiopathic pulmonary fibrosis.
- Gun Röring, 75, Swedish Olympic gymnast (1952).
- Axel Thieme, 66, German Olympic field hockey player (1964, 1968).

=== 18 ===
- Michael Attwell, 63, British actor (EastEnders, Buster, Labyrinth).
- Bill Beutel, 75, American television reporter, journalist and WABC-TV anchorman, Alzheimer's disease.
- Betty Jane Cornett, 73, American baseball player (AAGPBL).
- Nelson Dantas, 78, Brazilian actor, lung cancer.
- Anatoliy Puzach, 64, former Soviet World Cup footballer and title-winning coach of Dynamo Kiev.
- Sir Wally Rae, 92, Australian Queensland politician.

=== 19 ===
- Mohammad Ali, 78, Pakistani actor, cardiac arrest.
- Golap Borbora, 80, Indian politician, Chief Minister of Assam.
- Anselmo Colzani, 87, Italian operatic baritone.
- Nicholas R. Cozzarelli, 67, American molecular and cell biologist, science journal editor, Burkitt's lymphoma.
- Leon Daniel, 74, American correspondent and editor for United Press International.
- Robin Hodder, 68, Australian Olympic field hockey player (1964).
- Channing Pollock, 79, American magician, complications of cancer.
- Richard Root, 68, American epidemiologist, crocodile attack.
- John Wyatt, 81, British writer and ranger.

=== 20 ===
- Nicolas Birtz, 84, Luxembourgian footballer and Olympian (1948).
- Bernard Gosselin, 71, Canadian film director.
- Gene Scott, 68, American tennis player and publisher of Tennis Week.
- Chris Tame, 56, British political activist, bone cancer.
- Zdzisław Trojanowski, 77, Polish Olympic ice hockey player (1952).
- P. R. Wallace, 90, Canadian theoretical physicist.

=== 21 ===
- Desmond Ackner, Baron Ackner, 85, British jurist, Lord of Appeal.
- Bob Delegall, 60, American actor and director, prostate cancer.
- Gerry Ehman, 73, Canadian ice hockey player.
- Margaret Ewing, 60, Scottish nationalist politician, breast cancer.
- James O. Freedman, 70, American educator and academic administrator, former president of Dartmouth College and the University of Iowa, non-Hodgkin lymphoma.
- Bernard Lacoste, 74, French clothing magnate of Lacoste, unspecified illness.
- Leslie MacMitchell, 85, American runner, James E. Sullivan Award winner.
- Bob Sims, 67, American basketball player (Los Angeles Lakers, St. Louis Hawks, Anaheim Amigos).
- Richard Usborne, 95, British author and journalist.
- Stig Wennerström, 99, Swedish Air Force Colonel convicted of spying for the USSR.

=== 22 ===
- Ria Beckers, 67, Dutch politician, former political leader of the Dutch political parties Politieke Partij Radicalen and GroenLinks.
- Willi Brendel, 67, German Olympic field hockey player (1960).
- James Chikerema, 80, Zimbabwean nationalist, co-founder of ZAPU and government co-minister in the internal settlement government of Rhodesia.
- Pierre Clostermann, 85, French World War II flying ace.
- Gordon Flick, 84, American basketball player.
- Eugene Landy, 71, American psychologist, famous for treating Brian Wilson, lung cancer.
- Britt Lomond, 80, American actor (Zorro), fencer, and World War II veteran.
- Gergely András Molnár, 108, Hungarian World War I veteran, one of the last Hungarian World War I veterans.
- Margaret Murray, 78, American baseball player.
- Brian Parkyn, 82, British Labour MP for Bedford (1966–1970).
- Sir Henry Yellowlees, 86, British Chief Medical Officer (1973–1984).

=== 23 ===
- Adwaita, 255 (approximate age), tortoise claimant for world's oldest animal, reputedly a former pet of General Clive, liver failure.
- David B. Bleak, 74, American soldier, Medal of Honor recipient in the Korean War.
- Sarah Caldwell, 82, American opera conductor, impresario, and stage director, longtime conductor of the Opera Company of Boston.
- Jean Desclaux, 83, French rugby union player and coach (US Dax, national team).
- Desmond Doss, 87, United States Army corporal, Medal of Honor recipient and conscientious objector.
- Gerry "Tex" Ehman, 73, Canadian-born retired NHL player and executive, lung cancer.
- Harold P. Eubank, 81, American physicist.
- Eloy de la Iglesia, 62, Spanish film director.
- Antonina Ivanova, 73, Soviet Russian shot putter and Olympian (1972).
- Pío Leyva, 88, Cuban musician (Buena Vista Social Club), heart attack.
- Peter Shand Kydd, 80, English wallpaper heir and stepfather of Diana, Princess of Wales.
- Feodora Schenk, 85, Austrian Olympic high jumper (1952).
- Ingi Þorsteinsson, 76, Icelandic athlete and Olympian (1952).
- Cindy Walker, 87, American country-western songwriter, (Dream Baby) for Roy Orbison et al.

=== 24 ===
- Jörg Bastuck, 36, German rally car co-driver, accident during the 2006 Rally Catalunya.
- J. Glenn Beall Jr., 78, American politician, former Republican Senator from Maryland (1971–1977) and United States Representative (1969–1971).
- Jaroslava Moserová, 76, Czech senator, ambassador, presidential candidate, doctor, and translator.
- Ion Munteanu, 50, Romanian footballer.
- Lynne Perrie, 74, English actress (Coronation Street, Queenie's Castle, Kes), stroke.
- Jean Pommat, 61, French swimmer and Olympian (1960).
- Norman Pounds, 94, English geographer and historian
- Carl J. Seiberlich, 84, American naval aviator.

=== 25 ===
- Johan Bontekoe, 62, Dutch swimmer and Olympian (1964).
- Bob Carlos Clarke, 55, Irish photographer, suicide by train.
- Gary du Plessis, 31, Zimbabwean cricketer (Mashonaland, Mashonaland A).
- Rocío Dúrcal, 61, Spanish singer and actress, uterine cancer.
- Richard Fleischer, 89, American film director (Tora! Tora! Tora!, 20,000 Leagues Under the Sea, Soylent Green).
- Danilo Lazović, 56, Serbian actor, heart attack.
- Buck Owens, 76, American country music star (Hee Haw), heart attack.
- Nilmaris Santini, 46, Puerto Rican judoka and Olympian (1992).
- Alfredo Silipigni, 74, American longtime conductor of the New Jersey State Opera, complications of pneumonia.

=== 26 ===
- Angelo d'Arrigo, 44, Italian aviator, air crash.
- Anil Biswas, 61, Indian politician, cerebral hemorrhage.
- David Cunliffe-Lister, 2nd Earl of Swinton, 69, British peer, politician & magistrate.
- Paul Dana, 30, American Indy Racing League driver, multiple trauma injuries sustained in accident.
- Kristoffer Lepsøe, 84, Norwegian rower and Olympian (1948, 1952).
- Ole Madsen, 71, Danish footballer.
- Don Martineau, 53, Canadian ice hockey player (Atlanta Flames, Minnesota North Stars, Detroit Red Wings).
- Carlton Rose, 44, American football player (Michigan Wolverines, Washington Redskins).
- Nikki Sudden, 49, British musician, punk-blues icon, and co-founder of Swell Maps.

=== 27 ===
- Al Alquist, 97, American politician, former California state senator.
- Wayne Boden, 58, Canadian serial killer and rapist, of natural causes after a lengthy illness.
- Werner Camichel, 61, Swiss bobsledder and Olympian (1972).
- Dan Curtis, 77, American television producer (Dark Shadows, The Winds of War).
- Ian Hamilton Finlay, 80, Scottish artist.
- Ken Kaess, 51, American advertising executive, CEO of DDB Worldwide, cancer.
- Stanisław Lem, 84, Polish science fiction writer, heart failure.
- Ruari McLean, 88, British typographer.
- Lyn Nofziger, 81, American journalist, conservative Republican political consultant and press secretary for Ronald Reagan.
- Ron Schipper, 77, American football coach and college athletics administrator, College Football Hall of Fame Coach.
- Madeleine Scrève, 93, Belgian Olympic fencer (1936).
- Bernard Siegan, 81, American law professor.
- Rudolf Vrba, 82, Canadian pharmacologist, Auschwitz escapee and contributor to the Auschwitz Protocol, cancer.
- Peter Wells, 58, Australian guitarist from rock outfit Rose Tattoo, prostate cancer.
- Neil Williams, 43, English international Test cricketer.

=== 28 ===
- Wanderley Magalhães Azevedo, 39, Brazilian cyclist and Olympian (1988, 1992).
- Jerry Brudos, 67, American serial killer and necrophiliac, natural causes.
- Carlos Cat, 75, Uruguayan Minister of Labour (1990–1991) and of Transport (2000–2002).
- Leslie Fadgyas, 88, Australian Olympic fencer (1956).
- Pro Hart, 77, Australian outback painter, motor neurone disease.
- Bansi Lal, 78, Indian Haryana's four time chief minister, and defence minister of India during Indian Emergency (1975–77).
- Paul Minner, 82, American baseball player (Brooklyn Dodgers, Chicago Cubs).
- Bert Oldershaw, 84, Canadian canoeist and Olympian (1948, 1952, 1956).
- Charles Schepens, 94, American ophthalmologist known as "the father of retinal surgery" and a Nazi resistance movement leader.
- Caspar Weinberger, 88, U.S. Secretary of Defense 1981-1987 under Reagan, Secretary of Health, Education, and Welfare 1973-1975 under Nixon and Ford.

=== 29 ===
- Don Alias, 66, American jazz percussionist.
- Quirico Bernacchi, 91, Italian cyclist.
- Eric Budd, 84, English administrator, the General Secretary (1987–2000) and Vice-Chairman of The Cricket Society (2000–2001).
- Salvador Elizondo, 73, Mexican writer and member of the Academia Mexicana de la Lengua, of cancer.
- Henry Farrell, 85, American author and screenwriter (What Ever Happened to Baby Jane?, Hush… Hush, Sweet Charlotte).
- Penny Jay, 80, American country singer/songwriter ("Don't Let Me Cross Over").
- Thornton Kipper, 77, American baseball player (Philadelphia Phillies).
- Gretchen Rau, 66, American set decorator (Memoirs of a Geisha, The Last Samurai, Crocodile Dundee), Oscar winner (2006), brain tumor.
- Bob Veith, 81, American racecar driver, former Indianapolis 500 racing driver.

=== 30 ===
- Red Hickey, 89, American football player (Pittsburgh Steelers, Cleveland/Los Angeles Rams) and coach (San Francisco 49ers), inventor of shotgun formation, natural causes.
- Philip Hyde, 84, American wildlife photographer.
- Manohar Shyam Joshi, 73, Indian Hindi novelist and soap opera writer.
- Harry Krantz, 86, Australian trade union official.
- John McGahern, 71, Irish novelist and playwright, cancer.
- Gloria Monty, 84, American television producer, executive producer of the soap opera General Hospital, cancer.
- Pauli Tavisalo, 78, Finnish Olympic sprinter (1952).

=== 31 ===
- George L. Brown, 79, American politician, former Lieutenant Governor of Colorado, first black lieutenant governor in the US.
- Olive McKean, 90, American swimmer, swimming coach and Olympic medalist (1936).
- Jackie McLean, 74, American jazz saxophonist.
- Gerhard Potma, 38, Dutch sailor and Olympian (1992, 1996).
- Candice Rialson, 54, American actress, liver disease.
