= 2023 Croatia Rally =

47th edition of Croatia Rally

2023 Croatia Rally Croatia Rally 2023
Round 4 of 13 in the 2023 World Rally Championship
← Previous event	Next event →
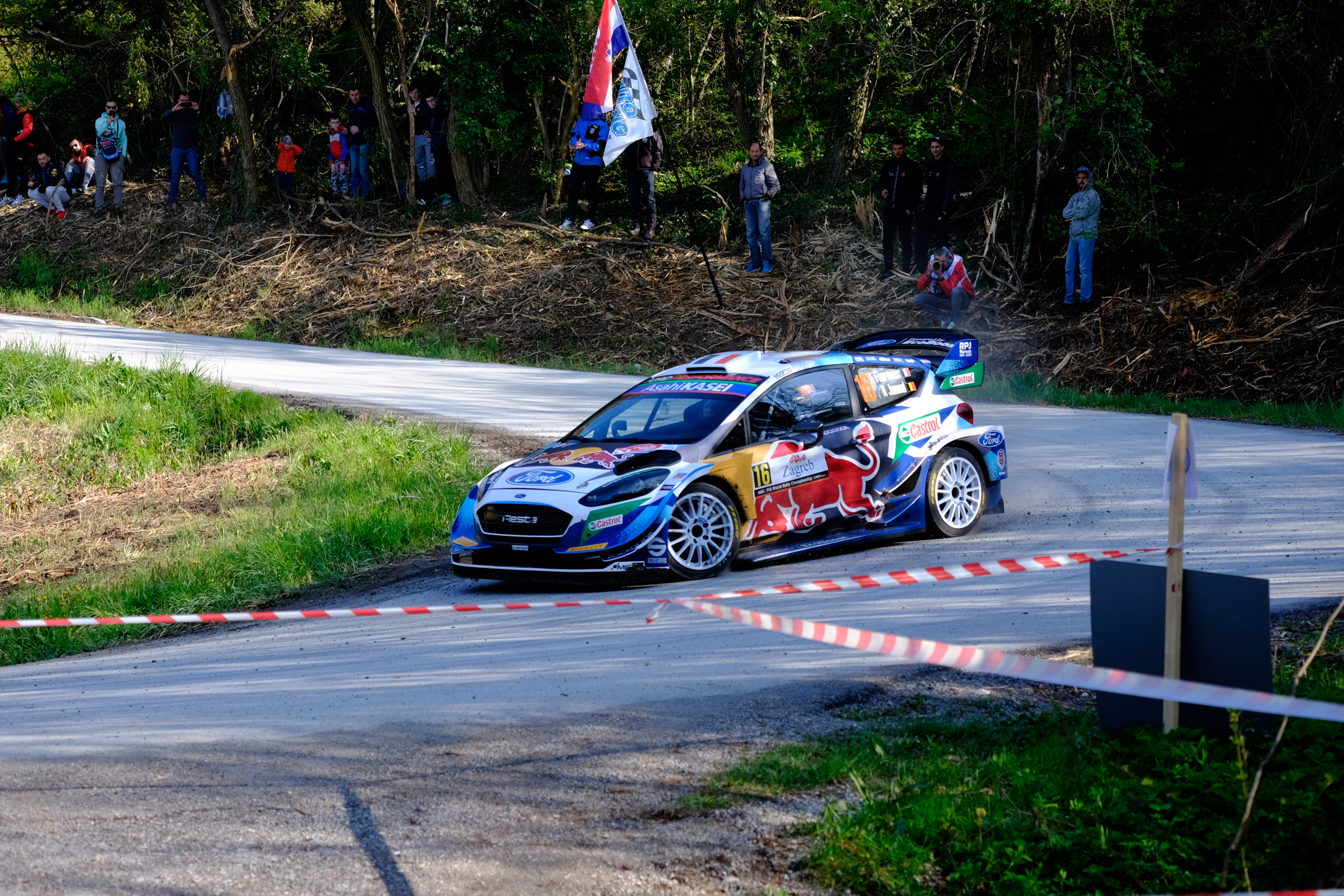
- The Croatia Rally was the first tarmac rally on the calendar.
- Host country: Croatia
- Rally base: Zagreb
- Dates run: 20 – 23 April 2023
- Start location: Samobor, Zagreb County
- Finish location: Kumrovec, Krapina-Zagorje
- Stages: 20 (301.26 km; 187.19 miles)
- Stage surface: Tarmac
- Transport distance: 1,348.42 km (837.87 miles)
- Overall distance: 1,649.68 km (1,025.06 miles)

Statistics
- Crews registered: 57
- Crews: 54 at start, 48 at finish

Overall results
- Overall winner: (United Kingdom) Elfyn Evans (United Kingdom) Scott Martin (Japan) Toyota Gazoo Racing; 2:50:54.3
- Power Stage winner: (Belgium) Thierry Neuville (Belgium) Martijn Wydaeghe (South Korea) Hyundai Shell Mobil WRT; 8:06.4

Support category results
- WRC-2 winner: (France) Yohan Rossel (France) Arnaud Dunand (France) PH Sport; 2:58:45.6
- WRC-3 winner: (Republic of Ireland) Eamonn Kelly (Republic of Ireland) Conor Mohan (Republic of Ireland) Motorsport Ireland Academy; 3:20:15.7
- J-WRC winner: (Republic of Ireland) Eamonn Kelly (Republic of Ireland) Conor Mohan (Republic of Ireland) Motorsport Ireland Academy; 3:20:15.7

The 2023 Croatia Rally (also known as the Rally Croatia 2023) was a motor racing event for rally cars that was held over four days between 20 and 23 April 2023. It marked the 47th running of the Croatia Rally, and was the fourth round of the 2023 World Rally Championship, World Rally Championship-2 and World Rally Championship-3. The event was also the second round of the 2023 Junior World Rally Championship. The 2023 event was based in Zagreb in Central Croatia and was contested over twenty special stages, covering a total competitive distance of 301.26 km (187.19 mi).

Kalle Rovanperä and Jonne Halttunen were the defending rally winners. Their team, Toyota Gazoo Racing WRT, were the defending manufacturer's winners. Yohan Rossel and Valentin Sarreaud were the defending rally winners in the WRC-2 category. Zoltán László and Tamás Kürti were the defending rally winners in the WRC-3 category. Lauri Joona and Mikael Korhonen were the defending rally winners in the junior category.

Elfyn Evans and Scott Martin won the rally, ending their victory drought since the 2021 Rally Finland. Their team, Toyota Gazoo Racing WRT successfully defended their manufacturer's title. Yohan Rossel and Arnaud Dunand successfully defended their titles in the World Rally Championship-2 category. Eamonn Kelly and Conor Mohan won the World Rally Championship-3 category, as well as the junior championship.

Following an accident in the pre-event test, Hyundai Shell Mobis WRT driver Craig Breen died at the age of 33.

== Background ==
=== Entry list ===
The following crews were set to enter into the rally. The event was open to crews competing in the World Rally Championship, its support categories, the World Rally Championship-2, World Rally Championship-3, Junior World Rally Championship and privateer entries that were not registered to score points in any championship. Nine were entered under Rally1 regulations, as were nineteen Rally2 crews in the World Rally Championship-2 and eight Rally3 crew in the World Rally Championship-3. A total of eight crews were registered to participate in the Junior World Rally Championship.

Rally1 entries competing in the World Rally Championship
No.	Driver	Co-Driver	Entrant	Car	Championship eligibility	Tyre
4	(Finland) Esapekka Lappi	(Finland) Janne Ferm	(South Korea) Hyundai Shell Mobis WRT	Hyundai i20 N Rally1	Driver, Co-driver, Manufacturer	P
7	(France) Pierre-Louis Loubet	(Belgium) Nicolas Gilsoul	(United Kingdom) M-Sport Ford WRT	Ford Puma Rally1	Driver, Co-driver, Manufacturer	P
8	(Estonia) Ott Tänak	(Estonia) Martin Järveoja	(United Kingdom) M-Sport Ford WRT	Ford Puma Rally1	Driver, Co-driver, Manufacturer	P
11	(Belgium) Thierry Neuville	(Belgium) Martijn Wydaeghe	(South Korea) Hyundai Shell Mobis WRT	Hyundai i20 N Rally1	Driver, Co-driver, Manufacturer	P
17	(France) Sébastien Ogier	(France) Vincent Landais	(Japan) Toyota Gazoo Racing WRT	Toyota GR Yaris Rally1	Driver, Co-driver, Manufacturer	P
18	(Japan) Takamoto Katsuta	(Republic of Ireland) Aaron Johnston	(Japan) Toyota Gazoo Racing WRT	Toyota GR Yaris Rally1	Driver, Co-driver	P
33	(United Kingdom) Elfyn Evans	(United Kingdom) Scott Martin	(Japan) Toyota Gazoo Racing WRT	Toyota GR Yaris Rally1	Driver, Co-driver, ~~Manufacturer~~ (Note: The Toyota crew of Elfyn Evans and Scott Martin was initially nominated to score manufacturer points at the weekend, but Toyota amended their championship eligibility to not score manufacturer points to match Hyundai and M-Sport following Breen's death ahead of the event as a mark of solidarity.)	P
42	(Republic of Ireland) Craig Breen	(Republic of Ireland) James Fulton	(South Korea) Hyundai Shell Mobis WRT	Hyundai i20 N Rally1	Driver, Co-driver, Manufacturer	—N/a
69	(Finland) Kalle Rovanperä	(Finland) Jonne Halttunen	(Japan) Toyota Gazoo Racing WRT	Toyota GR Yaris Rally1	Driver, Co-driver, Manufacturer	P

Rally2 entries competing in the World Rally Championship-2
No.	Driver	Co-Driver	Entrant	Car	Championship eligibility	Tyre
21	(France) Yohan Rossel	(France) Arnaud Dunand	(France) PH Sport	Citroën C3 Rally2	Driver, Co-driver	P
22	(Finland) Emil Lindholm	(Finland) Reeta Hämäläinen	(Germany) Toksport WRT	Škoda Fabia RS Rally2	Driver, Co-driver, Team	P
23	(United Kingdom) Gus Greensmith	(Sweden) Jonas Andersson	(Germany) Toksport WRT 2	Škoda Fabia RS Rally2	Driver, Co-driver	P
24	Nikolay Gryazin (Note: Nikolay Gryazin is Russian, but he competes as a neutral competitor using the ANA flag as Russian national emblems were banned by the association due to the Russian invasion of Ukraine.)	Konstantin Aleksandrov (Note: Konstantin Aleksandrov is Russian, but he competes as a neutral competitor using the ANA flag as Russian national emblems were banned by the association due to the Russian invasion of Ukraine.)	(Germany) Toksport WRT 2	Škoda Fabia RS Rally2	Challenger Driver, Challenger Co-driver	P
25	(France) Adrien Fourmaux	(France) Alexandre Coria	(United Kingdom) M-Sport Ford WRT	Ford Fiesta Rally2	Driver, Co-driver, Team	P
26	(Finland) Sami Pajari	(Finland) Enni Mälkönen	(Germany) Toksport WRT	Škoda Fabia RS Rally2	Challenger Driver, Challenger Co-driver, Team	P
27	(Czech Republic) Erik Cais	(Czech Republic) Petr Těšínský	(Czech Republic) Erik Cais	Škoda Fabia RS Rally2	Challenger Driver, Challenger Co-driver	P
28	(Luxembourg) Grégoire Munster	(Belgium) Louis Louka	(United Kingdom) M-Sport Ford WRT	Ford Fiesta Rally2	Challenger Driver, Challenger Co-driver, Team	P
29	(Estonia) Georg Linnamäe	(United Kingdom) James Morgan	(Estonia) Georg Linnamäe	Hyundai i20 N Rally2	Challenger Driver, Challenger Co-driver	P
30	(France) Nicolas Ciamin	(France) Yannick Roche	(France) Nicolas Ciamin	Volkswagen Polo GTI R5	Challenger Driver, Challenger Co-driver	P
31	(Republic of Ireland) Josh McErlean	(Republic of Ireland) John Rowan	(Republic of Ireland) Motorsport Ireland Rally Academy	Hyundai i20 N Rally2	Challenger Driver, Challenger Co-driver, Team	P
32	(Germany) Armin Kremer	(Germany) Ella Kremer	(Germany) Armin Kremer	Škoda Fabia RS Rally2	Challenger/Masters Driver, Challenger Co-driver	P
34	(Italy) Mauro Miele	(Italy) Luca Beltrame	(Italy) Mauro Miele	Škoda Fabia RS Rally2	Challenger/Masters Driver, Challenger Co-driver	P
35	(Austria) Johannes Keferböck	(Austria) Ilka Minor	(Austria) Johannes Keferböck	Škoda Fabia Rally2 evo	Challenger/Masters Driver, Co-driver	P
36	(Spain) Alejandro Cachón	(Spain) Alejandro López Fernández	(Spain) Alejandro Cachón	Citroën C3 Rally2	Challenger Driver, Challenger Co-driver	P
37	(Hungary) Norbert Herczig	(Hungary) Ramón Ferencz	(Hungary) Norbert Herczig	Škoda Fabia Rally2 evo	Challenger/Masters Driver, Co-driver	P
38	(Republic of Ireland) Patrick O'Brien	(Republic of Ireland) Stephen O'Brien	(Republic of Ireland) Motorsport Ireland Rally Academy	Hyundai i20 N Rally2	Challenger Driver, Challenger Co-driver, Team	P
39	(Netherlands) Henk Vossen	(Netherlands) Radboud van Hoek	(Netherlands) Henk Vossen	Škoda Fabia Rally2 evo	Challenger/Masters Driver, Challenger/Masters Co-driver	P
40	(Republic of Ireland) Eamonn Boland	(Republic of Ireland) Michael Joseph Morrissey	(Republic of Ireland) Eamonn Boland	Citroën C3 Rally2	Challenger/Masters Driver, Challenger/Masters Co-driver	P

Rally3 entries competing in the World Rally Championship-3 and/or the Junior World Rally Championship
No.	Driver	Co-Driver	Entrant	Car	Class eligibility	Tyre
41	(Republic of Ireland) William Creighton	(Republic of Ireland) Liam Regan	(Republic of Ireland) Motorsport Ireland Rally Academy	Ford Fiesta Rally3	WRC-3, Junior WRC	P
44	(France) Laurent Pellier	(France) Marine Pelamourgues	(France) Laurent Pellier	Ford Fiesta Rally3	WRC-3, Junior WRC	P
45	(Paraguay) Diego Dominguez Jr.	(Spain) Rogelio Peñate	(Paraguay) Diego Dominguez Jr.	Ford Fiesta Rally3	Junior WRC	P
46	(Spain) Raúl Hernández	(Spain) Rodrigo Sanjuan de Eusebio	(Spain) Raúl Hernández	Ford Fiesta Rally3	Junior WRC	P
47	(Spain) Roberto Blach Núñez	(Spain) Mauro Barreiro	(Spain) Roberto Blach Núñez	Ford Fiesta Rally3	WRC-3, Junior WRC	P
48	(Belgium) Tom Rensonnet	(Belgium) Loïc Dumont	(Belgium) Tom Rensonnet	Ford Fiesta Rally3	WRC-3, Junior WRC	P
49	(Kenya) Hamza Anwar	(Republic of Ireland) Martin Brady	(Kenya) Hamza Anwar	Ford Fiesta Rally3	WRC-3, Junior WRC	P
50	(Republic of Ireland) Eamonn Kelly	(Republic of Ireland) Conor Mohan	(Republic of Ireland) Motorsport Ireland Rally Academy	Ford Fiesta Rally3	WRC-3, Junior WRC	P
51	(Czech Republic) Filip Kohn	(Czech Republic) Tomáš Střeska	(Czech Republic) Filip Kohn	Ford Fiesta Rally3	WRC-3	P
52	(Croatia) Martin Ravenščak	(Croatia) Dora Ravenščak	(Croatia) Martin Ravenščak	Ford Fiesta Rally3	WRC-3	P

Other major entries
No.	Driver	Co-Driver	Entrant	Car	Championship eligibility	Tyre
20	(Sweden) Oliver Solberg	(United Kingdom) Elliott Edmondson	(Sweden) Oliver Solberg	Škoda Fabia RS Rally2	—N/a	P
56	(Hungary) Zoltán László	(Hungary) Gábor Zsiros	(Hungary) Zoltán László	Škoda Fabia Rally2 evo	Masters Driver	P
57	(Slovenia) Aleš Zrinski	(Slovenia) Rok Vidmar	(Slovenia) Aleš Zrinski	Škoda Fabia Rally2 evo	Masters Driver	P

=== Itinerary ===
All dates and times are CEST (UTC+2).

Date	No.	Time span	Stage name	Distance
20 April	—	After 9:00	Okić [Shakedown]	3.65 km
20 April		After 18:30	Opening ceremony, Zagreb	—N/a
21 April	SS1	After 8:03	Mali Lipovec – Grdanjci 1	19.20 km
21 April	SS2	After 8:56	Stojdraga – Hartje 1	25.67 km
21 April	SS3	After 9:59	Krašić – Vrškovac 1	11.11 km
21 April	SS4	After 11:12	Pećurkovo Brdo – Mrežnički Novaki 1	9.11 km
21 April		13:02 – 13:42	Service A, Zagreb	—N/a
21 April	SS5	After 14:45	Mali Lipovec – Grdanjci 2	19.20 km
21 April	SS6	After 15:38	Stojdraga – Hartje 2	25.67 km
21 April	SS7	After 16:41	Krašić – Vrškovac 2	11.11 km
21 April	SS8	After 17:54	Pećurkovo Brdo – Mrežnički Novaki 2	9.11 km
21 April		19:24 – 20:09	Flexi service B, Zagreb	—N/a
22 April		6:31 – 6:46	Service C, Zagreb	—N/a
22 April	SS9	After 7:54	Kostanjevac – Petruš Vrh 1	23.76 km
22 April	SS10	After 9:05	Vinski Vrh – Duga Resa 1	8.78 km
22 April	SS11	After 10:23	Ravna Gora – Skrad 1	10.13 km
22 April	SS12	After 11:26	Platak 1	15.63 km
22 April		14:06 – 14:46	Service D, Zagreb	—N/a
22 April	SS13	After 15:54	Kostanjevac – Petruš Vrh 2	23.76 km
22 April	SS14	After 17:05	Vinski Vrh – Duga Resa 2	8.78 km
22 April	SS15	After 18:23	Ravna Gora – Skrad 2	10.13 km
22 April	SS16	After 19:26	Platak 2	15.63 km
22 April		21:46 – 22:31	Flexi service E, Zagreb	—N/a
23 April		5:30 – 5:45	Service F, Zagreb	—N/a
23 April	SS17	After 7:08	Trakošćan – Vrbno 1	13.15 km
23 April	SS18	After 8:38	Zagorska Sela – Kumrovec 1	14.09 km
23 April	SS19	After 10:26	Trakošćan – Vrbno 2	13.15 km
23 April		12:01 – 12:58	Regroup, Kumrovec	—N/a
23 April	SS20	After 13:15	Zagorska Sela – Kumrovec 2 [Power Stage]	14.09 km
23 April		After 15:30	Podium ceremony, Kumrovec	—N/a

== Report ==
=== WRC Rally1 ===
==== Classification ====
Position		No.	Driver	Co-driver	Entrant	Car	Time	Difference	Points	
Event	Class	No.	Driver	Co-driver	Entrant	Car	Time	Difference	Event	Stage
1	1	33	Elfyn Evans	Scott Martin	Toyota Gazoo Racing WRT	Toyota GR Yaris Rally1	2:50:54.3	0.0	25	0
2	2	8	Ott Tänak	Martin Järveoja	M-Sport Ford WRT	Ford Puma Rally1	2:51:21.3	+27.0	18	0
3	3	4	Esapekka Lappi	Janne Ferm	Hyundai Shell Mobis WRT	Hyundai i20 N Rally1	2:51:52.9	+58.6	15	1
4	4	69	Kalle Rovanperä	Jonne Halttunen	Toyota Gazoo Racing WRT	Toyota GR Yaris Rally1	2:52:12.6	+1:18.3	12	4
5	5	17	Sébastien Ogier	Vincent Landais	Toyota Gazoo Racing WRT	Toyota GR Yaris Rally1	2:52:22.3	+1:28.0	10	3
6	6	18	Takamoto Katsuta	Aaron Johnston	Toyota Gazoo Racing WRT	Toyota GR Yaris Rally1	2:53:16.8	+2:22.5	8	2
7	7	7	Pierre-Louis Loubet	Nicolas Gilsoul	M-Sport Ford WRT	Ford Puma Rally1	2:55:16.9	+4:22.6	6	0
33	8	11	Thierry Neuville	Martijn Wydaeghe	Hyundai Shell Mobis WRT	Hyundai i20 N Rally1	3:49:54.2	+58:59.9	0	5
Did not start		42	Craig Breen	James Fulton	Hyundai Shell Mobis WRT	Hyundai i20 N Rally1	Driver's fatal accident		0	0

==== Special stages ====
Stage	Winners	Car	Time	Class leaders
SD	Rovanperä / Halttunen	Toyota GR Yaris Rally1	1:52.8	—N/a
SS1	Ogier / Landais	Toyota GR Yaris Rally1	11:57.7	Ogier / Landais
SS2	Neuville / Wydaeghe	Hyundai i20 N Rally1	15:18.1	Neuville / Wydaeghe
SS3	Ogier / Landais	Toyota GR Yaris Rally1	5:30.8	Neuville / Wydaeghe
SS4	Ogier / Landais	Toyota GR Yaris Rally1	4:48.2	Neuville / Wydaeghe
SS5	Ogier / Landais	Toyota GR Yaris Rally1	12:06.8	Neuville / Wydaeghe
SS6	Lappi / Ferm	Hyundai i20 N Rally1	15:33.3	Neuville / Wydaeghe
SS7	Tänak / Järveoja	Ford Puma Rally1	5:29.1	Neuville / Wydaeghe
SS8	Evans / Martin	Toyota GR Yaris Rally1	4:56.3	Neuville / Wydaeghe
SS9	Rovanperä / Halttunen	Toyota GR Yaris Rally1	12:43.6	Neuville / Wydaeghe
SS10	Rovanperä / Halttunen	Toyota GR Yaris Rally1	4:30.3	Neuville / Wydaeghe
SS11	Rovanperä / Halttunen	Toyota GR Yaris Rally1	5:47.9	Evans / Martin
SS12	Ogier / Landais	Toyota GR Yaris Rally1	8:22.9	Evans / Martin
SS13	Ogier / Landais	Toyota GR Yaris Rally1	12:55.0	Evans / Martin
SS14	Tänak / Järveoja	Ford Puma Rally1	4:32.2	Evans / Martin
SS15	Rovanperä / Halttunen	Toyota GR Yaris Rally1	5:50.6	Evans / Martin
SS16	Ogier / Landais	Toyota GR Yaris Rally1	8:28.0	Evans / Martin
SS17	Rovanperä / Halttunen	Toyota GR Yaris Rally1	6:56.5	Evans / Martin
SS18	Neuville / Wydaeghe	Hyundai i20 N Rally1	8:08.2	Evans / Martin
SS19	Rovanperä / Halttunen	Toyota GR Yaris Rally1	7:02.5	Evans / Martin
SS20	Neuville / Wydaeghe	Hyundai i20 N Rally1	8:06.4	Evans / Martin

==== Championship standings ====
Pos.	Drivers' championships			Co-drivers' championships			Manufacturers' championships		
Pos.	Move	Driver	Points	Move	Co-driver	Points	Move	Manufacturer	Points
1		Sébastien Ogier	69		Vincent Landais	69		Toyota Gazoo Racing WRT	161
2	3	Elfyn Evans	69	3	Scott Martin	69		Hyundai Shell Mobis WRT	132
3		Kalle Rovanperä	68		Jonne Halttunen	68		M-Sport Ford WRT	108
4		Ott Tänak	65		Martin Järveoja	65			
5	3	Thierry Neuville	58	3	Martijn Wydaeghe	58			

=== WRC-2 Rally2 ===
==== Classification ====
Position		No.	Driver	Co-driver	Entrant	Car	Time	Difference	Points		
Event	Class	No.	Driver	Co-driver	Entrant	Car	Time	Difference	Class	Stage	Event
8	1	21	Yohan Rossel	Arnaud Dunand	PH Sport	Citroën C3 Rally2	2:58:45.6	0.0	25	0	4
9	2	24	Nikolay Gryazin	Konstantin Aleksandrov	Toksport WRT 2	Škoda Fabia RS Rally2	2:59:01.7	+16.1	18	0	2
11	3	22	Emil Lindholm	Reeta Hämäläinen	Toksport WRT	Škoda Fabia RS Rally2	3:00:13.1	+1:27.5	15	1	0
12	4	25	Adrien Fourmaux	Alexandre Coria	M-Sport Ford WRT	Ford Fiesta Rally2	3:01:04.1	+2:18.5	12	2	0
13	5	26	Sami Pajari	Enni Mälkönen	Toksport WRT	Škoda Fabia RS Rally2	3:01:12.2	+2:26.6	10	0	0
14	6	23	Gus Greensmith	Jonas Andersson	Toksport WRT2	Škoda Fabia RS Rally2	3:03:58.0	+5:12.4	8	3	0
15	7	32	Armin Kremer	Ella Kremer	Armin Kremer	Škoda Fabia RS Rally2	3:10:09.8	+11:24.2	6	0	0
16	8	37	Norbert Herczig	Ramón Ferencz	Norbert Herczig	Škoda Fabia Rally2 evo	3:12:05.1	+13:19.5	4	0	0
18	9	35	Johannes Keferböck	Ilka Minor	Johannes Keferböck	Škoda Fabia Rally2 evo	3:15:41.5	+16:55.9	2	0	0
19	10	38	Patrick O'Brien	Stephen O'Brien	Motorsport Ireland Rally Academy	Hyundai i20 N Rally2	3:16:01.4	+17:15.8	1	0	0
26	11	28	Grégoire Munster	Louis Louka	M-Sport Ford WRT	Ford Fiesta Rally2	3:34:23.3	+35:37.7	0	0	0
28	12	40	Eamonn Boland	Michael Joseph Morrissey	Eamonn Boland	Citroën C3 Rally2	3:36:37.1	+37:51.5	0	0	0
32	13	29	Georg Linnamäe	James Morgan	Georg Linnamäe	Hyundai i20 N Rally2	3:43:00.7	+44:15.1	0	0	0
36	14	39	Henk Vossen	Radboud van Hoek	Henk Vossen	Škoda Fabia Rally2 evo	3:57:49.0	+59:03.4	0	0	0
43	15	36	Alejandro Cachón	Alejandro López Fernández	Alejandro Cachón	Citroën C3 Rally2	4:20:01.1	+1:21:15.5	0	0	0
44	16	27	Erik Cais	Petr Těšínský	Erik Cais	Škoda Fabia RS Rally2	4:20:29.2	+1:21:43.6	0	0	0
Retired SS19		34	Mauro Miele	Luca Beltrame	Mauro Miele	Škoda Fabia RS Rally2	Overtime		0	0	0
Retired SS13		30	Nicolas Ciamin	Yannick Roche	Nicolas Ciamin	Volkswagen Polo GTI R5	Accident		0	0	0
Did not start		31	Josh McErlean	John Rowan	Motorsport Ireland Rally Academy	Hyundai i20 N Rally2	Withdrawn		0	0	0

==== Special stages ====
Overall
Stage	Winners	Car	Time	Class leaders
SD	Cais / Těšínský	Škoda Fabia RS Rally2	1:59.7	—N/a
SS1	Rossel / Dunand	Citroën C3 Rally2	12:39.2	Rossel / Dunand
SS2	Rossel / Dunand	Citroën C3 Rally2	15:53.5	Rossel / Dunand
SS3	Gryazin / Aleksandrov	Škoda Fabia RS Rally2	5:47.2	Rossel / Dunand
SS4	Lindholm / Hämäläinen	Škoda Fabia RS Rally2	5:01.0	Rossel / Dunand
SS5	Greensmith / Andersson	Škoda Fabia RS Rally2	12:36.6	Rossel / Dunand
SS6	Rossel / Dunand	Citroën C3 Rally2	16:11.4	Rossel / Dunand
SS7	Ciamin / Roche	Volkswagen Polo GTI R5	5:44.1	Rossel / Dunand
SS8	Gryazin / Aleksandrov	Škoda Fabia RS Rally2	5:07.2	Rossel / Dunand
SS9	Fourmaux / Coria	Ford Fiesta Rally2	13:28.7	Rossel / Dunand
SS10	Gryazin / Aleksandrov	Škoda Fabia RS Rally2	4:46.5	Rossel / Dunand
SS11	Ciamin / Roche	Volkswagen Polo GTI R5	6:13.7	Rossel / Dunand
SS12	Ciamin / Roche	Volkswagen Polo GTI R5	8:48.6	Rossel / Dunand
SS13	Gryazin / Aleksandrov	Škoda Fabia RS Rally2	13:30.6	Rossel / Dunand
SS14	Greensmith / Andersson; Pajari / Mälkönen	Škoda Fabia RS Rally2; Škoda Fabia RS Rally2	4:47.7	Rossel / Dunand
SS15	Gryazin / Aleksandrov	Škoda Fabia RS Rally2	6:15.4	Rossel / Dunand
SS16	Gryazin / Aleksandrov	Škoda Fabia RS Rally2	9:00.3	Rossel / Dunand
SS17	Rossel / Dunand	Citroën C3 Rally2	7:26.6	Rossel / Dunand
SS18	Greensmith / Andersson	Škoda Fabia RS Rally2	8:31.6	Rossel / Dunand
SS19	Rossel / Dunand	Citroën C3 Rally2	7:26.3	Rossel / Dunand
SS20	Greensmith / Andersson	Škoda Fabia RS Rally2	8:24.0	Rossel / Dunand

Challenger
Stage	Winners	Car	Time	Class leaders
SD	Cais / Těšínský	Škoda Fabia RS Rally2	1:59.7	—N/a
SS1	Gryazin / Aleksandrov	Škoda Fabia RS Rally2	12:56.9	Gryazin / Aleksandrov
SS2	Ciamin / Roche	Volkswagen Polo GTI R5	15:56.2	Ciamin / Roche
SS3	Gryazin / Aleksandrov	Škoda Fabia RS Rally2	5:47.2	Ciamin / Roche
SS4	Gryazin / Aleksandrov	Škoda Fabia RS Rally2	5:02.1	Gryazin / Aleksandrov
SS5	Gryazin / Aleksandrov	Škoda Fabia RS Rally2	12:38.4	Gryazin / Aleksandrov
SS6	Cachón / López Fernández	Citroën C3 Rally2	16:15.2	Gryazin / Aleksandrov
SS7	Ciamin / Roche	Volkswagen Polo GTI R5	5:44.1	Gryazin / Aleksandrov
SS8	Gryazin / Aleksandrov	Škoda Fabia RS Rally2	5:07.2	Gryazin / Aleksandrov
SS9	Ciamin / Roche	Volkswagen Polo GTI R5	13:32.1	Ciamin / Roche
SS10	Gryazin / Aleksandrov	Škoda Fabia RS Rally2	4:46.5	Gryazin / Aleksandrov
SS11	Ciamin / Roche	Volkswagen Polo GTI R5	6:13.7	Gryazin / Aleksandrov
SS12	Ciamin / Roche	Volkswagen Polo GTI R5	8:48.6	Ciamin / Roche
SS13	Gryazin / Aleksandrov	Škoda Fabia RS Rally2	13:30.6	Gryazin / Aleksandrov
SS14	Pajari / Mälkönen	Škoda Fabia RS Rally2	4:47.7	Gryazin / Aleksandrov
SS15	Gryazin / Aleksandrov	Škoda Fabia RS Rally2	6:15.4	Gryazin / Aleksandrov
SS16	Gryazin / Aleksandrov	Škoda Fabia RS Rally2	9:00.3	Gryazin / Aleksandrov
SS17	Pajari / Mälkönen	Škoda Fabia RS Rally2	7:28.7	Gryazin / Aleksandrov
SS18	Pajari / Mälkönen	Škoda Fabia RS Rally2	8:36.5	Gryazin / Aleksandrov
SS19	Gryazin / Aleksandrov	Škoda Fabia RS Rally2	7:26.7	Gryazin / Aleksandrov
SS20	Pajari / Mälkönen	Škoda Fabia RS Rally2	8:31.6	Gryazin / Aleksandrov

==== Championship standings ====
Pos.	Open Drivers' championships			Open Co-drivers' championships			Teams' championships			Challenger Drivers' championships			Challenger Co-drivers' championships		
Pos.	Move	Driver	Points	Move	Co-driver	Points	Move	Manufacturer	Points	Move	Manufacturer	Points	Move	Driver	Points
1	1	Yohan Rossel	53	1	Arnaud Dunand	53	1	Toksport WRT	80		Nikolay Gryazin	50		Konstantin Aleksandrov	50
2	1	Emil Lindholm	44	1	Reeta Hämäläinen	44	1	Toksport WRT 2	65	1	Sami Pajari	43	1	Enni Mälkönen	43
3	2	Oliver Solberg	43	2	Elliott Edmondson	43		M-Sport Ford WRT	60	1	Kajetan Kajetanowicz	25	1	Maciej Szczepaniak	25
4	1	Nikolay Gryazin	38	1	Konstantin Aleksandrov	38		Hyundai Motorsport N	30		Marco Bulacia	25	1	James Morgan	20
5	1	Gus Greensmith	37	1	Jonas Andersson	37		Motorsport Ireland Rally Academy	18	1	Georg Linnamäe	18	1	Borja Rozada	18

=== WRC-3 Rally3 ===
==== Classification ====
Position		No.	Driver	Co-driver	Entrant	Car	Time	Difference	Points
Event	Class	No.	Driver	Co-driver	Entrant	Car	Time	Difference	Points
20	1	50	Eamonn Kelly	Conor Mohan	Motorsport Ireland Rally Academy	Ford Fiesta Rally3	3:20:15.7	0.0	25
21	2	48	Tom Rensonnet	Loïc Dumont	Tom Rensonnet	Ford Fiesta Rally3	3:20:46.5	+30.8	18
35	3	47	Roberto Blach Núñez	Mauro Barreiro	Roberto Blach Núñez	Ford Fiesta Rally3	3:57:11.9	+36:56.2	15
41	4	49	Hamza Anwar	Martin Brady	Hamza Anwar	Ford Fiesta Rally3	4:16:10.8	+55:55.1	12
45	5	41	William Creighton	Liam Regan	Motorsport Ireland Rally Academy	Ford Fiesta Rally3	4:32:17.4	+1:12:01.7	10
46	6	51	Filip Kohn	Tomáš Střeska	Filip Kohn	Ford Fiesta Rally3	4:44:33.1	+1:24:17.4	8
Retired SS19		44	Laurent Pellier	Marine Pelamourgues	Laurent Pellier	Ford Fiesta Rally3	Engine		0
Retired SS18		52	Martin Ravenščak	Dora Ravenščak	Martin Ravenščak	Ford Fiesta Rally3	Accident		0

==== Special stages ====
Stage	Winners	Car	Time	Class leaders
SD	Creighton / Regan	Ford Fiesta Rally3	2:10.0	—N/a
SS1	Pellier / Pelamourgues	Ford Fiesta Rally3	13:32.4	Pellier / Pelamourgues
SS2	Creighton / Regan	Ford Fiesta Rally3	16:56.4	Pellier / Pelamourgues
SS3	Creighton / Regan	Ford Fiesta Rally3	36:42.6	Pellier / Pelamourgues
SS4	Pellier / Pelamourgues	Ford Fiesta Rally3	5:18.5	Pellier / Pelamourgues
SS5	Creighton / Regan	Ford Fiesta Rally3	13:14.2	Creighton / Regan
SS6	Creighton / Regan	Ford Fiesta Rally3	17:06.4	Creighton / Regan
SS7	Creighton / Regan	Ford Fiesta Rally3	6:07.7	Creighton / Regan
SS8	Creighton / Regan	Ford Fiesta Rally3	5:21.4	Creighton / Regan
SS9	Pellier / Pelamourgues	Ford Fiesta Rally3	14:34.4	Pellier / Pelamourgues
SS10	Rensonnet / Dumont	Ford Fiesta Rally3	5:10.9	Pellier / Pelamourgues
SS11	Pellier / Pelamourgues	Ford Fiesta Rally3	6:44.7	Pellier / Pelamourgues
SS12	Pellier / Pelamourgues	Ford Fiesta Rally3	9:46.2	Pellier / Pelamourgues
SS13	Núñez / Barreiro	Ford Fiesta Rally3	15:02.9	Pellier / Pelamourgues
SS14	Kohn / Střeska	Ford Fiesta Rally3	5:09.7	Pellier / Pelamourgues
SS15	Kohn / Střeska	Ford Fiesta Rally3	7:01.5	Pellier / Pelamourgues
SS16	Núñez / Barreiro	Ford Fiesta Rally3	10:17.8	Pellier / Pelamourgues
SS17	Creighton / Regan	Ford Fiesta Rally3	8:04.3	Pellier / Pelamourgues
SS18	Creighton / Regan	Ford Fiesta Rally3	9:10.1	Pellier / Pelamourgues
SS19	Creighton / Regan	Ford Fiesta Rally3	7:57.8	Kelly / Mohan
SS20	Creighton / Regan	Ford Fiesta Rally3	9:07.4	Kelly / Mohan

==== Championship standings ====
Pos.	Drivers' championships			Co-drivers' championships		
Pos.	Move	Driver	Points	Move	Co-driver	Points
1		Diego Dominguez Jr.	37		Rogelio Peñate	37
2	1	William Creighton	28	1	Liam Regan	28
3	3	Tom Rensonnet	28	3	Loïc Dumont	28
4	2	Roope Korhonen	25	2	Anssi Viinikka	25
5	7	Eamonn Kelly	25	7	Conor Mohan	25

=== J-WRC Rally3 ===
==== Classification ====
Position		No.	Driver	Co-driver	Entrant	Car	Time	Difference	Points	
Event	Class	No.	Driver	Co-driver	Entrant	Car	Time	Difference	Class	Stage
20	1	50	Eamonn Kelly	Conor Mohan	Motorsport Ireland Rally Academy	Ford Fiesta Rally3	3:20:15.7	0.0	25	0
21	2	48	Tom Rensonnet	Loïc Dumont	Tom Rensonnet	Ford Fiesta Rally3	3:20:46.5	+30.8	18	2
35	3	47	Roberto Blach Núñez	Mauro Barreiro	Roberto Blach Núñez	Ford Fiesta Rally3	3:57:11.9	+36:56.2	15	3
38	4	45	Diego Dominguez Jr.	Rogelio Peñate	Diego Dominguez Jr.	Ford Fiesta Rally3	3:58:14.7	+37:59.0	12	0
41	5	49	Hamza Anwar	Martin Brady	Hamza Anwar	Ford Fiesta Rally3	4:16:10.8	+55:55.1	10	0
42	6	46	Raúl Hernández	Rodrigo Sanjuan de Eusebio	Raúl Hernández	Ford Fiesta Rally3	4:19:17.5	+59:01.8	8	0
45	7	41	William Creighton	Liam Regan	Motorsport Ireland Rally Academy	Ford Fiesta Rally3	4:32:17.4	+1:12:01.7	6	10
Retired SS19		44	Laurent Pellier	Marine Pelamourgues	Laurent Pellier	Ford Fiesta Rally3	Engine		0	5

==== Special stages ====
Stage	Winners	Car	Time	Class leaders
SD	Creighton / Regan	Ford Fiesta Rally3	2:10.0	—N/a
SS1	Pellier / Pelamourgues	Ford Fiesta Rally3	13:32.4	Pellier / Pelamourgues
SS2	Creighton / Regan	Ford Fiesta Rally3	16:56.4	Pellier / Pelamourgues
SS3	Creighton / Regan	Ford Fiesta Rally3	6:12.5	Pellier / Pelamourgues
SS4	Pellier / Pelamourgues	Ford Fiesta Rally3	5:18.5	Pellier / Pelamourgues
SS5	Creighton / Regan	Ford Fiesta Rally3	13:14.2	Creighton / Regan
SS6	Creighton / Regan	Ford Fiesta Rally3	17:06.4	Creighton / Regan
SS7	Creighton / Regan	Ford Fiesta Rally3	6:07.7	Creighton / Regan
SS8	Creighton / Regan	Ford Fiesta Rally3	5:21.4	Creighton / Regan
SS9	Pellier / Pelamourgues	Ford Fiesta Rally3	14:34.4	Pellier / Pelamourgues
SS10	Rensonnet / Dumont	Ford Fiesta Rally3	5:10.9	Pellier / Pelamourgues
SS11	Pellier / Pelamourgues	Ford Fiesta Rally3	6:44.7	Pellier / Pelamourgues
SS12	Pellier / Pelamourgues	Ford Fiesta Rally3	9:46.2	Pellier / Pelamourgues
SS13	Núñez / Barreiro	Ford Fiesta Rally3	15:02.9	Pellier / Pelamourgues
SS14	Rensonnet / Dumont	Ford Fiesta Rally3	5:11.0	Pellier / Pelamourgues
SS15	Núñez / Barreiro	Ford Fiesta Rally3	7:04.2	Pellier / Pelamourgues
SS16	Núñez / Barreiro	Ford Fiesta Rally3	10:17.8	Pellier / Pelamourgues
SS17	Creighton / Regan	Ford Fiesta Rally3	8:04.3	Pellier / Pelamourgues
SS18	Creighton / Regan	Ford Fiesta Rally3	9:10.1	Pellier / Pelamourgues
SS19	Creighton / Regan	Ford Fiesta Rally3	7:57.8	Kelly / Mohan
SS20	Creighton / Regan	Ford Fiesta Rally3	9:07.4	Kelly / Mohan

==== Championship standings ====
Pos.	Drivers' championships			Co-drivers' championships		
Pos.	Move	Driver	Points	Move	Co-driver	Points
1		William Creighton	50		Liam Regan	50
2		Laurent Pellier	29		Marine Pelamourgues	29
3		Diego Dominguez Jr.	27		Rogelio Peñate	27
4	3	Tom Rensonnet	26	3	Loïc Dumont	26
5	1	Roberto Blach	26	1	Mauro Barreiro	26

== Death of Craig Breen ==
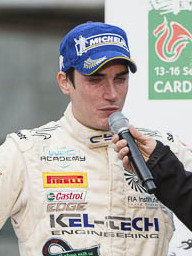
Craig Breen died in the pre-event test.

The event was overshadowed by the death of Hyundai works driver Craig Breen, who was killed in the pre-event test after the front-left of his Hyundai i20 N Rally1 collided with a pole on a road. This was the first competitor-involved fatal accident since Jörg Bastuck at the 2006 Rally Catalunya. His co-driver James Fulton was uninjured. Breen's funeral took place on 18 April 2023 at The Sacred Heart Church in Ferrybank. Several members from the WRC family attended the funeral, including Fulton, Breen's former co-driver, Paul Nagle and Breen's teammate at Hyundai, Dani Sordo.

In tribute to Breen, Moonraker Forestry Rally, the second round of the Irish Forestry Championship, was postponed. The Fédération Internationale de l'Automobile announced his car number 42 would be retired from the rest of the season. Hyundai also decided to participate the event with a special livery on two cars, with the third car withdrawn from the event in honor of Breen.

== Notes ==
Previous rally: 2023 Rally Mexico	2023 FIA World Rally Championship	Next rally: 2023 Rally de Portugal
Previous rally: 2022 Croatia Rally	2023 Croatia Rally	Next rally: 2024 Croatia Rally
