= Bastuck =

Bastuck is a German surname. Notable people with the surname include:

- Jörg Bastuck (1969–2006), German rally co-driver
- Rainer Bastuck (born 1960), German racing driver
