= Corghi =

Corghi is a surname of Italian origin. Notable people with the surname include:

- Azio Corghi (1937–2022), Italian composer, educator, and musicologist
- Benito Corghi (1938–1976), Italian long-distance truckdriver, murdered by East German Border Guards while crossing the inner German border
- Ivano Corghi (1922–2006), Italian footballer and manager
