= Peugeot 307 =

Small family car by Peugeot, 2001–2014

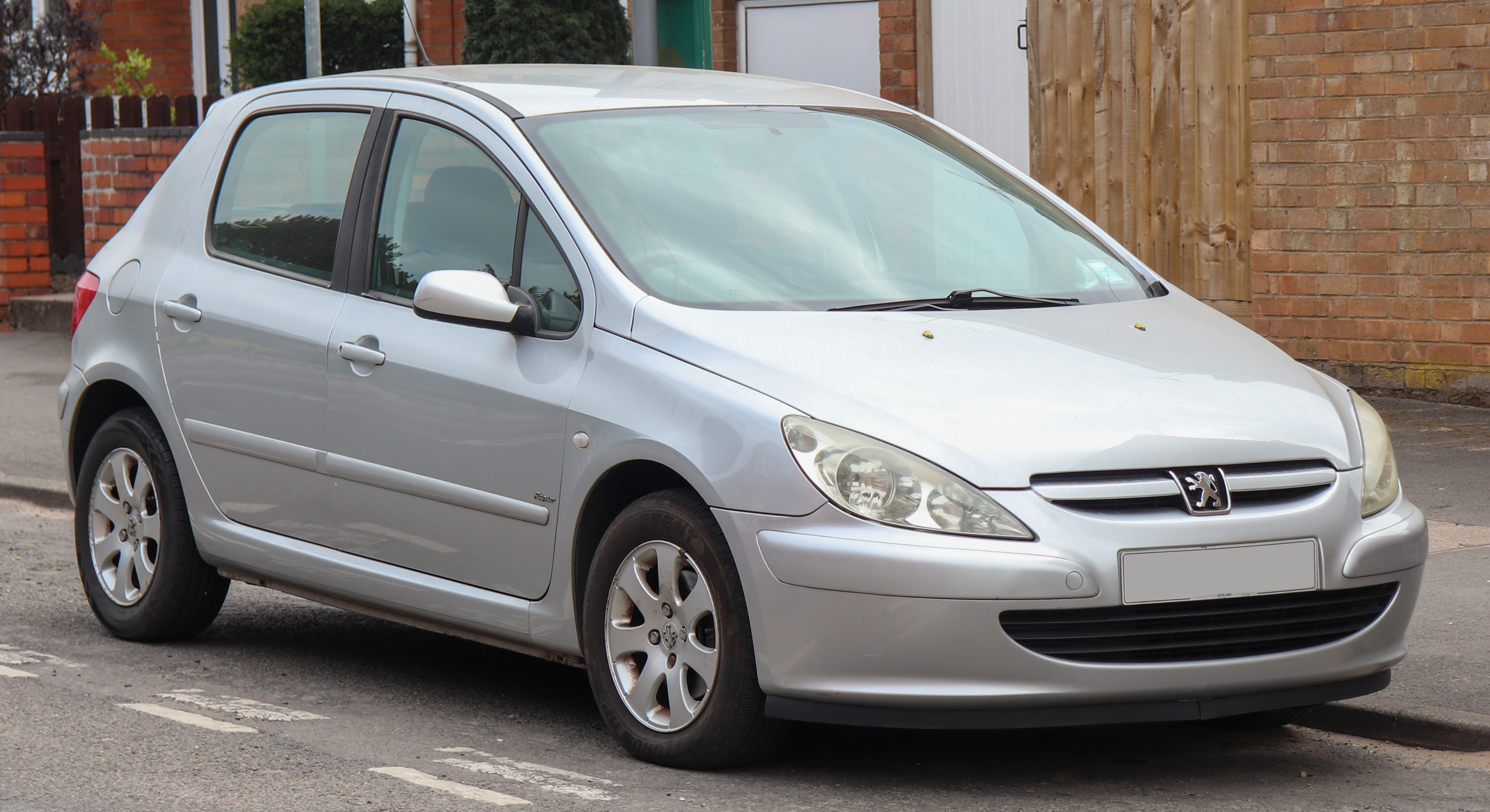

Overview
- Manufacturer: Peugeot (PSA Peugeot Citroën)
- Production: 2001–2008 (France); 2004–2011 (Argentina); 2001–2014 (China)
- Assembly: France: Mulhouse (Mulhouse Plant); France: Sochaux (Sochaux Plant); China: Wuhan (DPCA); Argentina: Villa Bosch; Argentina: El Palomar; Nigeria: Kaduna (PAN)
- Designer: Murat Günak

Body and chassis
- Class: Small family car (C)
- Body style: 3/5-door hatchback 2-door coupé cabriolet 5-door estate 4-door saloon
- Layout: Front-engine, front-wheel-drive
- Platform: PSA PF2 platform
- Related: Citroën C4; Citroën C4 Picasso; Peugeot 3008; Peugeot 308 I

Powertrain
- Engine: Petrol: 1.4 L TU3 8v I4; 1.4 L ET3 16v I4*; 1.6 L TU5 16v I4; 2.0 L EW10 16v I4; Diesel: 1.4 L DV4 HDi 8v I4; 1.6 L DV6 HDi 16v I4*; 2.0 L DW10 HDi 8v I4; 2.0 L DW10 HDi 16v I4*; * From model year 2004 onwards
- Transmission: 5/6-speed manual 4-speed ZF 4HP20 automatic 6-speed Aisin Aramox AF40/Aisin TF80SC automatic

Dimensions
- Wheelbase: 2,608 mm (102.7 in) (hatchback, coupé cabriolet) 2,612 mm (102.8 in) (sedan) 2,710 mm (106.7 in) (wagon)
- Length: 4,210 mm (165.7 in) (hatchback); 4,350 mm (171.3 in) (coupé cabriolet); 4,420 mm (174.0 in) (wagon); 4,470 mm (176.0 in) (sedan)
- Width: 1,730 mm (68.1 in)
- Height: 1,510 mm (59.4 in); 1,420 mm (55.9 in) (coupé cabriolet)

Chronology
- Predecessor: Peugeot 306
- Successor: Peugeot 308 (hatchback, wagon, coupé cabriolet); Peugeot 408 (saloon)

The Peugeot 307 is a small family car produced by the French automaker PSA Peugeot Citroën under their Peugeot marque, from 2001 to 2008 in Europe, and was the successor to the Peugeot 306, which was discontinued in 2002 after being in production for nine years. Using the PSA PF2 platform, it was awarded the European Car of the Year title for 2002, and continued to be offered in China and certain South American markets through 2014, despite the September 2007 French launch of the 308 (its intended successor), which is built on the same platform.

== History ==
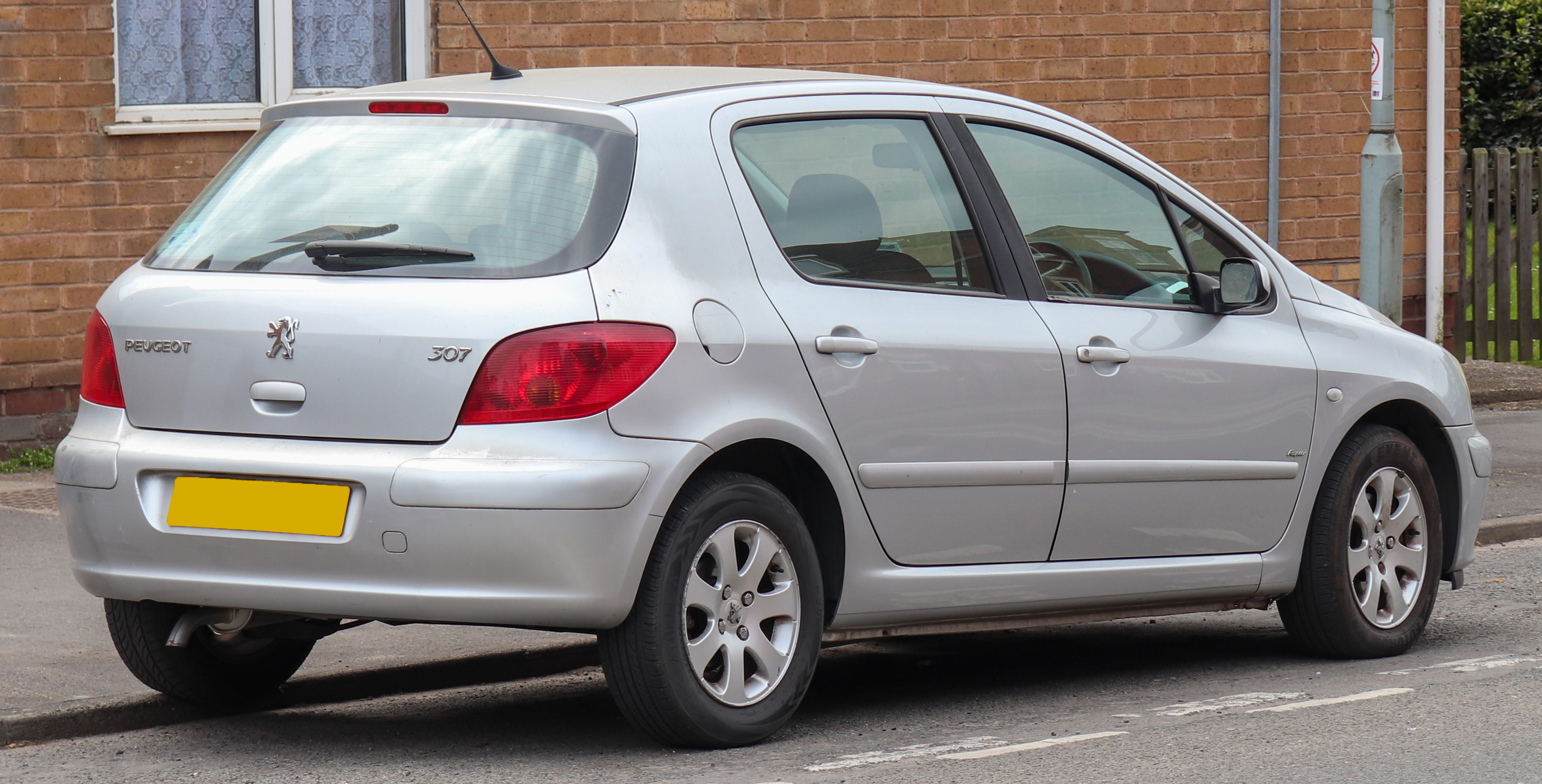
Peugeot 307 five-door hatchback (pre-facelift)

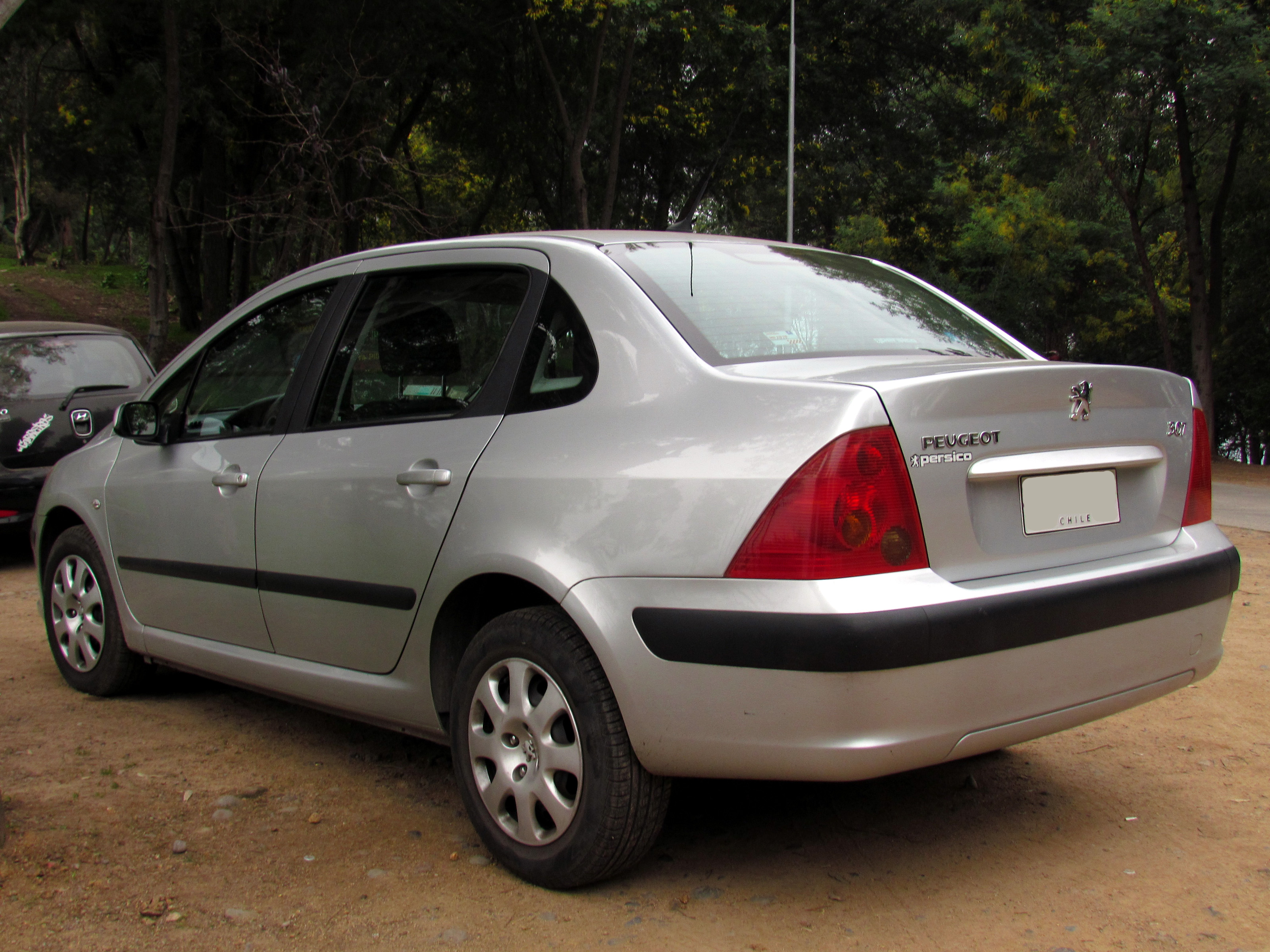
Peugeot 307 1.6 X Line Sedan

The 307 was announced as the 307 Prométhée prototype at the 2000 Mondial de l'Automobile. The production hatchback versions were introduced to the European markets on 26 April 2001, as a successor to the Peugeot 306. The 307 was also sold in Australia, New Zealand, Asia, and (in 1.6 and 2.0 petrol versions) Mexico.

In Brazil, the 307 was sold with 1.6 and 2.0 flex (gas/ethanol) engines.

== Design and engineering ==
The 307 makes use of a reworked 306 platform, that can also be found on the Citroën Xsara as well as the 1991 Citroën ZX. However, the car is larger than the 306 in every direction. The 307 continued the company's styling first seen on the Peugeot 206 and Peugeot 607.

With upswept front lights and a steeply rising bonnet leading to a highly sloped windscreen (and the upright rear doors first seen on the 206), the 307 departed from the Pininfarina designed themes employed on the previous two generations of Peugeots, as introduced with the Peugeot 205, and ending with the (evolutionary) Peugeot 406.

Its height is 1,510 mm (59.4 in), which is in the middle of the spectrum between small family cars (between 1400 and 1450 mm) and compact MPVs (between 1600 and 1650 mm). Some consider the 307 as a low compact MPV rather than a tall small family car, because of its height and profile.

One advertisement for the 307, which was released upon its launch in 2001, featured the song, "(Something Inside) So Strong" by British singer-songwriter Labi Siffre.

== Top Gear ==
In a report from Top Gear Magazine in June 2001, the new Peugeot 307 1.6 16v TU5JP4 went head to head with its competitors, the Ford Focus 1.6L I4 Zetec SE and Honda Civic 1.6 VTEC. The Peugeot received high praise in all areas of the road test, beating both the Ford and Honda on price, space, handling, running costs and refinement.

The 307 won the road test, followed by the Focus and the Civic respectively.

== Facelift ==
In June 2005, the 307 was revised to meet the competition of improved rivals which had been launched since the introduction of the 307 four years earlier. The front of the car was restyled featuring mildly revised lights, a new bonnet, updated instrument cluster, and the removal of the trademark Peugeot grille between the headlights. With the latter change, along with a new front bumper, the front of the car featured a larger air intake, as first established on the Peugeot 407, and which became effectively the company's new grille.

== Body styles ==
The 307 was launched as a three- and five-door hatchback, though in February 2002, the range of the 307 was expanded with the introduction of two estates, the 307 Break and 307 SW. Externally the two estates are almost identical, however, the SW version has silver roof bars and a three/four length panoramic glass roof as standard equipment.

Internally though, the 307 Break is a conventional estate, while the SW features an optional third row of removable seats, so it is more flexible due to its MPV-like configuration. The SW exists, because Peugeot did not develop a compact MPV spinoff, as Citroën did with the Xsara Picasso, instead preferring to offer a more flexible version, but maintaining the style and road manners of an estate.

Unlike the previous model, there was no saloon version, but one was designed for emerging markets, such as China and the market in Latin America, as saloons were much preferred to hatchbacks. The 307 CC, a cabriolet with a retractable hardtop, was launched in August 2003, to compete against the new European coupé cabriolets.

A new, four-door saloon version of the 307 was launched in China in June 2004. The 307 is produced for the market in China by the Dongfeng Peugeot-Citroën Automobile, a joint venture with the PSA Group. This model was also built in Argentina between May 2006 and November 2010. It was also exported to Brazil, although sales were never satisfactory in either country. In 2006, the Argentinian version contained 60% local parts. Chinese production ended in 2014.

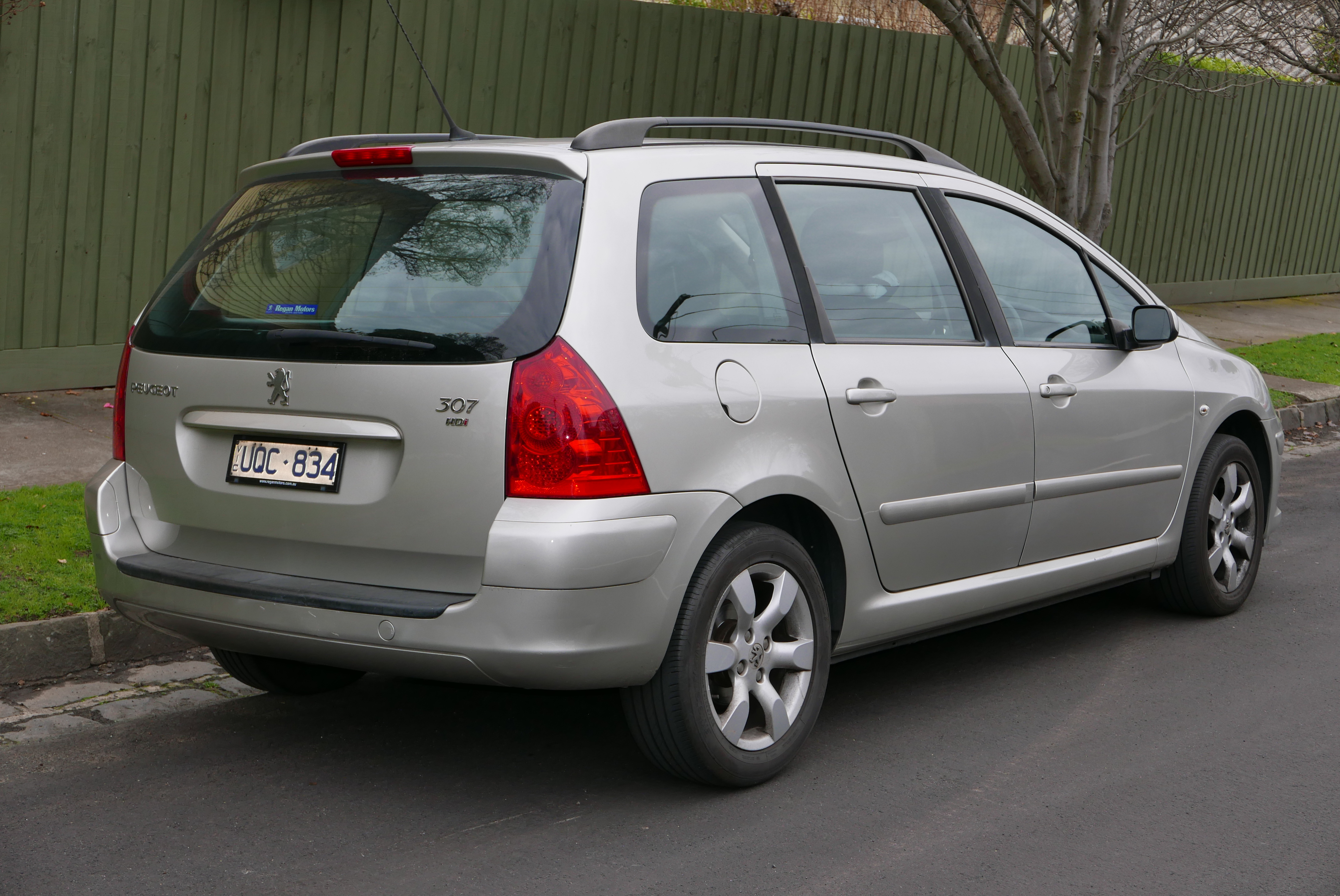
Facelifted Peugeot 307 SW (station wagon/estate)

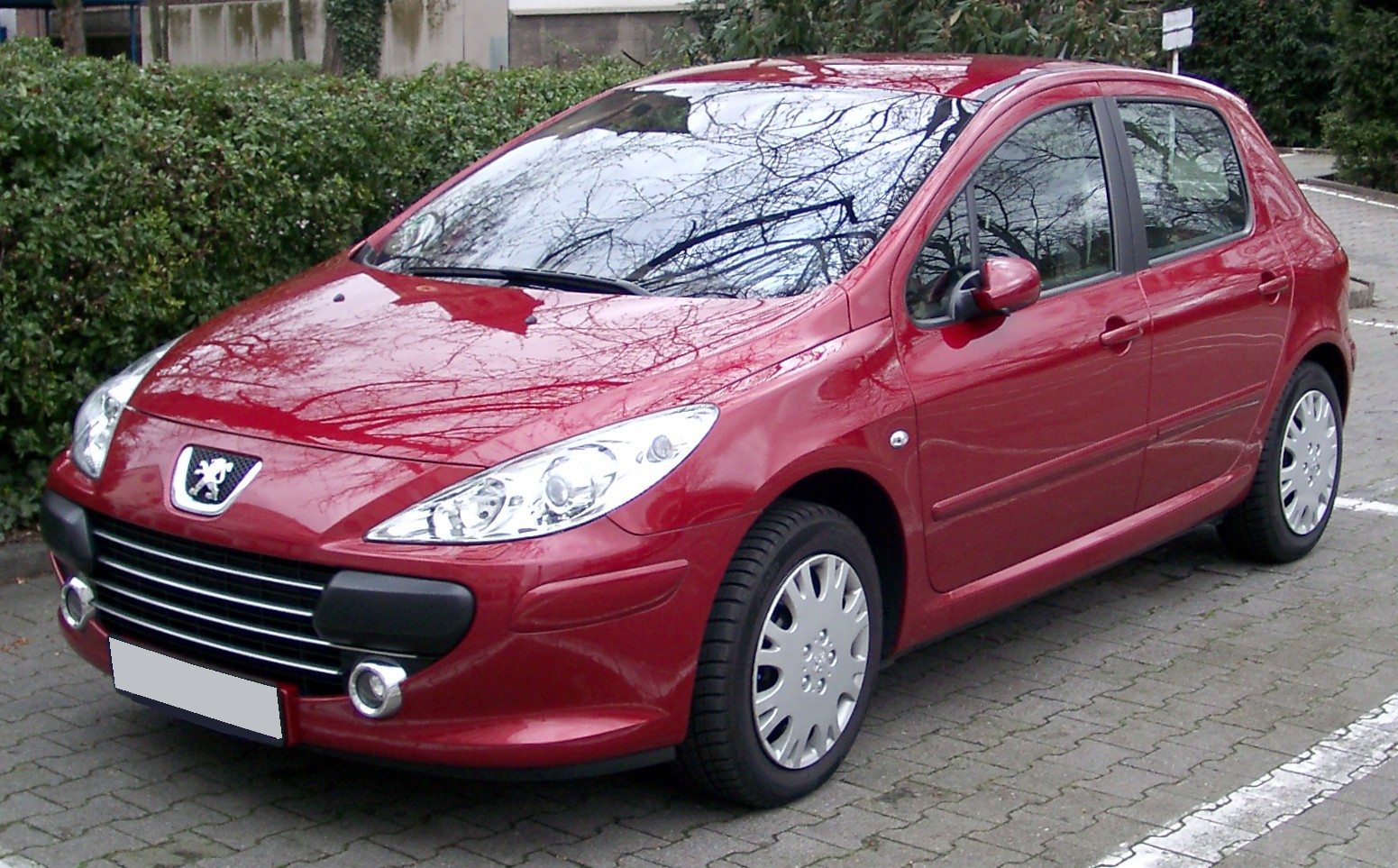
Facelifted Peugeot 307 (hatchback, front)

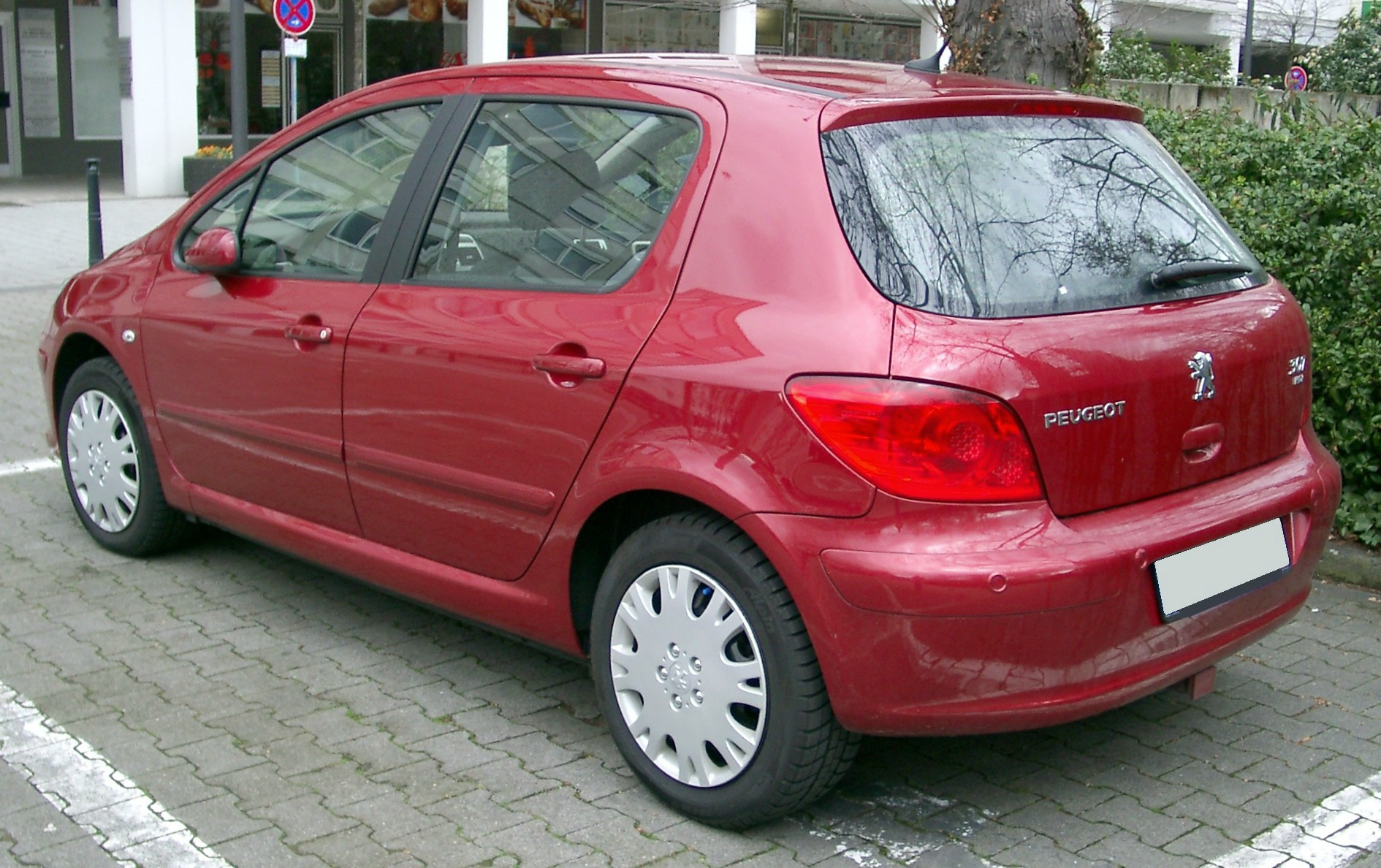
Facelifted Peugeot 307 (hatchback, rear)

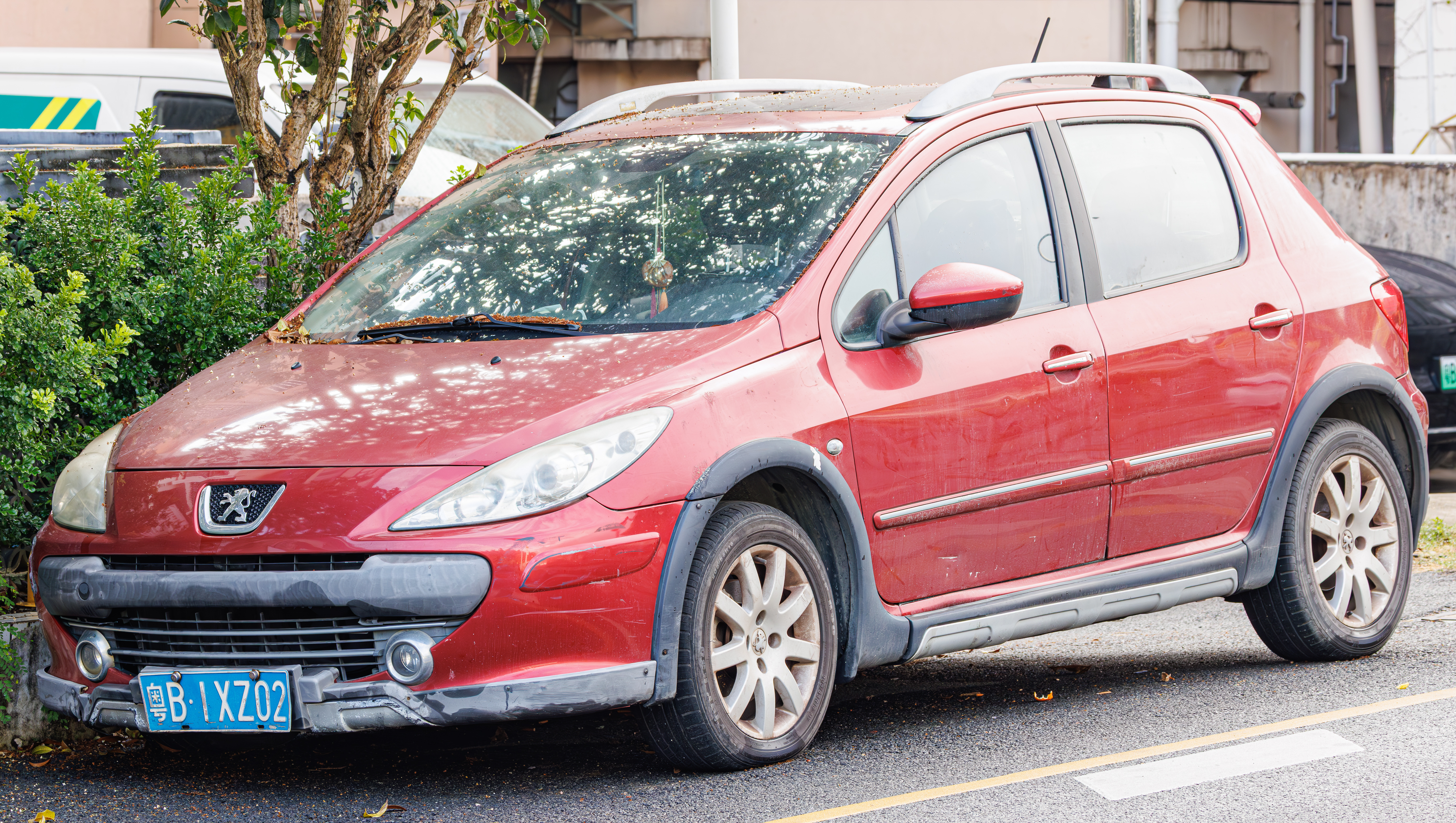
Facelifted Peugeot 307 Cross (China, front)

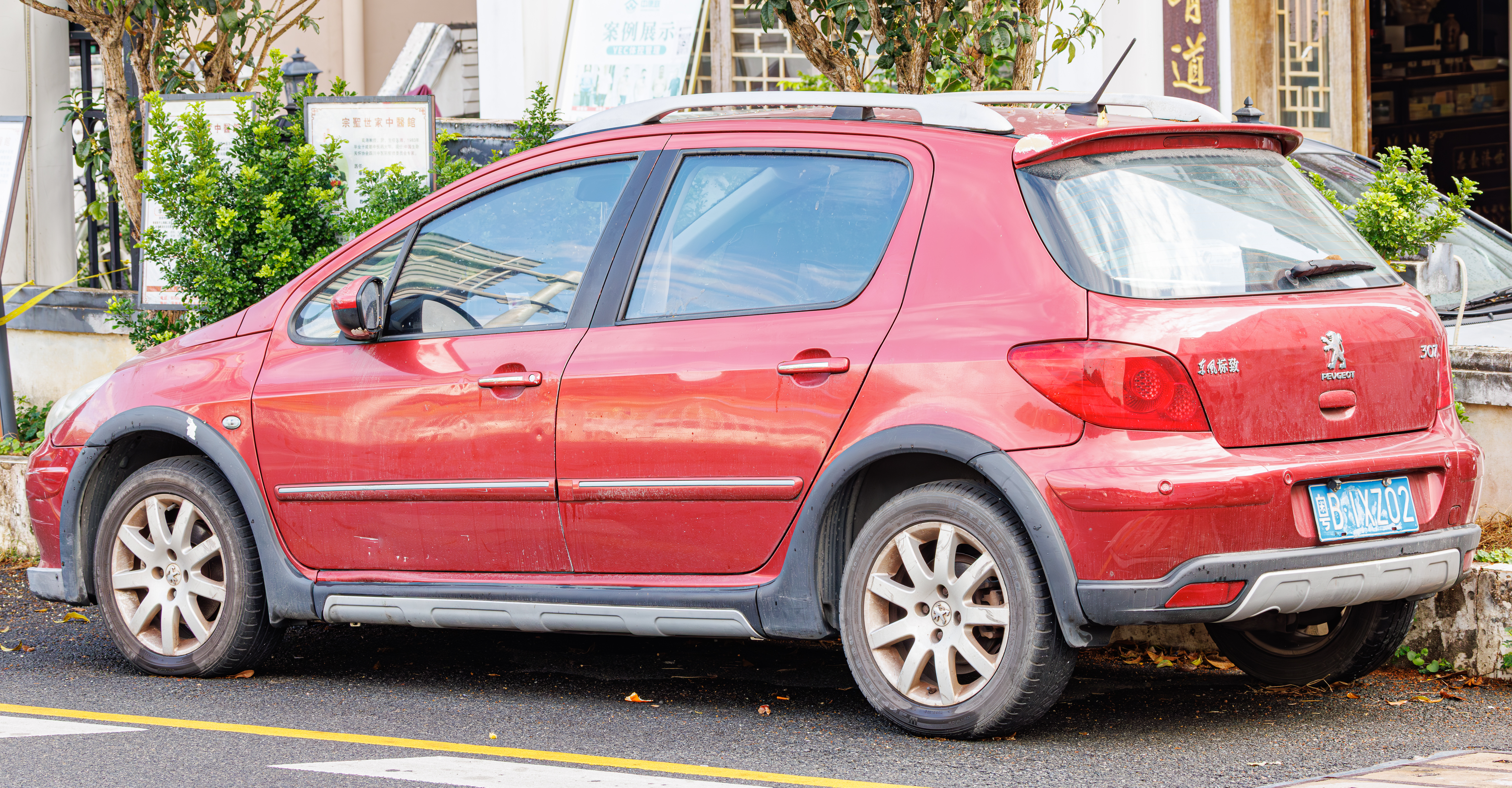
Facelifted Peugeot 307 Cross (China, rear)

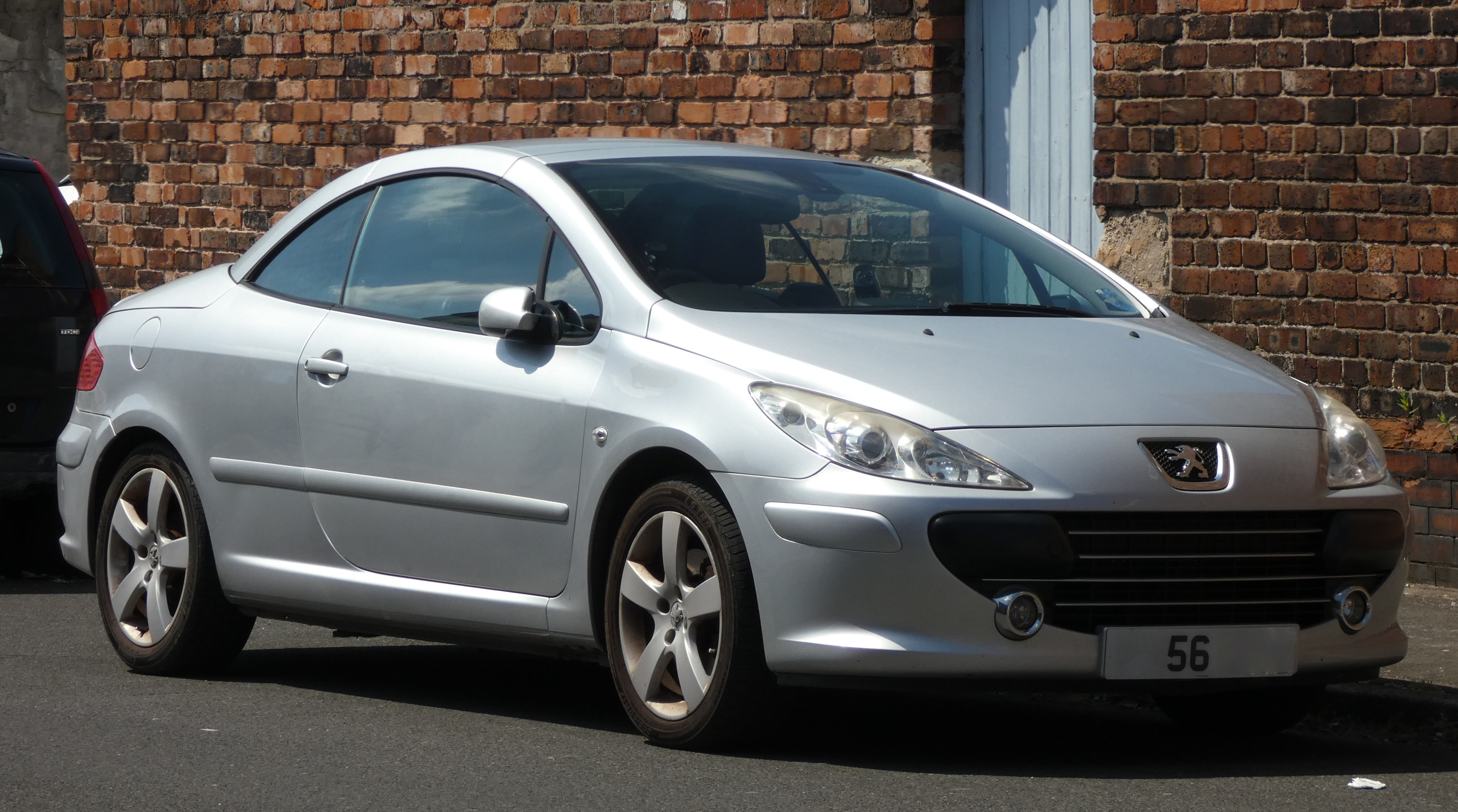
Facelifted Peugeot 307 CC (cabriolet, front)

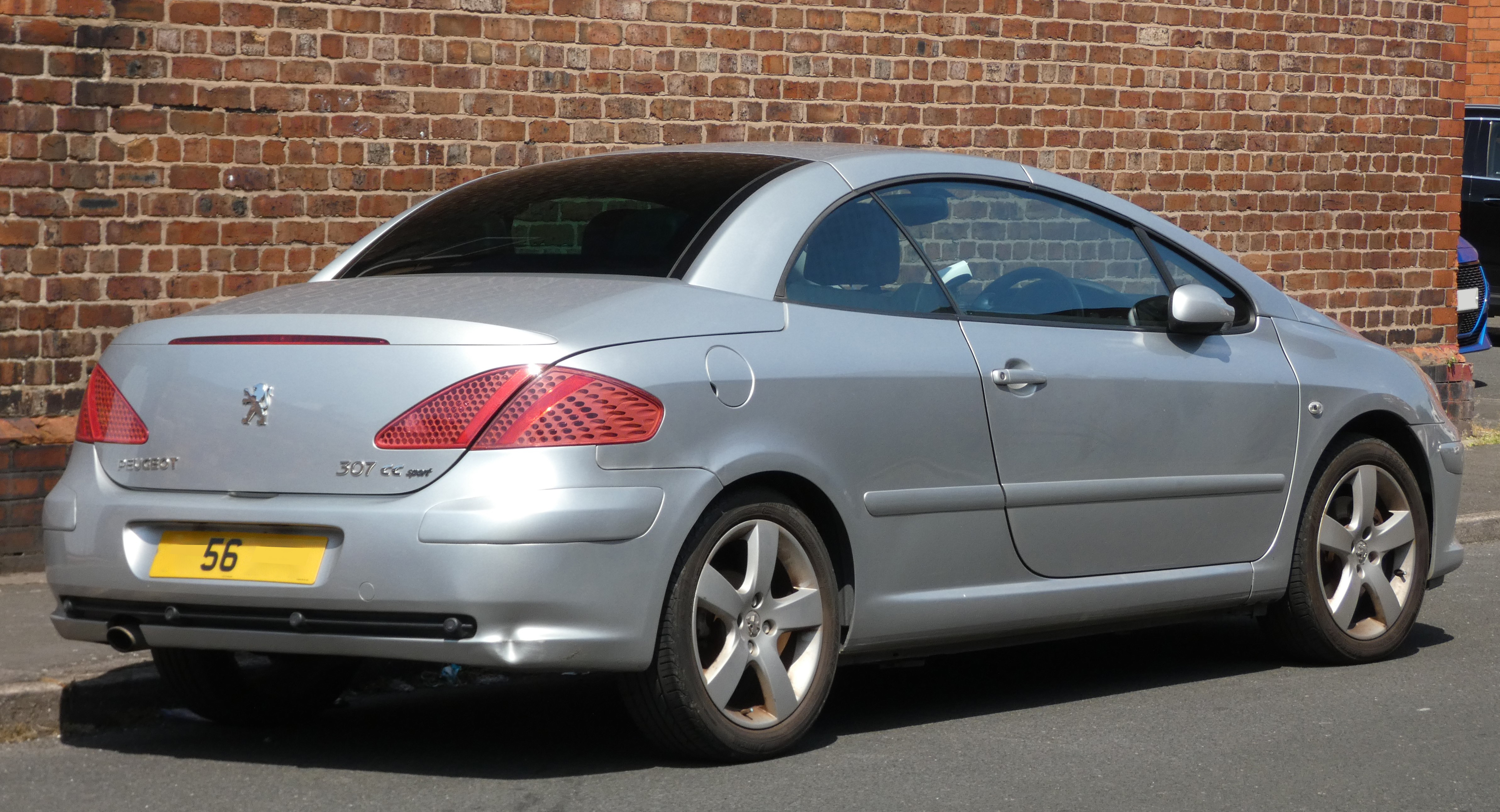
Facelifted Peugeot 307 CC (cabriolet, rear)

== Engines ==
=== Petrol ===
- 1.4 L (1360 cc) TU3 I4, 75 PS (55 kW; 74 hp) and 111 N⋅m (82 lb⋅ft)
- 1.4 L (1360 cc) ET3 16-valve I4, 90 PS (66 kW; 89 hp) and 133 N⋅m (98 lb⋅ft)
- 1.6 L (1587 cc) TU5 16-valve I4, 110 PS (81 kW; 108 hp) and 147 N⋅m (108 lb⋅ft)
- 2.0 L (1997 cc) EW10 16-valve I4, 136 PS (100 kW; 134 hp) and 190 N⋅m (140 lb⋅ft)
- 2.0 L (1997 cc) EW10 16-valve I4, 140 PS (103 kW; 138 hp) and 200 N⋅m (148 lb⋅ft)
- 2.0 L (1997 cc) EW10 16-valve I4, 177 PS (130 kW; 175 hp) and 202 N⋅m (149 lb⋅ft)

For the 1.6 L setup also available (from 09/2007 onwards) is a version called 1.6 BioFlex, that can as well run on ethanol E85.

=== Diesel ===
- 1.4 L (1398 cc) DV4TD HDi I4, 68 PS (50 kW; 67 hp) and 150 N⋅m (111 lb⋅ft)
- 1.6 L (1560 cc) DV6ATED4 HDi 16-valve I4, 90 PS (66 kW; 89 hp) and 215 N⋅m (159 lb⋅ft)
- 1.6 L (1560 cc) DV6TED4 HDi 16-valve I4, 109 PS (80 kW; 108 hp) and 240 N⋅m (177 lb⋅ft)
- 2.0 L (1997 cc) DW10A HDi I4, 90 PS (66 kW; 89 hp) and 205 N⋅m (151 lb⋅ft)
- 2.0 L (1997 cc) DW10ATED HDi I4, 107 PS (79 kW; 106 hp) and 250 N⋅m (184 lb⋅ft)
- 2.0 L (1997 cc) DW10TED4 HDi 16-valve I4, 136 PS (100 kW; 134 hp) and 320 N⋅m (236 lb⋅ft)

=== Hybrid HDi ===
In January 2006, Peugeot announced a prototype diesel-electric hybrid engine for the 307 that could achieve 83 miles per imperial gallon (3.4 L/100 km; 69 mpg_{‑US}), but was not intended for sale until at least 2010. By that time, the 307 had been replaced by the 308 and the hybrid remained stillborn. The Citroën C4 Hybride HDi was announced at the same time.

== Reliability ==
According to some sources, the 307 suffers from below-average build quality and reliability, having featured at the bottom of the German Automobile Club breakdown statistics for 3- to 5-year-old small family cars in 2009. However, June 2005 saw a facelift within the model and reliability increased, making it a more popular model. 2006/2007 models were referenced as a lot more reliable and trustworthy.

== Motorsport ==
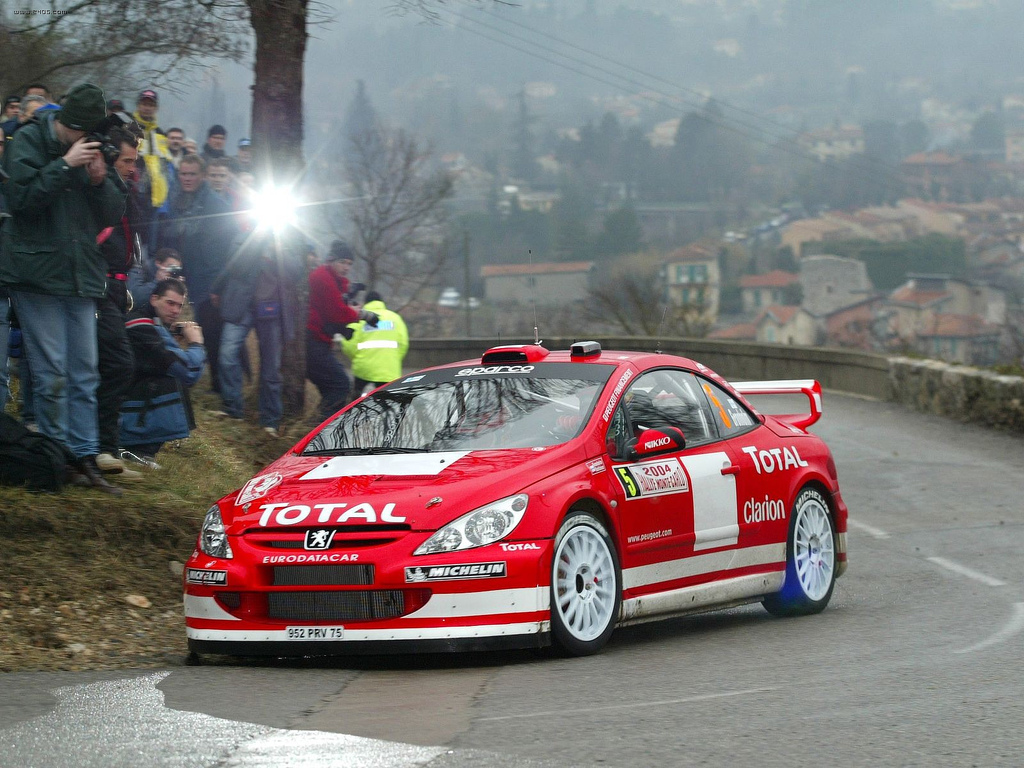
Marcus Grönholm driving his 307 WRC at the 2004 Monte Carlo Rally.

The Peugeot 307 WRC, a World Rally Car based on the 307 CC, replaced the championship-winning 206 WRC in the World Rally Championship for the season of 2004.

The vehicle was plagued by transmission problems throughout its career, and the works team's drivers' driving styles did not suit the car's handling characteristics. In 2004, the car took seven podiums and a maiden win in Rally Finland, but it was not able to challenge for the championship as Marcus Grönholm finished fifth in the drivers' championship and Peugeot fourth in the manufacturers' championship.

The season of 2005 was more successful, and Peugeot was a serious challenger for the manufacturers' championship, leading the championship after round 10, but the challenge faded after Markko Märtin's retirement from rallying. Peugeot ultimately finished second in the manufacturers' championship, while Grönholm finished third in the drivers' championship, tied on points with second-placed Petter Solberg. Grönholm took victories at Rally Finland and Rally Japan along with six other podium finishes, while Märtin took four further podiums.

The car saw its factory-supported competition life cut short at the end of 2005 by PSA's decision to withdraw the factory teams of both Citroën and Peugeot from top-level rallying. A private undertaking by seasoned Peugeot preparatory firm Bozian Racing, dubbed OMV Peugeot Norway World Rally Team, largely assumed responsibility for the running of WRC specification 307s for the following season of 2006. Manfred Stohl and Henning Solberg were named as the driving personnel. Stohl impressively placed fourth in the overall drivers' standings, and the 307 WRC took seven podiums by privateer teams that season.

Overall, the car has three WRC victories and 26 podiums to its name, Marcus Grönholm having driven it to the top of the podium in the series at the Rally Finland in 2004 and 2005 as well as at the Rally Japan in 2005.

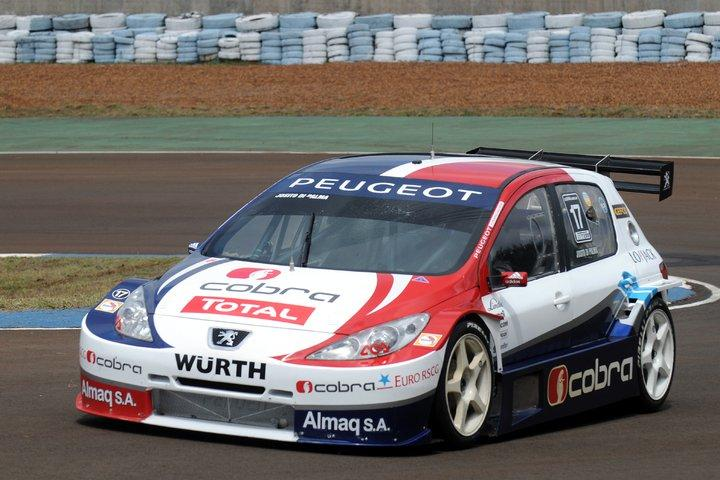
Luis José Di Palma's 307 during the 2010 TC 2000 season.

The 307 WRC will be remembered for the accident that befell WRC competitors Markko Märtin and Michael Park on September 18, 2005, which resulted in co-driver Park's death. On stage 15 of Wales Rally GB, Märtin lost control of his 307 WRC and collided with a tree, killing Park instantly. This was the first fatality in a WRC event since Rodger Freeth in 1993.

The Peugeot 307 has also been raced in the World Touring Car Championship, the British Touring Car Championship, Stock Car Brasil, TC2000 and the Danish Touring Car Championship.

=== WRC Victories ===
No.	Event	Season	Driver	Co-driver
1	2004 Rally Finland	2004	(Finland) Marcus Grönholm	(Finland) Timo Rautiainen
2	2005 Rally Finland	2005	(Finland) Marcus Grönholm	(Finland) Timo Rautiainen
3	2005 Rally Japan	2005	(Finland) Marcus Grönholm	(Finland) Timo Rautiainen

== Sales ==
Year	Worldwide Production	Worldwide sales	Notes
2004	TBA	583,700	
2005	TBA	520,400	
2006	TBA	447,000	
2007	TBA	369,100	
2008	TBA	142,300	
2009	84,300	93,600	
2010	87,700	86,900	
2011	67,174	71,531	Total production reaches 3,677,711 units.
2012	103,300	103,000	Total production reaches 3,781,000 units.

== Safety ==
ANCAP test results Peugeot 307 5 door hatch (2001)
Test	Score
Overall	4 /5 stars
Frontal offset	11.60/16
Side impact	16/16
Pole	2/2
Seat belt reminders	0/3
Whiplash protection	Not Assessed
Pedestrian protection	Marginal
Electronic stability control	Not Assessed

ANCAP test results Peugeot 307CC variant(s) as tested (2001)
Test	Score
Overall	4 /5 stars
Frontal offset	13.08/16
Side impact	15.26/16
Pole	Not Assessed
Seat belt reminders	1/3
Whiplash protection	Not Assessed
Pedestrian protection	Marginal
Electronic stability control	Not Assessed

== See also ==
- Peugeot 307 WRC
