= List of fatal World Rally Championship accidents =

The list of fatal World Rally Championship accidents consists of drivers and co-drivers who have died at FIA World Rally Championship (WRC) rallies. The list also includes fatal accidents in the International Championship for Manufacturers (IMC), the predecessor to the World Rally Championship, which was contested from 1970 to 1972. Well-known fatalities involving officials, spectators and team members are also mentioned.

The fatal accidents of the Group B era resulted in its demise. Only hours after Henri Toivonen's crash at the 1986 Tour de Corse, FISA president Jean-Marie Balestre announced that Group B cars were banned for the 1987 season. However, driver fatalities peaked in 1989, when five competitors died in the first three rallies of the season (two during reconnaissance, two who were spectating having only done reconnaissance for the event, and only one as an active competitor). Markko Märtin's co-driver Michael Park's death at the 2005 Wales Rally GB was the WRC's first fatality in over eleven years. In April 2023 Hyundai driver Craig Breen died in a crash. He was in Croatia conducting his pre-event test for the 2023 Croatia Rally in the week leading up to the reconnaissance and rally itself.

== Drivers and co-drivers fatalities ==
=== IMC ===
Name	Role	Date of accident	Event	Car	During
(Japan) Eiichi Morinishi	Driver	February 1970	(Kenya) 1970 East African Safari Rally	(Japan) Datsun 1600 SSS	Reconnaissance
(Uganda) David Ndahura	Driver	28 March 1970	(Kenya) 1970 East African Safari Rally	(United States) Ford Cortina GT	Rally
(Kenya) Cyrus Kamundia	Driver	March 1971	(Kenya) 1971 East African Safari Rally	(Japan) Datsun	Reconnaissance
(France) Christian Serradori (Note: Unlike Corriere della Sera and Sport Auto, 28 June issue of Autosprint reports the last name of the French brothers as "Ferradori". The brothers died during the third stage of the rally, on Col de l'Iseran mountain pass, when their Lancia Fulvia went off the road and fell 200 meters (660 ft) into a ravine.)	Driver	25 June 1971	(France) 1971 Coupe des Alpes (Note: Because the 1971 Coupe des Alpes (Alpine Rally) ran with an insufficient number of starters, no points were awarded towards the championship.)	(Italy) Lancia Fulvia	Rally
(France) Yves Serradori	Co-driver	25 June 1971	(France) 1971 Coupe des Alpes	(Italy) Lancia Fulvia	Rally

=== WRC ===
Name	Role	Date of accident	Event	Car	During
(Finland) Seppo Jämsä	Co-driver	2 August 1974	(Finland) 1974 1000 Lakes Rally	(United Kingdom) Morris Mini 850	Rally
(United Kingdom) Don Daly	Co-driver	27 November 1976	(United Kingdom) 1976 RAC Rally	(Sweden) Saab 99 EMS	Rally
(Brazil) Tomas Fuchs	Driver	14 August 1982	(Brazil) 1982 Rallye do Brasil	(Italy) Fiat 147	Rally
(Finland) Reijo Nygren	Co-driver	26 August 1983	(Finland) 1983 1000 Lakes Rally	(United Kingdom) Ford Escort RS	Rally
(Italy) Attilio Bettega	Driver	2 May 1985	(France) 1985 Tour de Corse	(Italy) Lancia 037 Rally	Rally
(Finland) Henri Toivonen	Driver	2 May 1986	(France) 1986 Tour de Corse	(Italy) Lancia Delta S4	Rally
(United States) Sergio Cresto	Co-driver	2 May 1986	(France) 1986 Tour de Corse	(Italy) Lancia Delta S4	Rally
(France) Jean-Michel Argenti	Co-driver	7 May 1987	(France) 1987 Tour de Corse	(France) Peugeot 205 GTI	Rally
(France) Jean-Marc Dubois	Driver	11 October 1988	(Italy) 1988 Rallye Sanremo	(France) Citroën AX Sport	Rally
(France) Robert Moynier	Co-driver	11 October 1988	(Italy) 1988 Rallye Sanremo	(France) Citroën AX Sport	Rally
(Belgium) George Mignot	Driver	2 January 1989	(Sweden) 1989 Swedish Rally	(Germany) Volkswagen Golf	Reconnaissance
(Belgium) Bernard de Lathuy	Co-driver	2 January 1989	(Sweden) 1989 Swedish Rally	(Germany) Volkswagen Golf	Reconnaissance
(Sweden) Lars-Erik Torph	Driver	23 January 1989	(Monaco) 1989 Monte Carlo Rally	(Italy) Lancia Delta Integrale	Rally (Note: Lars-Erik Torph and Bertil-Rune Rehnfeldt only did the reconnaissance for the event, and then were spectating the fifth stage when Alex Fiorio lost control of his Lancia Delta Integrale, went off the road and crashed into them at about 145 km/h (90 mph).)
(Sweden) Bertil-Rune Rehnfeldt	Co-driver	23 January 1989	(Monaco) 1989 Monte Carlo Rally	(Italy) Lancia Delta Integrale	Rally
(Portugal) Augusto Mendes	Driver	1 March 1989	1989 Rallye de Portugal	(Germany) Opel Kadett GSI	Rally
(France) Francis Malaussene	Co-driver	22 January 1990	(Monaco) 1990 Monte Carlo Rally	(France) Renault 5 GT Turbo	Rally
(New Zealand) Rodger Freeth	Co-driver	18 September 1993	1993 Rally Australia	(Japan) Subaru Legacy RS	Rally
(United Kingdom) Michael Park	Co-driver	18 September 2005	2005 Wales Rally GB	(France) Peugeot 307 WRC	Rally
(Germany) Jörg Bastuck	Co-driver	24 March 2006	(Catalonia) 2006 Rally Catalunya	(France) Citroën C2 S1600	Rally (Note: Following a crash on the second stage, JWRC contestant Aaron Burkart's co-driver Jörg Bastuck was changing a wheel when he was struck by the Ford Fiesta ST driven by Stobart M-Sport Ford's Barry Clark, who had lost control of his car and gone off at the same place.)
(Republic of Ireland) Craig Breen	Driver	13 April 2023	2023 Croatia Rally	(South Korea) Hyundai i20 N Rally1	Pre-event test

== Other fatalities ==
=== Team members ===
At the 1975 Safari Rally, a service car with four mechanics crashed into a truck near Mombasa. Carlino Dacista, Brian Fernandez and Willie Uis died instantly. The driver David Joshi sustained serious injuries. At the 1978 Monte Carlo Rally, two mechanics, Bernard Balmer and Georges Reinier, died when their van collided with a truck near Gap, Hautes-Alpes. On the second day of the 1987 Rallye Côte d'Ivoire, Toyota Team Europe's Cessna 340 crashed and exploded, killing all four inside; manager and former co-driver Henry Liddon, his assistant Nigel Harris, the pilot and the navigator. Team manager Ove Andersson withdrew Toyota from the event. Prior to the accident, Björn Waldegård and Fred Gallagher had been running second in their Toyota Supra Turbo. At the 1996 Safari Rally, competed in bad weather and rain, three British mechanics drowned while attempting to cross a river with their Land Rover.

=== Officials ===
At the end of the fourth stage of the 1981 1000 Lakes Rally, Audi Sport driver Franz Wittmann and his co-driver Kurt Nestinger did not notice the flying finish which marks the end of the stage. They continued at race speed with their Quattro and crashed into a group of people standing in front of a van. Raul Falin, chairman of AKK, Finland's sporting authority for motorsport and the country's representative in the FIA, was quickly taken to a hospital but died from his injuries soon after. Boris Rung, co-founder and chairman of the European Rallycross Association and member of FIA's Off-Road Commission, survived the accident along with Greek FIA observer Costas Glossotis.

=== Spectators ===
At the 1978 Safari Rally, five passers-by and four spectators were killed in unrelated accidents, both involving non-competitive drivers crashing into competitors.

On the first stage of the 1986 Rally Portugal, Joaquim Santos lost control of his Ford RS200 while trying to avoid spectators on the road, crashing into a crowd of spectators, killing three and injuring over thirty. All the factory teams – Audi, Austin Rover, Ford, Lancia, Peugeot and Volkswagen – withdrew from the event.

At the 1996 1000 Lakes Rally, at a special stage that took place in the centre of Jyväskylä, one spectator died and 36 were injured when Danish driver Karsten Richardt lost control of his Mitsubishi Lancer Evolution. Rikhard reached the curve at 120 kilometres per hour (75 mph), finally hitting the crowd at 40 kilometres per hour (25 mph).

At the 2017 Monte Carlo Rally, a spectator died after Hayden Paddon slid his Hyundai i20 wide on a left-hand corner and went rear-first on the roadside embankment.
