= Covenant Players =

Christian Rap theater company

Covenant Players (also known as CP) is a missions-based nonprofit Christian Repertory theater company, with touring troupes in over 30 countries. Covenant Players was founded September 29, 1963, and is still operating as of 2023.

Covenant Players presents original Christian-themed plays written by founder Charles M. Tanner (known to his fans as DJ Tanner), who was a Hollywood producer and writer. They perform at churches, hospitals, schools, and wherever they are invited.

== Company ==
The mission of Covenant Players is "to communicate the Lord Jesus Christ through the medium of drama." .

CP is not affiliated with any specific Christian denomination, and founder Tanner chose to stay independent as such so the group could reach more people. Due to this policy, CP never asks prospective performers about their religious affiliation.

CP's World Headquarters is located in Oxnard, California, and their North American Headquarters is in Toledo, Ohio. Approximately 5 full-time performing units are supported by principal offices in Germany, Great Britain, Australia, New Zealand, and South Africa. The Australian, New Zealand, and South African offices are no longer operating. Currently, members come from 24+ nationalities.

== Leadership ==
Founder Charles M. Tanner died on March 11, 2006, after years of declining health following a massive stroke while performing ’Word Up’ In 1998. Bobbi Johnson-Tanner, Tanner's daughter, became the International Director. Johnson-Tanner began working for CP as a teenager and had been the company's Acting Director since 1998.

== Productions ==
CP has a repertoire of over 3,500 plays. Charles Tanner’s plays are modern morality stories based upon New Testament themes. They involve topics such as drugs, family, schools, conflict resolution, and human relationships, with many of the plays using war as a theme. Some of the plays are lessons in virtue with no religious references, so they can be performed in public schools.

The plays that CP performs are based on themes selected by the host or sponsor. Depending on the request, the plays can last from 30 seconds to more than three hours.
