= Ephraim Anderson =

British bacteriologist

Ephraim Saul "Andy" Anderson, CBE, FRS (28 October 1911 – 14 March 2006) was a British bacteriologist, best known for his work highlighting the human health dangers of drug-resistant bacteria created by antibiotics, in particular by low-dose antibiotic use in animal feeding.

== Biography ==
Anderson was born of Estonian-Jewish immigrants in a working-class area of Newcastle upon Tyne, and educated at Rutherford College before winning a scholarship to attend Durham University's Medical School. He served in the Royal Army Medical Corps during the Second World War. Anderson won worldwide recognition for his work on the plasmids that render the bacteria responsible for typhoid fever and bacterial food poisoning insensitive to antibiotics. Anderson was director of the Enteric Reference Laboratory of the Public Health Laboratory Service, between 1954 and 1978. He was made a fellow of the Royal Society in 1968 and appointed a CBE in 1976. He died in London at the age of 94.
