= Umberto Gerli =

Italian ice hockey player

Personal information
- Nationality: Italian
- Born: 4 December 1925; Milan, Italy
- Died: 3 March 2006 (aged 80)

Sport
- Sport: Ice hockey

Umberto Gerli (4 December 1925 – 3 March 2006) was an Italian ice hockey player. He competed in the men's tournament at the 1948 Winter Olympics.
