= William Herskovic =

Holocaust survivor and humanitarian

- Born: June 1914; Hungary
- Died: March 3, 2006 (aged 91)
- Known for: Holocaust survivor
- Notable work: Bel Air Camera

William Herskovic (June 1914 – March 3, 2006) was a Holocaust survivor and humanitarian. His escape from Auschwitz in 1942 and early eyewitness testimony inspired Belgium's opposition to Nazi Germany during World War II, and alerted the Resistance to the atrocities that were taking place in the concentration camps. Because of Herskovic's escape and testimony, hundreds of lives were saved.

Herskovic is also the founder of Bel Air Camera, which was a veritable landmark in Los Angeles, which he established in 1957, and has received numerable awards for his philanthropy.

== Early life ==
Herskovic was born in June 1914 in what was then Hungary.

His mother died when he was only 6 months old, and his father had many children by a second wife, so he was raised mainly by his maternal grandparents.

Herskovic, who spoke 9 languages, dropped out of school at the age of 13 in order to take his brother's place as a photographer's apprentice. By the age of 15 he was running photo studios across Czechoslovakia and winning awards as an artist for his skill in photographic retouching.

By the age of 17, he had started his own photo studio, Studio Willy, that quickly gained fame across Belgium.

He married his first wife, Esther, and they had two girls—Giselle (Katie) Herskovic, born in 1938, and Germaine Herskovic, born in 1941.

== Holocaust experiences ==
Herskovic's businesses were confiscated by the Germans and he, his wife and their two baby girls were sent to a concentration camp. Although he wouldn't find out until a long time later, his wife and two daughters were killed in a gas chamber almost immediately upon their arrival.

Herskovic was sent to an Auschwitz hard labor camp where he wasn't expected to live long on about 130 calories a day.

Herskovic set about planning an escape, and on the first night of Hanukkah, 1942, Herskovic and two others dug a pair of wire cutters out from beneath layers of snow where they had hidden them, and cut through chain-link fences during a blizzard.

Herskovic's forged "Peter Dobos" identity papers

The three ran through the snow for hours towards freedom.

Herskovic then warned the Belgian underground of what was going on in the camps. "Do not go peacefully, they are killing us by the thousands," he is quoted as saying in Escape to Life: A Journey Through the Holocaust, his biography.

The resistance quickly mobilized, stopping a transport train and rescuing hundreds bound for the camps.

"His survival saved hundreds," according to a Simon Wiesenthal Center tribute.

Herskovic then went undercover, carefully crafting false papers and getting a job camouflaging the beaches of Normandy, where he was in fact observing military installations and drawing sketches to send back to the resistance.

== After the war ==
Herskovic, discovering that his wife and children had been killed, asked his first wife's younger sister, Maria, for her hand in marriage (her husband had also been killed in the Holocaust). She accepted.

They had three children, all girls, and moved to America. In Los Angeles, Herskovic founded Bel Air Camera in 1957 in Westwood Village, which closed in 2015 after 58 years in business.

From the moment he immigrated to the U.S. with his wife, Mireille, they began their lifelong dedication to philanthropy. He was a founding supporter of the U.S. Holocaust Museum in Washington, D.C. and was also involved with the Simon Wiesenthal Museum of Tolerance in hopes, "that education and awareness will prevent prejudice and hatred in the future." Additionally, he and his wife were supporters of numerous organizations including: UJF, ADL, Friends of Sheba Medical Center, Friends of Israel Disabled Veterans, Technion, UCLA's Hillel, Milken Community High School, Stephen S. Wise Temple, The Jesters, Israel Cancer Research Fund, and others.

== Awards ==
Throughout his life, Herskovic received numerous awards for his heroic and philanthropic work. Most recently, he was given the Humanitarian Award by the Israel Cancer Research Fund.

== Death ==
William Herskovic died on March 3, 2006, at his home in Encino, California. He was 91. Herskovic is survived by his wife, Maria, their three children, four grandchildren and great-grandchild.
