= Mark R. V. Southern =

Indo-Europeanist and professor of German and linguistics

Mark Roderick Vendrell Southern (3 March 1961 – 15 March 2006) was an Indo-Europeanist and professor of German and linguistics.

His research and teaching interests spanned the fields of Linguistics, Classics, Literature, Near Eastern Studies, and Religion. He specialized in historical and Indo-European linguistics, language contact and sociolinguistics, Greek and Latin linguistics, the pre-Islamic Middle East, and Sanskrit. He also commanded some competency in a wide range of languages, including Ancient Greek, Latin, Sanskrit, Hittite, Old Persian, Classical Armenian, Yiddish, Hebrew, Norse, Old English, Frisian, Old Saxon, Old Irish, Breton, German, French, Italian, Spanish, Portuguese, and Russian.

== Life and career ==
Southern was born in Cambridge, England, on 3 March 1961 to Eric and Elda (Moore) Southern, and distinguished himself early as a King's Scholar at Eton College. He was a member of Balliol College, Oxford, and graduated with a B.A. in Classics from the University of Oxford in 1983. He worked for Bain Management Consultancy in London, England before pursuing his passion for language, learning and teaching at Princeton University in 1985. From 1986 to 1989, he attended Harvard University as an exchange scholar in linguistics. He earned his doctorate in Germanic Languages and Literatures from Princeton University in 1997. He married, converted to Judaism and had two daughters.

Before coming to Middlebury College in 2003, where he served as a visiting assistant professor of German and linguistics, Southern served as an assistant professor in the Department of Germanic Studies at the University of Texas, Austin (UT); as assistant professor of German and linguistics in the Department of Modern Languages at Carthage College in Kenosha, Wisconsin; and as a teaching fellow in arts and literature at Harvard University. While at the University of Texas, he held concurrent appointments at UT's Center for Middle Eastern Studies and Center for Asian Studies and held concurrent memberships in the Foreign Language Education Program, the Department of Asian Studies, and the Department of Middle Eastern Languages and Cultures.

At UT, he won the Jean Holloway Award for Excellence in Teaching and was selected as fellow to the Wakonse-South Conference on College Teaching.

On 15 March 2006, at age 45, he died at his home in Middlebury, Vermont.

== Selected works ==
- Southern, Mark R. V. Contagious Couplings Transmission of Expressives in Yiddish Echo Phrases. Westport, Conn: Praeger, 2005. ISBN 0-275-98087-1 According to WorldCat, the book is held in 640 libraries
- Southern, Mark R. V. Sub-Grammatical Survival: Indo-European S-Mobile and Its Regeneration in Germanic. Washington, D.C.: Institute for the Study of Man, 1999. ISBN 0-941694-72-0
- Southern, Mark R. V. Indo-European Perspectives. Journal of Indo-European studies., Monograph, no. 43. Washington, D.C.: Institute for the Study of Man, 2002.

His History of the German Language is under consideration at Cambridge University Press. He also published widely in scholarly journals and gave papers at numerous conferences.
