= Jim Hoffstetter =

Luxembourgish footballer (1937–2006)

Personal information
- Full name: Jean-Pierre Hoffstetter
- Date of birth: 27 October 1937
- Date of death: 10 March 2006 (aged 68)
- Position: Defender

Senior career*
Years	Team	Apps	(Gls)
- Aris Bonnevoie

International career
1960–1967	Luxembourg	39	(0)
- * Club domestic league appearances and goals

Jean-Pierre Hoffstetter "Jim" Hoffstetter (27 October 1937 – 10 March 2006) was a Luxembourgish professional footballer who played as a defender for Aris Bonnevoie. He made 39 appearances for the Luxembourg national team from 1960 to 1967.
