= David Ndahura =

Ugandan rally driver and army major

Major David Ndahura
- Born: 1942; Bunyoro, Uganda Protectorate
- Died: March 28, 1970 (aged 28); Tiva Bridge, near Kitui, Kenya
- Cause of death: Drowning
- Education: Defence Services Staff College, India
- Military career
- Rank: Major
- Unit: Uganda Army
- Nationality: Uganda

Safari Rally career
- Car number: 74
- Championships: 0
- Wins: 0
- Podiums: 0

Major David Ndahura (1942 – 28 March 1970) was a Ugandan military officer, rally driver and member of the Bunyoro-Kitara royal family. On 28 March 1970, at the East African Safari Rally, he was swept away and drowned after his Ford Cortina was marooned on a flooded bridge near Kitui in the Kenya section of the rally.

== Early life and military career ==
David Ndahura was born in 1942 into the royal family of the Bunyoro-Kitara Kingdom in Western Uganda.

Ndahura pursued a career in the military, eventually becoming a Major in the Uganda Army. He was trained at the Defence Services Staff College in Wellington, India. He was discharged from the army by the government of President Milton Obote in 1970. Following his dismissal, he turned his focus to rally.

== Rally career ==
Ndahura made his debut in the 18th East African Safari Rally, held from 26 to 30 March 1970, which was to start and finish in Kampala, Uganda, for the first time. Ndahura entered the race as a privateer. He competed in the No. 74 Ford Cortina GT, and his co-driver was Jouis Agard.

=== Fatal accident ===
On 28 March 1970, 80 km from Nairobi, Ndahura reached the flooded Tiva Bridge near Kitui. Despite other drivers choosing to wait for the waters to recede, Ndahura attempted to drive over the bridge.

Nduhara's car became marooned in the water. He and Agard climbed onto the roof of the vehicle to wait for the water to recede, but a sudden surge in the river swept the car away. Agard managed to swim to safety, but Ndahura was carried away by the current and drowned.

== See also ==
- Bunyoro _Kitara Kingdom
- Milton Obote
- Motorsport in Uganda
