= Gary du Plessis =

Zimbabwean cricketer (1974–2006)

Personal information
- Born: 19 August 1974; Salisbury, Rhodesia
- Died: 25 March 2006 (aged 31); Harare, Zimbabwe
- Batting: Right-handed
- Bowling: Right-arm medium

Domestic team information
- Years: Team
- 1997/98: Mashonaland A
- 1999/2000: Mashonaland

Career statistics
Competition	FC	LA
Matches	4	1
Runs scored	31	7
Batting average	10.33	–
100s/50s	0/0	0/0
Top score	17	7*
Balls bowled	186	18
Wickets	2	0
Bowling average	57.50	–
5 wickets in innings	0	–
10 wickets in match	0	–
Best bowling	1/11	–
Catches/stumpings	5/–	0/–
- Source: ESPNcricinfo, 15 July 2021

Gary du Plessis (19 August 1974 – 25 March 2006) was a Zimbabwean cricketer. A right-handed batsman and right-arm medium-pace bowler, he played one first-class match for Mashonaland A in 1997 and three first-class matches for Mashonaland in 2000.

Born in Salisbury (now Harare), he was the brother of Dean du Plessis, a blind cricket commentator.
