= Charles M. Tanner =

American dramatist (1918–2006)

Charles M. Tanner (April 11, 1918 – March 11, 2006) was a screenwriter, playwright and founder and director of Covenant Players. Tanner turned away from his then passion – film production as a writer, producer and director in Hollywood, known for being a writer for Bonanza – to begin Covenant Players in 1963. Besides being chief executive officer, he wrote more than 3,500 plays for the company.

== Early life ==
Tanner was born in Salamanca, New York. He attended Salamanca High School.

In September 1940, during World War II, Tanner enlisted in the U.S. Air Corps. By 1942, he had been a captain. He served in the military from 1940 to 1946, during which he received the Bronze Star Medal and Purple Heart. From 1947 to 1950, Tanner worked as the Department of State Motion Picture Editor in Seoul, South Korea, and was awarded the Scroll by the Seoul City Cultural Association. From 1950 to 1952, Tanner was the United States Information Service (USIS)'s Motion Picture Officer and Media Director in Manila, Philippines. From 1952 to 1953, he was the Motion Picture Officer located in Tokyo, Japan. From 1953 to 1955, Tanner was the Hollywood liaison for the Committee for a Free Asia/the Asia Foundation in San Francisco, California.

== Covenant Players ==
Tanner founded nonprofit theater company Covenant Players in 1963. The company began with eight performers in Encino in 1963 and grew to an international organization touring globally in different languages. The company launched its international tour with performances in Canada in 1969. It then began to perform in Europe in 1971; Asia in 1972; Australia in 1973; Africa in 1981; and Latin America in 1985. Besides being the company's International Director, Tanner wrote over 3,500 plays. He was able to write more than 100 plays a year. He was also hands-on in training the performers, until he suffered a stroke in 1998. He continued to write plays even after the stroke.

The plays written by Tanner are modern morality stories based on New Testament themes. The tales tend to involve topics including drugs, family, schools, conflict resolution, and interpersonal relationships. Another major theme of the plays is war, because Tanner considered war to be "a proving ground of human character." Some of Tanner's plays teach virtue without including religious references, so they could be performed at public schools. one teaching concept for character analysis study in Tanner's teaching included looking at human character five elementally; Physical, Spiritual, Emotional, Psychological and Intellectual. Physical characteristics of our bodies including mechanical ability health etc. Why we do what we do is the Psychological element. Emotional is Feelings reactions. Intellectual is what we know/characters knowledge, Spiritual is the characters relationship with the spiritual realm
