= Ivano Corghi =

Italian footballer and manager (1922–2006)

Personal information
- Date of birth: 14 September 1922
- Place of birth: Correggio, Italy
- Date of death: 4 March 2006 (aged 83)
- Position: Goalkeeper

Senior career*
Years	Team	Apps	(Gls)
1940–1946	Palermo		
1946–1948	Modena		
1948–1959	Novara		

Managerial career
- 1959: Novara
- 1960: Modena
- 1961–1963: Piacenza
- 1965–1966: Parma
- 1963–1965: Carpi
- 1968: Frosinone
- 1969: Sangiovannese
- 1970–1971: Grosseto
- 1971: Carpi
- * Club domestic league appearances and goals

Ivano Corghi (14 September 1922 – 4 March 2006) was an Italian professional footballer and later manager.
