= Jörg Bastuck =

German rally co-driver

Personal information
- Nationality: (Germany) German
- Born: September 4, 1969; Dillingen, Saarland, Germany
- Died: March 24, 2006 (aged 36); Salou, Spain

World Rally Championship record
- Years active: 2006
- Driver: Aaron Burkart
- Teams: OMV Rally Team
- Rallies: 1
- Championships: 0
- Rally wins: 0
- Podiums: 0
- Stage wins: 0
- Total points: 0
- First rally: 2006 Rally Catalunya
- Last rally: 2006 Rally Catalunya
- Last updated on: 6 December 2025.

Jörg Bastuck (4 September 1969 in Dillingen, Saarland, Germany – 24 March 2006 in Salou, Spain) was a German co-driver in the Junior World Rally Championship. He was killed in an accident during the 2006 Rally of Catalunya.

== Career ==
Bastuck had originally competed in rallying as a driver, starting from 1991. He drove a variety of Volkswagen Golf rally cars in national events in Germany, such as the ADAC Rallye Nürburgring. His final race drive came in 1995, finishing 2nd in class at the Litermont Rallye with Lars Mysliwietz as his co-driver.

Bastuck's first appearance as a co-driver came in 1992, alongside Rudi Schulz in a Opel Corsa A GSi. He continued working with several German drivers through 1993 until 1995 in a variety of Opel rally cars at national events. Sporadic appearances continued until 1997. He returned as co-driver in 2001 to Mysliwietz, switching places from their last appearance together in 1995. Initially the pair raced a Seat Ibiza Cupra, later switching to a Honda Civic, racing together until the end of the 2004 German rallying season.

For 2005, Bastuck switched to racing alongside Florian Auer and the Mitsubishi team. Their best result came at the ADAC Ruperti Rallye, where the pair finished first in class and second overall. Bastuck and Auer teamed up for the 2006 ADAC Bayern Rallye Oberland in March.

The following week, Bastuck joined compatriot Aaron Burkart to compete in the 2006 Junior World Rally Championship round in Catalunya. The pair competed for the OMV Rally team in a Citroën C2 GT.

== Death ==
On the opening day of the 2006 Rally of Catalunya, Burkart crashed the pair's Citroën on the El Montmell stage, SS2. Their car slid off the track into a ditch. Bastuck left the vehicle to change a damaged tire on the C2 Super 1600. He was struck by the Ford Fiesta ST of Barry Clark (co-driven by Scott Martin), who crashed at exactly the same spot. Bastuck was left pinned between the two vehicles. He was airlifted from the course to the Joan XXIII Hospital in Tarragona, where he was pronounced dead. The other drivers, and co-driver Martin escaped without injury.

=== Tributes ===
The organisers confirmed via statement that celebrations at the end of the rally would be cancelled as a mark of respect. The Head of Sponsorship for OMV, Brigitte Muhlwisch said: "Jörg Bastuck's death is a tragic loss to all of us. Our thoughts and sympathies go to his family." Meanwhile, Luis Moya of the Subaru World Rally Team added, "We were deeply saddened to hear that Jörg Bastuck died of his injuries from the accident on SS2 and our thoughts and sympathies go out to his friends and family at this time".
