= Zimbabwe Domestic Twenty20 =

Zimbabwean professional twenty20 cricket league

Domestic Twenty20
- Countries: Zimbabwe
- Administrator: Zimbabwe Cricket
- Format: Twenty20
- First edition: 2006–07
- Latest edition: 2025–26
- Next edition: 2026–27
- Tournament format: Round-robin and final
- Number of teams: 6
- Current champion: Mid West Rhinos (2nd title)
- Most successful: Mashonaland Eagles (4 titles)

The Zimbabwean Domestic Twenty20, formerly known as the Stanbic Bank Twenty20 and the Metropolitan Bank Twenty20, is the domestic men's Twenty20 cricket competition in Zimbabwe. It was first played in 2006–07 and is organised by Zimbabwe Cricket.

The profile of the tournament grew after the reorganisation of cricket in Zimbabwe ahead of the 2009–10 season.

== History ==
A domestic Twenty20 cricket tournament was first contested in the 2006–07 Metropolitan Bank Twenty20 competition. The tournament has previously been known as the Metropolitan Bank Twenty20, the Stanbic Bank Twenty20, and the Domestic Twenty20 Competition.

== Teams ==
Current teams
Team	City	Home ground(s)
Mountaineers	Mutare, Manicaland	Mutare Sports Club
Mashonaland Eagles	Harare, Mashonaland	Harare Sports Club
Mid West Rhinos	Kwekwe, Midlands	Kwekwe Sports Club
Matabeleland Tuskers	Bulawayo, Matabeleland	Queens Sports Club
Southern Rocks	Masvingo	Masvingo Sports Club

=== Former teams ===
- Northerns
- Easterns
- Southerns
- Westerns
- Centrals
- Durham

== Tournament results ==
Season	Winners	Runners-up	Teams
2006–07 (Note: Scorecards were never made available for this tournament.)	Southerns	Easterns	5
2007–08	Easterns	Westerns	5
2008–09	Westerns	Northerns	4
2009–10	Mountaineers	Mashonaland Eagles	6
2010–11	Mashonaland Eagles	Mid West Rhinos	5
2011–12	Mountaineers	Mashonaland Eagles	5
2012–13	Mountaineers	Mashonaland Eagles	5
2013–14	Cancelled		
2014–15	Not held		
2015–16	Mashonaland Eagles	Mountaineers	4
2016–17	Not held		
2017–18	Not held		
2018–19	Matabeleland Tuskers	Mountaineers	4
2020–21	Matabeleland Tuskers	Mashonaland Eagles	5
2021–22	Mashonaland Eagles	Mountaineers	5
2022–23	Mashonaland Eagles	Mid West Rhinos	6
2024	Durham	Mashonaland Eagles	6
2025	Mid West Rhinos	Mashonaland Eagles	5
2025–26	Mid West Rhinos	Mashonaland Eagles	5

== Tournament history ==
=== 2006–07 season ===
- Winner: Southerns
- Runner-up: Easterns
- Dates: 30 March 2007 – 1 April 2007

The tournament took place in Mutare.

=== 2007–08 season ===
- Winner: Easterns
- Runner-up: Westerns
- Dates: 19 March 2008 – 21 March 2008
- Official Website: Metropolitan Bank Twenty20 2007/08 at ESPNCricinfo
- Main Article: 2007–08 Metropolitan Bank Twenty20

The 2008 season was held between 19 and 21 March 2008.

Hamilton Masakadza was named the Man of the Match and the Man of the Tournament.

After the tournament, Steven Price wrote on Cricinfo from Harare that the poor standards of cricket had blighted Zimbabwe's Twenty20 domestic competition.

=== 2008–09 season ===
- Champions: Westerns
- Runners-up: Northerns
- Dates: 13 May 2009 – 16 May 2009
- Official Website: Metropolitan Bank Twenty20 2009 on ESPNCricinfo

In the final, Western's victory was largely possible due to the efforts of spinner Mbekezeli Mabuza who took enthralling figures of 5/14. After Westerns had been bowled out for 116 mostly by Trevor Garwe (who was also the leading wicket-taker in this tournament) who took 4–23, Mbekezeli, along with Njabulo Ncube (who provided the key strike) dismantled the Northerns batting line-up to bring victory to their team by four runs.

=== 2009–10 season ===
- Winner: Mountaineers
- Runners-up: Mashonaland Eagles
- Official Website: 2009/10 Stanbic Bank 20 Series on ESPNCricinfo
- Main Article: 2009–10 Stanbic Bank 20 Series

The tournament was renamed as the Stanbic Bank 20 Series. Stanbic Bank (Uganda) Limited was the new sponsors. This was after the reorganization of Zimbabwean cricket and as a result, new franchises started taking part in the competition. They are Mashonaland Eagles (formerly Northerns), Southern Rocks (formerly Southerns), Mountaineers (formerly Easterns), Matabeleland Tuskers (formerly Westerns), and Mid West Rhinos (formerly Centrals). In addition, the Desert Vipers also participated as a sixth team. Craig Williams captained the team.

Mountaineers was easily the strongest team in the tournament final, but they were quite shaky in the group stage. Among the 5 matches they played, they won 3 and lost 2. Stronger than them was Mashonaland Eagles, who had finished first in the pool. Particularly effective against them was Eagle's bowler Ray Price who downed them by 82 runs at Harare taking remarkable figures of 5/12 in just 17 deliveries finishing off the game by the stumping of Natsai Mushangwe.

Mountaineers, however, brought their "A" game to the final. They put their disaster of the previous morning by beating their heavily favored opponents by a massive nine wickets. After bowling out their vaunted opponents for just 105 with Greg Smith taking 3/11 and Prosper Utseya 3/24, they cruised to the target as renowned internationals and former schoolmates Hamilton Masakadza (64*) and Tatenda Taibu (37*) took their team to the inaugural Stanbic Bank 20 Series title.

Despite all this, perhaps the most mind-blowing was Desert Vipers's performance. Coming into the tournament from the minnow cricketing nation of Namibia, nobody had much expectations on Namibia. However, they exceeded all expectations to finish third first in the group stage, then defeating the much more vaunted Matabeleland Tuskers (who won the tournament just a season back in 2008–09 as Westerns) by 31 runs. After the Vipers were restricted to 126/7 (despite Raymond van Schoor scoring 46), with Christopher Mpofu taking 2/26, Tuskers were bowled out for 91 (Tawanda Mupariwa's 31 proved to be the highest score of the innings), with Louis Klazinga taking 2/13 and Dirk Viljoen 2/14.

There was also another record set during the final. The final at Harare Sports Club between the Mountaineers and Eagles attracted an audience of 7500, which is the biggest attendance ever for a domestic match in living memory. As a result, Zimbabwe Cricket officially expressed its delight at the record turn-outs.

A number of former players and overseas players were contracted by the franchises specifically for the tournament. Anthony Ireland and Ian Harvey appeared for the Southern Rocks, Dougie Marillier for Mash Eagles, Andy Blignaut for Matabeleland Tuskers, Greg Smith for the Mountaineers and Darren Stevens and Ollie Rayner for Kwekwe's MidWest Rhinos. So successful was this edition that a second edition was staged in November that same year.

=== 2010–11 season ===
- Champions: Mashonaland Eagles
- Runners-up: Mid West Rhinos
- Official Website: 2010/11 Stanbic Bank 20 Series at ESPNCricinfo
- Main Article: 2010–11 Stanbic Bank 20 Series

The tournament was staged in November 2010 following the success of the previous tournament in February. This edition of the tournament started with a bang. In a bid to win the tournament, Southern Rocks signed both former West Indian legend Brian Lara (who holds the record for the highest ever Test cricket score of 400*), and a former English deadly fast bowler named Ryan Sidebottom. This not only raised the standard of cricket played in the tournament, but increased its profile to the rest of the cricketing world. A number of other players were also attracted in the tournament, for example, Netherlands and Essex all-rounder Ryan ten Doeschate, Nick Compton, Liam Dawson, Andrew Hall, Paul Horton, and Lou Vincent. Grant Flower also made his comeback to playing competitive matches in Zimbabwe, as captain of Mashonaland Eagles.

Lara's presence was immense, and he scored a half-century on his Twenty20 debut, top-scoring with 65 for the Rocks and then scored a further 34 runs from 2 innings before he left, citing "commitments elsewhere". The Rocks eventually finished third due to brilliant performances by their young opener Sikandar Raza, who was turning into a T20 specialist. Eventual champions Mashonaland Eagles was the strongest by finishing at the top of the pool. The previous year's champions, Mountaineers finished bottom of the lot, thus getting out of contention for the title.

In the 1st Semi-Final, eventual champions Eagles held their nerves to secure a place in the Stanbic Bank 20 Final. After bowling out opponents Matabeleland Tuskers for 70, they themselves were in a position of being bowled out for lower than that, as the last-wicket pair of Ray Price and Douglas Hondo coming in with six still required, and hit the winning runs.

In the third-place playoff, the Tuskers defeated the Rocks by a massive nine-wickets with Charles Coventry leading the way with 67* off 40 balls, and shared a 126-run partnership with Paul Horton who scored a half-century (56*) of his own. Victory was achieved with 10 balls spare.

In the final between Mash Eagles and Mid West Rhinos, Eagles sneaked through a thrilling contest by 1 run to become the second Stanbic Bank 20 Series Champion. Captain Grant Flower although he did not contribute to the runs as he was on the non-strikers end when the 20 overs were completed, on 0 not out, he led his team admirably to the field. Andrew Hall showed his all-round value with a 17-ball 39, which brought about the total. When Lou Vincent and captain Vusi Sibanda was in control of the Rhinos's run-chase and the result seemingly sealed, the experienced Flower who had long county stints with Essex County Cricket Club brought his spinners, Greg Lamb and Ray Price, and that brought about immediate results. Rhinos collapsed into a 1-run defeat. A quality crowd had come to see the match, and they had got exhilarating cricket.

The tournament concluded with a notable moment in the final, when Grant Flower was given a guard of honour as he left the field during the innings break. Flower later described it as a fitting end to his career and reflected positively on the tournament, noting the high standard of cricket throughout.

=== 2011–12 season ===
- Champions: Mountaineers
- Runners-up: Mashonaland Eagles
- Official Website: Stanbic Bank 20 Series 2011/12
- Main Article: 2011–12 Stanbic Bank 20 Series

Zimbabwe Cricket was bullish ahead of the tournament, with ZC managing director Ozias Bvute saying "We will be very close to breaking even this year and we are not too far from making it a sustainable and profitable tournament."

Mountaineers were crowned as the new champions, and with two titles became the most successful team in the history of the competition. International players Ryan ten Doeschate, Lou Vincent, Paul Horton, Liam Dawson and Andrew Hall were retained from the previous season. International players Chris Gayle (Matabeleland Tuskers), Dirk Nannes (Mountaineers), and Australian fast bowler Shaun Tait (Mid West Rhinos) were all signed for the tournament as well as other overseas players such as Peter Trego, Rory Hamilton-Brown, and Phil Mustard, with a total of 16 foreign players participating in the tournament.

The tournament kicked off on 25 November 2011 and saw both Njabulo Ncube and Natsai Mushangwe star as Mountaineers and Matabeleland Tuskers defeated Mid West Rhinos and Mashonaland Eagles respectively.

At the halfway stage, it seemed that Tuskers were the most dominant team and their strong team consisting international players unbalancing the tournament. However, the tournament changed when Mid West Rhinos defeated Matabeleland Tuskers, despite Chris Gayle scoring a rapid-fire century for the Tuskers. The Rhinos built on Brendan Taylor's unbeaten innings of 75 as they won by seven wickets. Southern Rocks had a forgettable tournament, finishing bottom of the pool, and thus not proceeding to the next stage. Mashonaland Eagles staged a comeback after losing all their initial matches they made it through to the playoff final by defeating Mid West Rhinos by 53 runs, against Matabeleland Tuskers. There they defeated the Tuskers by 23 runs (Duckworth–Lewis method) despite Chris Gayle's half-century, and another by Steven Trenchard, as they already had compiled a massive 207/7 thanks to Ryan ten Doeschate's 121* of 58.

Matabeleland had been consigned to the playoff final after they were earlier defeated by eventual champions Mountaineers at the 1st Semi. That was made possible by captain Hamilton Masakadza's 80*.

In the tournament final, the bowlers led Mountaineers to a remarkable victory. After Eagles restricted them to 142/6 (Phil Mustard 56), it seemed that Eagles would win the game (considering that they scored 207 in their playoff final match against the Tuskers), but Shingirai Masakadza took 3/21 in a remarkable spell to see out the Eagles for just 115 and secure victory by 27 runs. He received support from former captain Prosper Utseya, former New Zealand all-rounder Chris Harris, and international star Dirk Nannes.

=== 2012–13 season ===
- Champions: Mountaineers
- Runners-up: Mashonaland Eagles
- Official Website: Stanbic Bank 20 Series 2012/13

For the 2012–13 season, ZC has announced that in addition to the five local franchises, an additional four school teams will take part, which will add to the rivalry and competition. The two primary schools will be Ruwazi Primary School will face off against fellow opponents, Chipembere Primary School, while the two high schools will be Churchill High School and St. Georges. It will be a historic occasion as for the first time, youngsters can take center stage at a national event in the country and in a tournament which witnessed a record turnout in the final of the 2009–10 Stanbic Bank 20 Series. ZC announced this in a media release.

=== 2013–14 to 2014-15 ===
2013–14 to 2014-15 Season Not Held Not Play

=== 2017–18 season ===
For the 2017–18 season, The competition was scheduled to start in April 2018 and would have included a new team, the Rising Stars, along with the existing four teams. Two foreign teams were also expected to be included in the competition. Originally the T20 tournament was scheduled to open the Zimbabwean 2017–18 domestic calendar in September 2017, but it was moved back to April as it clashed with other T20 competitions being held.

=== 2018-19 Season ===
- Winners:Matabeleland Tuskers
- Runner up:Mountaineers
- 2018–19 Stanbic Bank 20 Series Official website at ESPN cricinfo

2018–19 Stanbic Bank 20 Series was the eighth edition of the Stanbic Bank 20 Series, a Twenty20 cricket tournament in Zimbabwe. It took place from 11 to 17 March 2019.

The final finished as a no result due to rain, so Matabeleland Tuskers were declared the winners, after finishing highest in the group stage of the tournament.

=== 2020-21 Season ===
- Winners:Tuskers
- Runner up:
- Official website: 2020–21 Zimbabwe Domestic Twenty20 Competition at ESPN Cricinfo

The 2020–21 Zimbabwe Domestic Twenty20 Competition was a 10th Season Twenty20 cricket tournament that was played in Zimbabwe during April 2021. Five teams took part in the competition,

Following the conclusion of the group stage, Tuskers and Eagles qualified for the final of the tournament.Rocks beat Mountaineers to win the 3rd place play-off match, and in the final, Tuskers beat Eagles by 69 runs to win the tournament.

=== 2023-24 Season ===
The 2023-24 Zimbabwe Domestic Twenty20 Competition was the 13th Season of the Domestic competition. The five domestic franchise teams took part as well as English Side Durham County Cricket Club, was the 6th team in the league as part of their pre-season training. Durham won the championship and after continuing their unbeaten streak into the final, clinching victory by a margin of 213 runs after dismissing the Mashonaland Eagles for a mere 16 runs.
