= 2007 World Twenty20 squads =

This page lists the squads picked for the 2007 ICC World Twenty20. This was the first World Twenty20 tournament which was organised by the ICC. The tournament was held from 11 to 24 September 2007 in South Africa. 12 teams participated in the tournament, and the teams were sorted by their groups in the preliminary group stage. The first-class team listed for each player is the domestic team he played for in his home country and any English county he has played for in the 2007 season, which was running concurrently to the World Twenty20 tournament.

== Group A ==
=== Bangladesh ===
Bangladesh announced their squad on 9 August 2007.

No.	Player	Date of birth	T20s	Batting	Bowling style	First class team
98	Mohammad Ashraful (c)	9 September 1984	2	Right	Right arm leg break	(Bangladesh) Dhaka Division
2	Mashrafe Mortaza (vc)	5 October 1983	3	Right	Right arm fast medium	(Bangladesh) Khulna Division
41	Abdur Razzak	15 June 1982	3	Right	Slow left arm orthodox	(Bangladesh) Khulna Division
97	Aftab Ahmed	10 November 1985	3	Right	Right-arm medium	(Bangladesh) Chittagong Division
14	Alok Kapali	1 January 1984	2	Right	Right arm leg break	(Bangladesh) Sylhet Division
76	Farhad Reza	16 June 1986	3	Right	Right-arm fast medium	(Bangladesh) Rajshahi Division
31	Junaid Siddique	30 October 1987	0	Left	Right arm off break	(Bangladesh) Rajshahi Division
30	Mohammad Mahmudullah	4 February 1986	2	Right	Right arm off break	(Bangladesh) Dhaka Division
15	Mushfiqur Rahim	1 September 1988	3	Right	Wicket-keeper	(Bangladesh) Rajshahi Division
83	Nadif Chowdhury	21 April 1987	1	Right	Slow left arm orthodox	(Bangladesh) Barisal Division
40	Nazimuddin	1 October 1985	2	Right		(Bangladesh) Chittagong Division
75	Shakib Al Hasan	24 March 1987	1	Left	Slow left arm orthodox	(Bangladesh) Khulna Division
47	Syed Rasel	3 July 1984	2	Left	Left-arm medium fast	(Bangladesh) Khulna Division
29	Tamim Iqbal	20 March 1989	2	Left		(Bangladesh) Chittagong Division
50	Ziaur Rahman	2 December 1986	0	Right	Right-arm fast medium	(Bangladesh) Khulna Division

=== South Africa ===
South Africa announced their squad on 11 August 2007. Loots Bosman was ruled out of the competition with a lower back injury.

No.	Player	Date of birth	T20s	Batting	Bowling style	First class team
15	Graeme Smith (c)	1 February 1981	5	Left	Right arm off break	(South Africa) Cape Cobras
9	Mark Boucher	3 December 1976	2	Right	Wicket-keeper	(South Africa) Cape Cobras
17	AB de Villiers	17 February 1984	3	Right	Right-arm medium	(South Africa) Nashua Titans
7	Shaun Pollock	16 July 1973	4	Right	Right-arm fast medium	(South Africa) Nashua Dolphins
16	Makhaya Ntini	6 July 1977	2	Right	Right-arm fast	(South Africa) Fidentia Warriors
89	Andre Nel	15 July 1977	1	Right	Right-arm fast medium	(South Africa) Nashua Titans
0	Thandi Tshabalala	19 November 1984	0	Right	Right arm off break	(South Africa) Gestetner Diamond-Eagles
65	Morne Morkel	6 October 1984	0	Left	Right-arm fast	(South Africa) Nashua Titans
81	Albie Morkel	10 June 1981	0	Left	Right-arm medium fast	(South Africa) Nashua Titans
6	Justin Kemp	2 October 1977	3	Right	Right-arm fast medium	(South Africa) Cape Cobras (England) Kent Spitfires
29	Johan van der Wath	10 January 1978	3	Right	Right-arm medium fast	(South Africa) Gestetner Diamond-Eagles (England) Northamptonshire Steelbacks
24	Vernon Philander	24 June 1985	0	Right	Right-arm fast medium	(South Africa) Cape Cobras
07	Herschelle Gibbs	23 February 1974	4	Right		(South Africa) Cape Cobras
21	Jean-Paul Duminy	14 April 1984	0	Left	Right arm off break	(South Africa) Cape Cobras
69	Gulam Bodi	4 January 1979	0	Left	Slow left-arm wrist-spin	(South Africa) Nashua Titans

=== West Indies ===
No.	Player	Date of birth	T20s	Batting	Bowling style	First class team
53	Ramnaresh Sarwan	23 June 1980	0	Right	Right arm leg break	Guyana
47	Dwayne Bravo	7 October 1983	3	Right	Right-arm medium fast	Trinidad and Tobago
6	Shivnarine Chanderpaul	18 August 1974	2	Left	Right arm leg break	Guyana (England) Durham Dynamos
17	Pedro Collins	12 August 1976	0	Right	Left-arm fast medium	Barbados
66	Narsingh Deonarine	16 August 1983	0	Left	Right arm off break	Guyana
20	Fidel Edwards	6 February 1982	0	Right	Right-arm fast	Barbados
45	Chris Gayle	21 September 1979	3	Left	Right arm off break	Jamaica
37	Runako Morton	22 July 1978	3	Right	Right-arm medium or off break	Leeward Islands
39	Daren Powell	15 April 1978	2	Right	Right-arm fast medium	Jamaica (England) Hampshire Hawks
80	Denesh Ramdin	13 March 1985	3	Right	Wicket-keeper	Trinidad and Tobago
14	Ravi Rampaul	15 October 1984	2	Left	Right-arm fast medium	Trinidad and Tobago
88	Darren Sammy	20 December 1983	2	Right	Right-arm fast medium	Windward Islands
52	Marlon Samuels	5 February 1981	2	Right	Right arm off break	Jamaica
28	Devon Smith	21 October 1981	1	Left	Right arm off break	Windward Islands
50	Dwayne Smith	12 April 1983	3	Right	Right-arm medium	Barbados

== Group B ==
=== Australia ===
Australia's T20 squad was announced on 20 July 2007. Shaun Tait was named in the original squad but was later ruled out after elbow surgery; he was replaced by Ben Hilfenhaus. The squad was generally the same as that which won the ICC Cricket World Cup earlier in the year.

No.	Player	Date of birth	T20s	Batting	Bowling style	First class team
14	Ricky Ponting (c)	19 December 1974	5	Right	Right arm medium	(Australia) Tasmanian Tigers
18	Adam Gilchrist (vc)	14 November 1971	4	Left	Wicket-keeper	(Australia) Western Warriors
59	Nathan Bracken	12 September 1977	3	Right	Left arm fast medium	(Australia) New South Wales Blues
8	Stuart Clark	28 September 1975	2	Right	Right arm fast medium	(Australia) New South Wales Blues (England) Hampshire County Cricket Club
23	Michael Clarke	2 April 1981	5	Right	Slow left arm orthodox	(Australia) New South Wales Blues
57	Brad Haddin	23 October 1977	1	Right	Wicket-keeper	(Australia) New South Wales Blues
28	Matthew Hayden	29 October 1971	2	Left	Right arm medium	(Australia) Queensland Bulls
29	Ben Hilfenhaus	15 March 1983	1	Right	Right arm fast medium	(Australia) Tasmanian Tigers
17	Brad Hodge	29 December 1974	0	Right	Right arm off break	(Australia) Victorian Bushrangers (England) Lancashire Lightning
31	Brad Hogg	6 February 1971	2	Left	Slow left-arm wrist-spin	(Australia) Western Warriors
48	Michael Hussey	27 May 1975	4	Left	Right arm medium	(Australia) Western Warriors
25	Mitchell Johnson	2 November 1981	0	Left	Left arm fast	(Australia) Queensland Bulls
58	Brett Lee	8 November 1976	3	Right	Right arm fast	(Australia) New South Wales Blues
63	Andrew Symonds	9 June 1975	4	Right	Right arm off break Right arm medium	(Australia) Queensland Bulls
33	Shane Watson	17 June 1981	1	Right	Right arm fast medium	(Australia) Queensland Bulls

=== England ===
England announced their squad on 6 August 2007. Ravi Bopara pulled out from the tournament on 4 September, after dislocating his thumb during a bowling spell in the ODI series against India. Three days later, James Anderson was announced to replace him. Ryan Sidebottom also withdrew after failing to recover from a side injury sustained during the third Test against India in early August: Dimitri Mascarenhas was called up as his replacement.

No.	Player	Date of birth	T20s	Batting	Bowling style	First class team
5	Paul Collingwood (c)	26 May 1976	6	Right	Right-arm medium	(England) Durham Dynamos
9	James Anderson	30 July 1982	3	Left	Right-arm fast medium	(England) Lancashire Lightning
39	Stuart Broad	24 June 1986	3	Left	Right-arm fast medium	(England) Leicestershire Foxes
11	Andrew Flintoff	6 December 1977	2	Right	Right-arm fast	(England) Lancashire Lightning
16	James Kirtley	10 January 1975	0	Right	Right-arm fast medium	(England) Sussex Sharks
6	Darren Maddy	23 May 1974	0	Right	Right-arm medium	(England) Warwickshire Bears
32	Dimitri Mascarenhas	30 October 1977	2	Right	Right-arm fast medium	(England) Hampshire Hawks
24	Kevin Pietersen	27 June 1980	6	Right	Right arm off break	(England) Hampshire Hawks
13	Matt Prior	26 February 1982	2	Right	Wicket-keeper	(England) Sussex Sharks
28	Chris Schofield	6 October 1978	0	Left	Right arm leg break	(England) Surrey Brown Caps
3	Owais Shah	22 October 1978	2	Right	Right arm off break	(England) Middlesex Crusaders
29	Jeremy Snape	27 April 1973	0	Right	Right arm off break	(England) Leicestershire Foxes
38	Vikram Solanki	1 April 1976	1	Right	Right arm off break	(England) Worcestershire Royals
33	Chris Tremlett	2 September 1981	0	Right	Right-arm medium fast	(England) Hampshire Hawks
45	Luke Wright	7 March 1985	0	Right	Right-arm medium	(England) Sussex Sharks

=== Zimbabwe ===
Zimbabwe announced their squad on 14 August 2007. Tatenda Taibu returned to the team for the first time in two years.

No.	Player	Date of birth	T20s	Batting	Bowling style	First class team
52	Prosper Utseya (c)	26 March 1985	1	Right	Right arm off break	(Zimbabwe) Easterns
12	Gary Brent	13 January 1976	1	Right	Right-arm medium fast	(Zimbabwe) Southerns
33	Justice Chibhabha	6 September 1986	1	Right	Right-arm medium	(Zimbabwe) Southerns
47	Elton Chigumbura	14 March 1986	1	Right	Right-arm medium	(Zimbabwe) Northerns
17	Keith Dabengwa	17 August 1980	1	Left	Slow left arm orthodox	(Zimbabwe) Westerns
65	Timycen Maruma	19 April 1988	0	Right	Right arm leg break	(Zimbabwe) Easterns
58	Johnson Marumisa	1 March 1983	0	Right	Right arm leg break	(Zimbabwe) Easterns
3	Hamilton Masakadza	9 August 1983	1	Right	Right arm leg break	(Zimbabwe) Easterns
45	Stuart Matsikenyeri	3 May 1983	1	Right	Right arm off break	(Zimbabwe) Easterns
28	Christopher Mpofu	27 November 1985	0	Right	Right-arm medium	(Zimbabwe) Westerns
53	Tawanda Mupariwa	16 April 1985	0	Right	Right-arm fast medium	(Zimbabwe) Westerns
26	Vusi Sibanda	10 October 1983	0	Right	Right-arm medium	(Zimbabwe) Midlands
44	Tatenda Taibu	14 May 1983	0	Right	Wicket-keeper	(Zimbabwe) Mashonaland
1	Brendan Taylor	6 February 1986	1	Right	Wicket-keeper	(Zimbabwe) Mashonaland
14	Sean Williams	26 September 1986	1	Left	Slow left arm orthodox	(Zimbabwe) Westerns

== Group C ==
=== Kenya ===
Kenya announced their squad on 14 August 2007.

No.	Player	Date of birth	T20s	Batting	Bowling style	Domestic team
5	Steve Tikolo (c)	25 June 1971	1	Right	Right-arm medium	(Kenya) Swamibapa
07	Rajesh Bhudia	22 November 1984	2	Right	Right-arm medium	(Kenya) Kanbis
11	Jimmy Kamande	12 December 1978	1	Right	Right arm off break	(Kenya) Parklands
89	Tanmay Mishra	22 December 1986	2	Right	Right-arm fast medium	(Kenya) Aga Khan
91	Alex Obanda	25 December 1987	1	Right	Right-arm medium fast	(Kenya) Swamibapa
13	Collins Obuya	27 July 1981	2	Right	Right arm leg break	(Kenya) Stray Lions
21	David Obuya	14 August 1979	2	Right	Wicket-keeper	(Kenya) Stray Lions
35	Nehemiah Odhiambo	7 August 1983	0	Right	Right-arm medium fast	(Kenya) Swamibapa
00	Thomas Odoyo	12 May 1978	2	Right	Right-arm medium fast	(Kenya) Kanbis
77	Peter Ongondo	10 February 1977	2	Right	Right-arm medium	(Kenya) Swamibapa
75	Lameck Onyango	22 September 1973	2	Right	Right-arm medium	(Kenya) Swamibapa
	Elijah Otieno	3 January 1988	0	Right	Right-arm medium fast	(Kenya) Swamibapa
17	Morris Ouma	8 November 1982	0	Right	Wicket-keeper	(Kenya) Swamibapa
09	Tony Suji	5 February 1976	1	Right	Right-arm medium	(Kenya) Swamibapa
84	Hiren Varaiya	9 April 1984	2	Right	Slow left arm orthodox	(Kenya) Nairobi Gymkhana

=== New Zealand ===
New Zealand announced their squad on 9 August 2007. Long-time captain Stephen Fleming, who stepped down from the One-day International captaincy after the 2007 World Cup, was not included, and Daniel Vettori was given the captaincy. Scott Styris could be replaced, as he has struggled with injury problems playing for Durham in England in 2007.

No.	Player	Date of birth	T20s	Batting	Bowling style	First class team
11	Daniel Vettori (c)	27 January 1979	0	Left	Slow left arm orthodox	(New Zealand) Northern Districts Knights
27	Shane Bond	7 June 1975	3	Right	Right-arm fast	(New Zealand) Canterbury Wizards
50	Peter Fulton	1 February 1979	2	Right	Right-arm medium	(New Zealand) Canterbury Wizards
17	Mark Gillespie	17 October 1979	2	Right	Right-arm fast medium	(New Zealand) Wellington Firebirds
	Gareth Hopkins	24 November 1976	0	Right	Wicket-keeper	(New Zealand) Otago Volts
42	Brendon McCullum	27 September 1981	5	Right	Wicket-keeper	(New Zealand) Canterbury Wizards
	Nathan McCullum	1 September 1980	0	Right	Right arm off break	(New Zealand) Otago Volts
10	Craig McMillan	13 September 1976	2	Right	Right-arm medium	(New Zealand) Canterbury Wizards
32	Chris Martin	10 December 1979	0	Right	Right-arm fast medium	(New Zealand) Auckland Aces
24	Jacob Oram	28 July 1978	1	Left	Right-arm medium	(New Zealand) Central Districts Stags
39	Jeetan Patel	7 May 1980	4	Right	Right arm off break	(New Zealand) Wellington Firebirds
	Bradley Scott	16 September 1979	0	Left	Left-arm fast medium	(New Zealand) Otago Volts
56	Scott Styris	10 July 1975	3	Right	Right-arm medium	(New Zealand) Auckland Aces (England) Durham Dynamos
3	Ross Taylor	8 March 1984	2	Right	Right arm off break	(New Zealand) Central Districts Stags
40	Lou Vincent	11 November 1978	1	Right	Right-arm medium	(New Zealand) Auckland Aces

=== Sri Lanka ===
Muttiah Muralitharan was originally selected in the squad, but was withdrawn on 31 August 2007 after straining a biceps. Dilruwan Perera replaced him.

No.	Player	Date of birth	T20s	Batting	Bowling style	First class team
27	Mahela Jayawardene (c)	27 May 1977	3	Right	Right-arm medium	(Sri Lanka) Sinhalese SC
18	Tillakaratne Dilshan	14 October 1976	2	Right	Right arm off break	(Sri Lanka) Bloomfield C&AC
26	Dilhara Fernando	19 July 1979	3	Right	Right-arm fast medium	(Sri Lanka) Sinhalese SC
	Hasantha Fernando	14 October 1979	0	Right	Right-arm medium	(Sri Lanka) Chilaw Marians CC
07	Sanath Jayasuriya	30 June 1969	2	Left	Slow left arm orthodox	(Sri Lanka) Bloomfield C&AC (England) Lancashire Lightning
77	Kaushal Lokuarachchi	20 May 1982	0	Right	Right arm leg break	(Sri Lanka) Sinhalese SC
28	Farveez Maharoof	7 September 1984	2	Right	Right-arm fast medium	(Sri Lanka) Bloomfield C&AC
99	Lasith Malinga	4 September 1983	2	Right	Right-arm fast	(Sri Lanka) Nondescripts CC (England) Kent Spitfires
42	Jehan Mubarak	10 January 1981	0	Left	Right arm off break	(Sri Lanka) Colombo CC
	Dilruwan Perera	22 July 1982	0	Right	Right arm off break	(Sri Lanka) Panadura CC
11	Kumar Sangakkara	27 October 1977	3	Left	Wicket-keeper	(Sri Lanka) Nondescripts CC (England) Warwickshire Bears
05	Chamara Silva	14 December 1979	2	Right	Right arm leg break	(Sri Lanka) Sebastianites C&AC
14	Upul Tharanga	2 February 1985	3	Left		(Sri Lanka) Nondescripts CC
22	Chaminda Vaas	27 January 1974	1	Left	Left-arm fast medium	(Sri Lanka) Colts CC (England) Middlesex Crusaders
47	Gayan Wijekoon	21 December 1976	0	Left	Left-arm medium	(Sri Lanka) Chilaw Marians CC

== Group D ==
=== India ===
India's squad was announced on 8 August 2007 after the veterans such as Sachin Tendulkar, Sourav Ganguly and Rahul Dravid voluntarily opted not to participate in this world cup.

No.	Player	Date of birth	T20's	Batting	Bowling style	First class team(s)
7	Mahendra Singh Dhoni (c)	7 July 1981	1	Right	Wicket-keeper	(India) Jharkhand
12	Yuvraj Singh (vc)	12 December 1981	0	Left	Left-arm orthodox spin	(India) Punjab
-	Virender Sehwag	20 October 1978	6	Right	Right arm off break	(India) Delhi
68	Ajit Agarkar	4 December 1977	1	Right	Right-arm fast medium	(India) Mumbai
5	Gautam Gambhir	14 October 1981	0	Left	Right arm leg break	(India) Delhi
35	Harbhajan Singh	3 July 1980	1	Right	Right arm off break	(India) Punjab
23	Joginder Sharma	23 October 1983	0	Right	Right-arm fast medium	(India) Haryana
1	Dinesh Karthik	1 June 1985	1	Right	Wicket-keeper	(India) Tamil Nadu
63	Irfan Pathan	27 October 1984	1	Left	Left-arm fast medium	(India) Baroda
27	Yusuf Pathan	17 November 1982	0	Right	Right arm off break	(India) Baroda
11	Piyush Chawla	24 December 1988	0	Left	Right arm leg break	(India) Uttar Pradesh
45	Rohit Sharma	30 April 1987	0	Right	Right arm off break	(India) Mumbai
9	R. P. Singh	6 December 1985	0	Right	Left-arm fast medium	(India) Uttar Pradesh
36	S. Sreesanth	6 February 1983	1	Right	Right-arm fast	(India) Kerala
77	Robin Uthappa	11 November 1985	0	Right	Right-arm medium	(India) Karnataka

=== Pakistan ===
After a dressing room incident on 6 September 2007, in which Shoaib Akhtar was alleged to have hit Mohammad Asif with a bat, Akhtar was handed an indefinite ban by the Pakistan Cricket Board and sent home from the tournament before it even began. Sohail Tanvir, an uncapped allrounder, replaced him. Misbah-ul-haq was a controversial selection ahead of Mohammed Yousuf. Yet Misbah ended up being the 2nd highest run scorer in the competition.

No.	Player	Date of birth	T20s	Batting	Bowling style	First class team(s)
18	Shoaib Malik (c)	1 February 1982	4	Right	Right arm off break	(Pakistan) PIA/Sialkot Stallions
36	Abdur Rehman	1 March 1980	2	Left	Slow left arm orthodox	(Pakistan) HBL/Sialkot Stallions
25	Fawad Alam	8 October 1985	1	Left	Slow left arm orthodox	(Pakistan) NBP/Karachi Dolphins
21	Iftikhar Anjum	1 December 1980	1	Right	Right-arm medium	(Pakistan) ZTBL/Islamabad Leopards
23	Kamran Akmal	13 January 1982	4	Right	Wicket-keeper	(Pakistan) NBP/Lahore Lions
22	Misbah-ul-Haq	28 May 1974	2	Right	Right arm leg break	(Pakistan) SNGPL/Faisalabad Wolves
26	Mohammad Asif	20 December 1982	2	Left	Right-arm fast medium	(Pakistan) NBP/Sialkot Stallions
88	Mohammad Hafeez	17 October 1980	3	Right	Right arm off break	(Pakistan) SNGPL/Faisalabad Wolves
1	Salman Butt	7 October 1984	2	Left	Right-arm off spin	(Pakistan) NBP/Lahore Eagles
10	Shahid Afridi	1 March 1980	3	Right	Right arm leg break	(Pakistan) HBL/Karachi Dolphins
33	Sohail Tanvir	12 December 1984	0	Left	Left-arm medium fast	(Pakistan) Attock/Rawalpindi Rams
55	Umar Gul	14 April 1984	1	Right	Right-arm fast medium	(Pakistan) HBL/Peshawar Panthers
27	Yasir Arafat	12 March 1982	1	Right	Right-arm medium	(Pakistan) KRL/Rawalpindi Rams (England) Sussex Sharks
75	Younis Khan	29 November 1977	4	Right	Right arm leg break	(Pakistan) HBL/Peshawar Panthers (England) Yorkshire Phoenix

=== Scotland ===
No.	Player	Date of birth	T20s	Batting	Bowling style	Domestic team
27	Ryan Watson (c)	12 November 1976	0	Right	Right-arm medium fast	(Scotland) Forfarshire
4	John Blain	4 January 1979	0	Left	Right-arm fast medium	(England) Rotherham Town
23	Dougie Brown	29 October 1969	0	Right	Right-arm fast medium	(England) Warwickshire Bears
24	Gordon Drummond	21 April 1980	0	Right	Right-arm medium fast	(Scotland) Watsonians
37	Gavin Hamilton	16 September 1974	0	Left	Right-arm medium fast	(England) East Brierley
10	Majid Haq	11 February 1983	0	Left	Right arm off break	(Scotland) Ferguslie
8	Ross Lyons	8 December 1984	0	Left	Slow left arm orthodox	(Scotland) Clydesdale
25	Neil McCallum	22 November 1977	0	Right		(Scotland) Grange
5	Gregor Maiden	22 July 1979	0	Right	Right arm off break	(Scotland) Grange
17	Dewald Nel	6 June 1980	0	Right	Right-arm medium fast	(Scotland) Greenock
28	Navdeep Poonia	11 May 1986	0	Right	Right-arm medium fast	(England) Warwickshire Bears
22	Qasim Sheikh	30 October 1984	0	Left	Left-arm medium	(Scotland) Clydesdale
55	Colin Smith	27 September 1972	0	Right	Wicket-keeper	(Scotland) Aberdeenshire
12	Fraser Watts	5 June 1979	0	Right		(Scotland) Greenock
99	Craig Wright	28 April 1974	0	Right	Right-arm medium	(Scotland) Greenock

== See also ==
- 2007 ICC World Twenty20
- 2007 ICC World Twenty20 officials
