= Cricket in Zimbabwe =

- Country: Zimbabwe
- National team: Zimbabwe

International competitions
- Cricket World Cup; ICC World Twenty20; ICC Champions Trophy; Women's Cricket World Cup; Under-19 Cricket World Cup

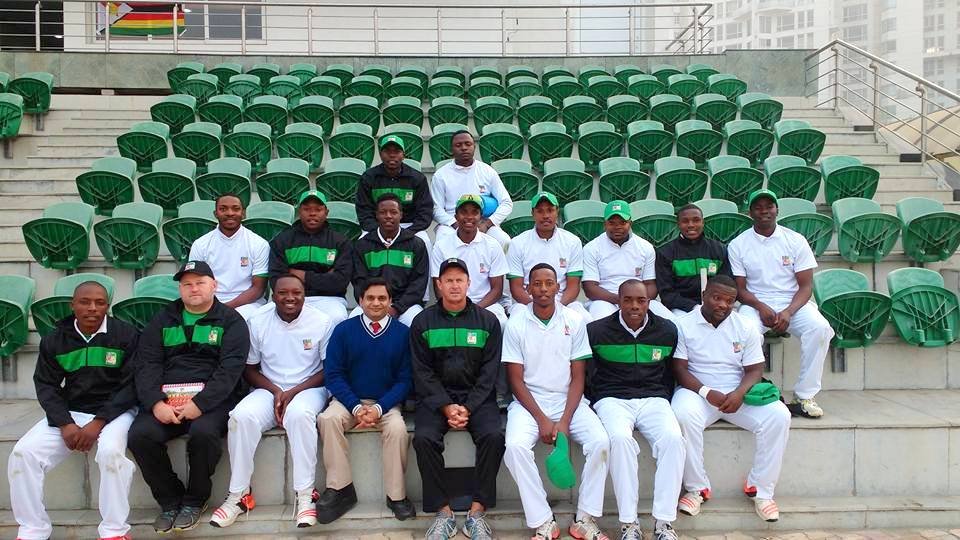
Zimbabwe cricket fans

Cricket is a popular sport in Zimbabwe. Zimbabwe Cricket (ZC) is a full member of the International Cricket Council (ICC).

== History ==
Cricket was introduced to Rhodesia in the 19th century and the Rhodesian Cricket Union was formed in 1898. Rhodesia participated in the Currie Cup, the South African inter-province competition in 1904/05 and then again from 1929/30 until 1979/80 as for cricketing purposes Rhodesia were under the authority of South Africa's administrators until independence in 1980. In May 1980, newly renamed Zimbabwe, the country severed its cricketing ties with South Africa and it became an Associate Member of the then "International Cricket Conference".

Zimbabwe became a full member of the ICC on 6 July 1992 and played its first Test match on 18–22 October the same year, against India at the Harare Sports Club in Harare. The match was drawn.

== Political issues ==
During the 2003 Cricket World Cup, the political situation in Zimbabwe came to the fore on the cricket field. Two Zimbabwean players, Andy Flower (white) and Henry Olonga (black), defied orders and wore black armbands during matches in protest against the "death of democracy in Zimbabwe" – a reference to their concern over the political actions of Zimbabwean President Robert Mugabe. Both players subsequently retired from cricket and emigrated from Zimbabwe. In 2004, Zimbabwe announced that test captain Heath Streak had resigned the captaincy and retired from cricket, but it soon became clear that Streak had been dismissed. His fellow white players submitted a list of demands to Zimbabwe Cricket, including the reinstatement of Streak and a review of the team selection process with a view to eliminating political and racial bias imposed by the Mugabe government. The ZC ignored the demands and fielded a team of inexperienced youths in two Tests and three One Day Internationals against the touring Sri Lankan side. The understrength Zimbabwe team was resoundingly defeated, resulting in calls from many players, ex-players, commentators, and fans for the ICC to strip the ZC of Test status until the internal crisis could be resolved. The matter reached a climax when ICC chief executive Malcolm Speed flew to Harare on 17 May to meet with ZC officials and discuss the crisis. The ZC refused to see him. Speed called an emergency meeting of the ICC Board to vote on the issue of Zimbabwe's suspension as a Test nation. On 21 May, with the vote just hours away, the ZC contacted Cricket Australia with an offer to cancel the two Test matches against Australia, due to begin the next day. Cricket Australia accepted the offer, thus averting the vote against the ZCU. On 10 June, representatives of the ZC, Cricket Australia, the United Cricket Board of South Africa, and the Board of Control for Cricket in India met and agreed that all remaining Test matches involving Zimbabwe for 2004 would be cancelled.

In November 2005, Tatenda Taibu the young captain of the Zimbabwe national team resigned citing the Current Situation in Zimbabwe Cricket as the main reason. In March 2007, ZC ordered national team members participating in the Cricket World Cup in to remove their dreadlocks. Two months later, after consulting the Australian cricket team, Australian Prime Minister John Howard declared his opposition to the political situation in Zimbabwe and the conduct of the Mugabe government by formally blocking the proposed Australian tour of Zimbabwe in September 2007.

== Governing body ==
Zimbabwe Cricket (ZC) (formerly known as the Zimbabwe Cricket Union) is the governing body for the sport of cricket in Zimbabwe. It is a full member of the International Cricket Council and African Cricket Association, and operates the Zimbabwean cricket team, organising Test tours and One Day Internationals with other nations. It also organises domestic cricket in Zimbabwe.

== Domestic competitions ==
- Logan Cup
- Pro50 Championship
- Zimbabwe Domestic Twenty20 Competition
- Zim Afro T10
- National Premier League Zimbabwe

== Teams ==
Zimbabwean domestic first-class cricket involved the following teams before the introduction of the franchise system in Zimbabwe Cricket:

- Centrals
- Northerns
- Southerns
- Westerns
- Easterns

The newly introduced five franchise sides are as follows:

- Matabeleland Tuskers
- Mashonaland Eagles
- Mid West Rhinos
- Mountaineers
- Southern Rocks

Rangers played in the 2019–20 Logan Cup but were replaced the following season by the returning Southern Rocks.

Former teams that played in the Logan Cup:

- Manicaland
- Mashonaland
- Matabeleland
- Midlands
- Mashonaland Country Districts
- Mashonaland "A"
- Mashonaland U-23
- Southern Rocks
- Young Mashonaland
- CFX Academy

Masvingo were expected to receive first-class status in 2005–06, but that season of the Logan Cup was cancelled, and the team never had the opportunity to participate.

Teams which have also enjoyed first-class cricket status at some point include:

- Matabeleland Country Districts
- Zimbabwe Board XI
- Zimbabwe XI
- Zimbabweans
- Zimbabwe Board President's XI
- Zimbabwe Select
- Zimbabwe Provinces
- Zimbabwe "A"
- Zimbabwe "B"
- Rhodesia
- Rhodesians
- Rhodesia "A"
- Rhodesia "B"

== See also ==
- Zimbabwean cricket crisis
- Sport in Zimbabwe
