= Tinashe Mhora =

Zimbabwean cricketer (born 1991)

Personal information
- Full name: Tinashe Gerald Mhora
- Born: 1 August 1991 (age 35); Bulawayo, Zimbabwe
- Batting: Left-handed
- Bowling: Right-arm medium-fast
- Role: Batsman

Domestic team information
- Years: Team
- 2009: Westerns
- 2010/11: Matabeleland Tuskers

Career statistics
| Competition | List A | T20 |
|---|---|---|
| Matches | 2 | 2 |
| Runs scored | 26 | 11 |
| Batting average | 13.00 | 5.50 |
| 100s/50s | 0/0 | 0/0 |
| Top score | 23 | 6 |
| Catches/stumpings | 0/– | 1/– |
- Source: CricketArchive, 19 January 2015

Tinashe Gerald Mhora (born 1 August 1991) is a Zimbabwean cricketer who has played domestically for Westerns and the Matabeleland Tuskers.

From Bulawayo, Mhora played two Twenty20 matches for Westerns during the 2009 Metropolitan Bank Twenty20 competition. He scored five runs against Northerns and six against Easterns, coming in low in the batting order in both matches. Later in the 2009 season, Mhora made his debut for the Zimbabwean national under-19 side. He scored two ducks in two One Day Internationals (ODIs) against the Pakistan under-19s in 2009, He went on to tour Bangladesh with the team the following month, playing in another under-19 ODI, and in July 2010 played two ODIs and two Twenty20 Internationals (T20Is) against the South African under-19s.

After Zimbabwean domestic cricket was reorganised for the 2009–10 season, Mhora was assigned to the new Matabeleland Tuskers franchise, based in Bulawayo. He became a regular in the team's reserves side during the following season, playing three-day, one-day, and Twenty20 matches in Franchise B tournaments. Mhora broke through to the Tuskers' senior side for two limited overs matches during the 2010–11 season, both played at the Queens Sports Club. He scored three runs on debut against the Mountaineers in September 2010, opening the batting with captain Gavin Ewing, and then made 23 from 25 balls the following month against the Southern Rocks, coming in third in the batting order. Mhora is yet to play any further matches for the franchise.
