= List of cricket grounds in Zimbabwe =

This is a list of cricket grounds in Zimbabwe. The stadiums included in this list have held first-class, List-A and Twenty20 matches. Additionally, some of the first-class and List-A matches have come in the form of Test matches and One Day Internationals. Only cricket grounds with a capacity to accommodate 1,000 spectators or more are added to this list.

== International cricket stadiums ==
Listed in order of date first used for Test or ODI match.

Official name (known as)	City	First-class side/s	Capacity	First used	Ends	Ref	Image
Queens Sports Club	Bulawayo	Rhodesia (1910-1978); Matabeleland 1994, 2001-2006); Westerns (2008); Manicaland (2003); Centrals (2009); Easterns (2009); Northerns (2009); Matabeleland Tuskers (2009–present)	13,000	1898	• City End • Airport End		
Bulawayo Athletic Club	Bulawayo	Rhodesia (1951); Matabeleland cricket team (1994-2004); Manicaland (2003); Centrals (2009); Easterns (2009); Northerns (2009)	12,000	1951			
Harare Sports Club	Harare	Mashonaland (1994-2006); Northerns (2007-2008); Zimbabwe Provinces (2007); Centrals (2009); Easterns (2009); Mashonaland Eagles (2009–present)	10,000	1909	• City End • Club House End		
Takashinga Cricket Club	Harare	Manicaland (2003–present)		2003			
Kwekwe Sports Club	Kwekwe	Midlands (2001-2006); Centrals (2007-2008); Mid West Rhinos (2009–present)	1,000	1961	n/a		

== Proposed venue ==
Listed in order of proposed venue for Test and ODI match.

Stadium	Capacity	City	Tenant(s)	Opening
Mosi-oa-Tunya International Cricket Stadium	10,000	Victoria Falls		TBA

== See also ==
- Lists of stadiums
