= 2008 Metropolitan Bank Twenty20 =

2007–08 Metropolitan Bank Twenty20
- Administrator: Zimbabwe Cricket
- Cricket format: Twenty20
- Tournament format(s): Group stage and Final
- Champions: Easterns (1st title)
- Participants: 5
- Matches: 11
- Most runs: 267 – Hamilton Masakadza (Easterns)
- Most wickets: 8 – Keith Dabengwa (Westerns)

The 2007–08 Metropolitan Bank Twenty20 was a Twenty20 cricket competition held in Zimbabwe from 19 to 21 March 2008. It was won by Easterns, who defeated Westerns in the final by seven runs.

== Fixtures and results ==
=== Group stage ===
Team	Pld	W	L	NR	A	BP	CP	Pts	Net R/R
Easterns	4	4	0	0	0	4	0	24	+2.117
Westerns	4	2	2	0	0	2	1	13	+0.497
Northerns	4	2	2	0	0	1	0	11	+1.105
Centrals	4	1	3	0	0	0	1	6	–0.880
Southerns	4	1	3	0	0	1	0	6	–2.709
Source:CricketArchive

==== Final ====
20 November
Scorecard

Easterns; 142/9 (20 overs)	v	Westerns; 135/9 (20 overs)
Hamilton Masakadza 82* (57); Thabo Mboyi 3/20 (4 overs)		Keith Dabengwa 42 (31); Prosper Utseya 2/23 (4 overs)

Easterns won by 7 runs
Harare Sports Club, Harare
Umpires: Kevan Barbour and Russell Tiffin
Player of the match: Hamilton Masakadza (Easterns)

- Easterns won the toss and elected to bat.
