= Tinashe (given name) =

Tinashe is a Shona given name, popular in Zimbabwe and amongst Zimbabwean expatriates. It is a unisex name. People with the name include:

- Tinashe Chimbambo (born 1989), Zimbabwean cricketer
- Tinashé Fakerley (born 1984), British musician known as Rationale
- Tinashe Hove (born 1984), Zimbabwean cricketer
- Tinashe Kajese-Bolden, Zimbabwean actress
- Tinashe Mhora (born 1991), Zimbabwean cricketer
- Tinashe Mutanga (born 1993), Zimbabwean sprinter
- Tinashe Nengomasha (born 1982), Zimbabwean association footballer
- Tinashe Panyangara (born 1985), Zimbabwean international cricketer
- Tinashe Ruswa (born 1985), Zimbabwean cricketer

The name has also been used mononymously by:

- Tinashe (born 1993), American singer and actress
