= New Zealand cricket team in Zimbabwe in 2011–12 =

	Zimbabwe	New Zealand
- Dates: 15 October 2011 – 5 November 2011
Captains	Brendan Taylor	Ross Taylor

Test series
- Result: New Zealand won the 1-match series 1–0
Most runs	Brendan Taylor (167)	Ross Taylor (152)
Most wickets	Daniel Vettori (8)	Kyle Jarvis (6)
- Player of the series: Daniel Vettori (NZ)

One Day International series
- Results: New Zealand won the 3-match series 2–1
Most runs	Brendan Taylor (310)	Martin Guptill (179)
Most wickets	Njabulo Ncube (3)	Andy McKay (7)
- Player of the series: Brendan Taylor (Zim)

Twenty20 International series
- Results: New Zealand won the 2-match series 2–0
Most runs	Chamu Chibhabha (74)	Brendon McCullum (145)
Most wickets	Kyle Jarvis (2)	Nathan McCullum (5)

The New Zealand national cricket team toured Zimbabwe from 14 October to 6 November 2011. The tour consisted of two Twenty20 Internationals (T20Is), three One Day Internationals (ODIs) and one Test. With the exception of the 3rd ODI, New Zealand won all the matches against Zimbabwe.

== Squads ==
Limited overs		Tests	
Zimbabwe	New Zealand	Zimbabwe	New Zealand
Brendan Taylor (c); Charles Coventry; Chamu Chibhabha; Elton Chigumbura; Kyle Jarvis; Hamilton Masakadza; Keegan Meth; Natsai Mushangwe; Christopher Mpofu; Forster Mutizwa; Ray Price; Vusi Sibanda; Tatenda Taibu; Prosper Utseya; Malcolm Waller	Ross Taylor (c); Graeme Aldridge; Doug Bracewell; James Franklin; Martin Guptill; Brendon McCullum; Nathan McCullum; Andy McKay; Kyle Mills; Rob Nicol; Jacob Oram; Jesse Ryder; BJ Watling; Kane Williamson; Luke Woodcock	Brendan Taylor (c); Regis Chakabva; Elton Chigumbura; Kyle Jarvis; Hamilton Masakadza; Tino Mawoyo; Keegan Meth; Chris Mpofu; Natsai Mushangwe; Forster Mutizwa; Njabulo Ncube; Ray Price; Vusi Sibanda; Prosper Utseya; Malcolm Waller	Ross Taylor (c); Doug Bracewell; Dean Brownlie; Martin Guptill; Jesse Ryder; Chris Martin; Brendon McCullum; Andy McKay; Kyle Mills; Jeetan Patel; Tim Southee; Daniel Vettori; Kane Williamson; BJ Watling; Reece Young

== Tour matches ==
=== Two-day: Zimbabwe XI v New Zealanders ===
28–29 October
Scorecard

New Zealanders	v	Zimbabwe XI
344/8 (90 overs); Kane Williamson 86* (142); Prosper Utseya 3/75 (24 overs)		241 (70.5 overs); Malcolm Waller 66 (104); Chris Martin 3/31 (12.5 overs)
49/0 (12 overs); Daniel Vettori 32 (37)

Match drawn
Queens Sports Club, Bulawayo
Umpires: Lucky Ngwenya (Zim) and Trevor Phiri (Zim)

- New Zealanders won the toss and chose to bat

== T20I series ==
=== 1st T20I ===
15 October
Scorecard

Zimbabwe; 123/8 (20 overs)	v	New Zealand; 127/0 (13.3 overs)
Brendan Taylor 50* (46); Kyle Mills 2/15 (4 overs)		Brendon McCullum 81* (46)

New Zealand won by 10 wickets
Harare Sports Club, Harare
Umpires: Jeremiah Matibiri and Russell Tiffin
Player of the match: Brendon McCullum (NZ)

- New Zealand won the toss and elected to field.
- Doug Bracewell (NZ), Kane Williamson (NZ), Forster Mutizwa (Zim) and Malcolm Waller (Zim) all made their T20I debuts.

=== 2nd T20I ===
17 October
Scorecard

New Zealand; 187/3 (18 overs)	v	Zimbabwe; 154 (16.5 overs)
Martin Guptill 67 (46); Kyle Jarvis 2/36 (4 overs)		Chamu Chibhabha 65 (39); Nathan McCullum 3/23 (3 overs)

New Zealand won by 34 runs (D/L)
Harare Sports Club, Harare
Umpires: Owen Chirombe and Jeremiah Matibiri
Player of the match: Martin Guptill (NZ)

- Zimbabwe won the toss and elected to field.
- Graeme Aldridge (NZ) made his T20I debut.

== ODI series ==
=== 1st ODI ===
20 October
Scorecard

Zimbabwe; 231/6 (50 overs)	v	New Zealand; 232/1 (43.3 overs)
Brendan Taylor 128* (120); Doug Bracewell 3/55 (10 overs)		Rob Nicol 108* (131); Hamilton Masakadza 1/13 (3 overs)

New Zealand won by 9 wickets
Harare Sports Club, Harare
Umpires: Bruce Oxenford (Aus) and Russell Tiffin (Zim)
Player of the match: Rob Nicol (NZ)

- Zimbabwe won the toss and elected to bat.
- Doug Bracewell and Rob Nicol (both NZ) made their ODI debuts.

=== 2nd ODI ===
22 October
Scorecard

Zimbabwe; 259/8 (50 overs)	v	New Zealand; 261/6 (48.2 overs)
Brendan Taylor 107* (105); Andy McKay 4/53 (10 overs)		Martin Guptill 105 (121); Keegan Meth 2/52 (10 overs)

New Zealand won by 4 wickets
Harare Sports Club, Harare
Umpires: Owen Chirombe (Zim) and Bruce Oxenford (Aus)
Player of the match: Martin Guptill (NZ)

- New Zealand won the toss and elected to field.
- Graeme Aldridge (NZ) made his ODI debut.

=== 3rd ODI ===
25 October
Scorecard

New Zealand; 328/5 (50 overs)	v	Zimbabwe; 329/9 (49.5 overs)
Ross Taylor 119 (126); Njabulo Ncube 3/69 (8.5 overs)		Malcolm Waller 99* (74); Jacob Oram 3/44 (9.5 overs)

Zimbabwe won by 1 wicket
Queens Sports Club, Bulawayo
Umpires: Owen Chriombe (Zim) and Bruce Oxenford (Aus)
Player of the match: Malcolm Waller (Zim)

- New Zealand won the toss and elected to bat.
- Natsai Mushangwe and Njabulo Ncube (both Zim) made their ODI debuts.

== Test series ==
=== Only Test ===
1–5 November
Scorecard

New Zealand	v	Zimbabwe
426 (143.3 overs); Martin Guptill 109 (236); Christopher Mpofu 4/92 (34 overs)		313 (121.5 overs); Vusi Sibanda 93 (193); Daniel Vettori 5/70 (43 overs)
252/8d (71 overs); Ross Taylor 76 (130); Kyle Jarvis 5/64 (18 overs)		331 (108.1 overs); Brendan Taylor 117 (147); Doug Bracewell 5/85 (25 overs)

New Zealand won by 34 runs
Queens Sports Club, Bulawayo
Umpires: Marais Erasmus (SA) and Bruce Oxenford (Aus)
Player of the match: Daniel Vettori (NZ)

- New Zealand won the toss and elected to bat.
- Rain delayed start to Day 2
- Doug Bracewell and Dean Brownlie (NZ) and Regis Chakabva, Njabulo Ncube and Malcolm Waller (Zim) all made their Test match debuts.
