= 2017–18 Stanbic Bank 20 Series =

Cricket tournament

- Dates: April 2018 –
- Administrator(s): Zimbabwe Cricket
- Cricket format: Twenty20 cricket
- Tournament format(s): Round-robin and Final
- Participants: 5

The 2017–18 Stanbic Bank 20 Series was planned to be the seventh edition of the Stanbic Bank 20 Series, a Twenty20 cricket tournament in Zimbabwe. The competition was scheduled to start in April 2018 and would have included a new team, the Rising Stars, along with the existing four teams. Two foreign teams were also expected to be included in the competition. Originally the T20 tournament was scheduled to open the Zimbabwean 2017–18 domestic calendar in September 2017. However, it was moved back to April as it clashed with other T20 competitions being held, before eventually being cancelled.

== Teams ==
The following teams were scheduled to compete in the tournament:

- Mashonaland Eagles
- Matabeleland Tuskers
- Mid West Rhinos
- Mountaineers
- Rising Stars
