= Universals Sports Club =

Cricket ground in Harare, Zimbabwe

Ground information
- Location: Harare
- Coordinates: 17.8413°S 31.0253°E
- Establishment: 2001 (first recorded match)

Team information
Manicaland	(2003/04)
- As of 17 February 2013; Source: Ground profile

Universals Sports Club is a cricket ground in Harare, Zimbabwe. The ground is bordered to the north by the Louis Mountbatten School, to the east by the Rekayi Tangwena Avenue and to the west and south by open ground. Manicaland played a single List A match at the ground in the 2003/04 Faithwear Clothing Inter-Provincial One-Day Competition against Matabeleland. Rain ensured the match ended in no result, with Manicaland having reached 119/2 in their innings, with Piet Rinke and Neil Ferreira recording half centuries.

== See also ==
- List of cricket grounds in Zimbabwe
