= New Zealand cricket team in India in 2010–11 =

International cricket tour

	India	New Zealand
- Dates: 4 November 2010 – 10 December 2010
Captains	MS Dhoni (Tests); Gautam Gambhir (ODIs)	Daniel Vettori

Test series
- Result: India won the 3-match series 1–0
Most runs	Virender Sehwag (398)	Brendon McCullum (370)
Most wickets	Pragyan Ojha (12)	Daniel Vettori (14)
- Player of the series: Harbhajan Singh (Ind)

One Day International series
- Results: India won the 5-match series 5–0
Most runs	Gautam Gambhir (329)	James Franklin (187)
Most wickets	Ravichandran Ashwin (11)	Andy McKay (7)
- Player of the series: Gautam Gambhir (Ind)

The New Zealand national cricket team toured India and played three Test matches and five ODIs between 4 November and 10 December 2010.

== Squads ==
Tests		ODIs	
India	New Zealand	India	New Zealand
Mahendra Singh Dhoni (c & wk); Virender Sehwag (vc); Rahul Dravid; Gautam Gambhir; Zaheer Khan; VVS Laxman; Amit Mishra; Pragyan Ojha; Cheteshwar Pujara; Suresh Raina; Ishant Sharma; Harbhajan Singh; Sreesanth; Sachin Tendulkar; Murali Vijay	Daniel Vettori (c); Brent Arnel; Hamish Bennett; Martin Guptill; Gareth Hopkins (wk); Chris Martin; Brendon McCullum; Tim McIntosh; Andy McKay; Jeetan Patel; Jesse Ryder; Tim Southee; Ross Taylor; Bradley-John Watling; Kane Williamson	Gautam Gambhir (c); Suresh Raina; Ravindra Jadeja; Ashish Nehra; Sreesanth; Vinay Kumar; Saurabh Tiwary; Wriddhiman Saha (wk for 1st 3 ODIs); Yuvraj Singh; Rohit Sharma; Virat Kohli; Murali Vijay; Ravichandran Ashwin; Munaf Patel; Parthiv Patel (wk for last 2 ODIs); Zaheer Khan (2nd, 3rd and 4th ODIs)	Daniel Vettori (c); Scott Styris; James Franklin; Gareth Hopkins (wk); Brendon McCullum; Kyle Mills; Daryl Tuffey(1st ODI); Jamie How; Andy McKay; Ross Taylor; Martin Guptill; Kane Williamson; Tim Southee; Nathan McCullum; Grant Elliott

== Test series ==
=== 1st Test ===
4–8 November 2010
Scorecard

India	v	New Zealand
487 (151.5 overs); Virender Sehwag 173 (199); Daniel Vettori 4/118 (54.5 overs)		459 (165.4 overs); Kane Williamson 131 (299); Pragyan Ojha 4/107 (53 overs)
266 (102.4 overs); Harbhajan Singh 115 (193); Chris Martin 5/63 (27 overs)		22/1 (10 overs); Brendon McCullum 11* (28); Zaheer Khan 1/7 (4 overs)

Match drawn
Sardar Patel Stadium, Ahmedabad
Umpires: Steve Davis (Aus) and Kumar Dharmasena (SL)
Player of the match: Harbhajan Singh (Ind)

- India won the toss and elected to bat.
- Test debut: Kane Williamson and Hamish Bennett (NZ)

=== 2nd Test ===
12–16 November 2010
Scorecard

New Zealand	v	India
350 (117.3 overs); Tim McIntosh 102 (254); Zaheer Khan 4/69 (27 overs)		472 (143.4 overs); Harbhajan Singh 111* (116); Daniel Vettori 5/135 (49.4 overs)
448/8d (135 overs); Brendon McCullum 225 (308); Sreesanth 3/121 (27 overs)		68/0 (17 overs); Virender Sehwag 54* (54); Brent Arnel 0/11 (5 overs)

Match drawn
Rajiv Gandhi International Cricket Stadium, Hyderabad
Umpires: Kumar Dharmasena (SL) and Simon Taufel (Aus)
Player of the match: Brendon McCullum (NZ)

- New Zealand won the toss and elected to bat.

=== 3rd Test ===
20–24 November 2010
Scorecard

New Zealand	v	India
193 (66.3 overs); Jesse Ryder 59 (113); Ishant Sharma 4/43 (18 overs)		566/8d (165 overs); Rahul Dravid 191 (396); Daniel Vettori 3/178 (58 overs)
175 (51.2 overs); Tim Southee 31 (25); Ishant Sharma 3/15 (6.2 overs)

India won by an innings and 198 runs
Vidarbha Cricket Association Stadium, Nagpur
Umpires: Nigel Llong (Eng) and Simon Taufel (Aus)
Player of the match: Rahul Dravid (Ind)

- New Zealand won the toss and elected to bat.
- Play on Day 1 was delayed due to rain and reduced due to bad light.
- Test debut: Andy McKay (NZ)

== ODI series ==
=== 1st ODI ===
28 November 2010
Scorecard

India; 276 (49 overs)	v	New Zealand; 236 (45.2 overs)
Virat Kohli 105 (104); Andy McKay 4/62 (10 overs)		Ross Taylor 66 (69); Sreesanth 3/30 (5.2 overs)

India won by 40 runs
Nehru Stadium, Guwahati
Umpires: Nigel Llong (Eng) and Shavir Tarapore (Ind)
Player of the match: Virat Kohli (Ind)

- New Zealand won the toss and elected to field.
- ODI debuts: Wriddhiman Saha (Ind)

=== 2nd ODI ===
1 December 2010
Scorecard

New Zealand; 258/8 (50 overs)	v	India; 259/2 (43 overs)
Martin Guptill 70 (102); Sreesanth 4/47 (9 overs)		Gautam Gambhir 138* (116); Daniel Vettori 1/32 (8 overs)

India won by 8 wickets
Sawai Mansingh Stadium, Jaipur
Umpires: Sanjay Hazare (Ind) and Nigel Llong (England)
Player of the match: Gautam Gambhir (Ind)

- India won the toss and elected to field.

=== 3rd ODI ===
4 December 2010
Scorecard

New Zealand; 224/9 (50 overs)	v	India; 229/1 (39.3 overs)
James Franklin 72* (108); Yusuf Pathan 2/27 (8 overs)		Gautam Gambhir 126* (117)

India won by 9 wickets
Reliance Stadium, Vadodara
Umpires: Richard Kettleborough (Eng) and Shavir Tarapore (Ind)
Player of the match: Gautam Gambhir (Ind)

- India won the toss and elected to field.

=== 4th ODI ===
7 December 2010
Scorecard

New Zealand; 315/7 (50 overs)	v	India; 321/5 (48.5 overs)
James Franklin 98* (69); Yusuf Pathan 3/49 (9 overs)		Yusuf Pathan 123* (96); Nathan McCullum 2/38 (7.5 overs)

India won by 5 wickets
M. Chinnaswamy Stadium, Bengaluru
Umpires: Richard Kettleborough (Eng) and Amiesh Saheba (Ind)
Player of the match: Yusuf Pathan (Ind)

- India won the toss and elected to field.

=== 5th ODI ===
10 December 2010
Scorecard

New Zealand; 103 (27 overs)	v	India; 107/2 (21.1 overs)
Scott Styris 24 (45); Ravichandran Ashwin 3/24 (8 overs)		Parthiv Patel 56* (70); Nathan McCullum 1/26 (6 overs)

India won by 8 wickets
M. A. Chidambaram Stadium, Chennai
Umpires: Richard Kettleborough (Eng) and Amiesh Saheba (Ind)
Player of the match: Yuvraj Singh (Ind)

- New Zealand won the toss and elected to bat.
