= Brendan Taylor =

Zimbabwean cricketer

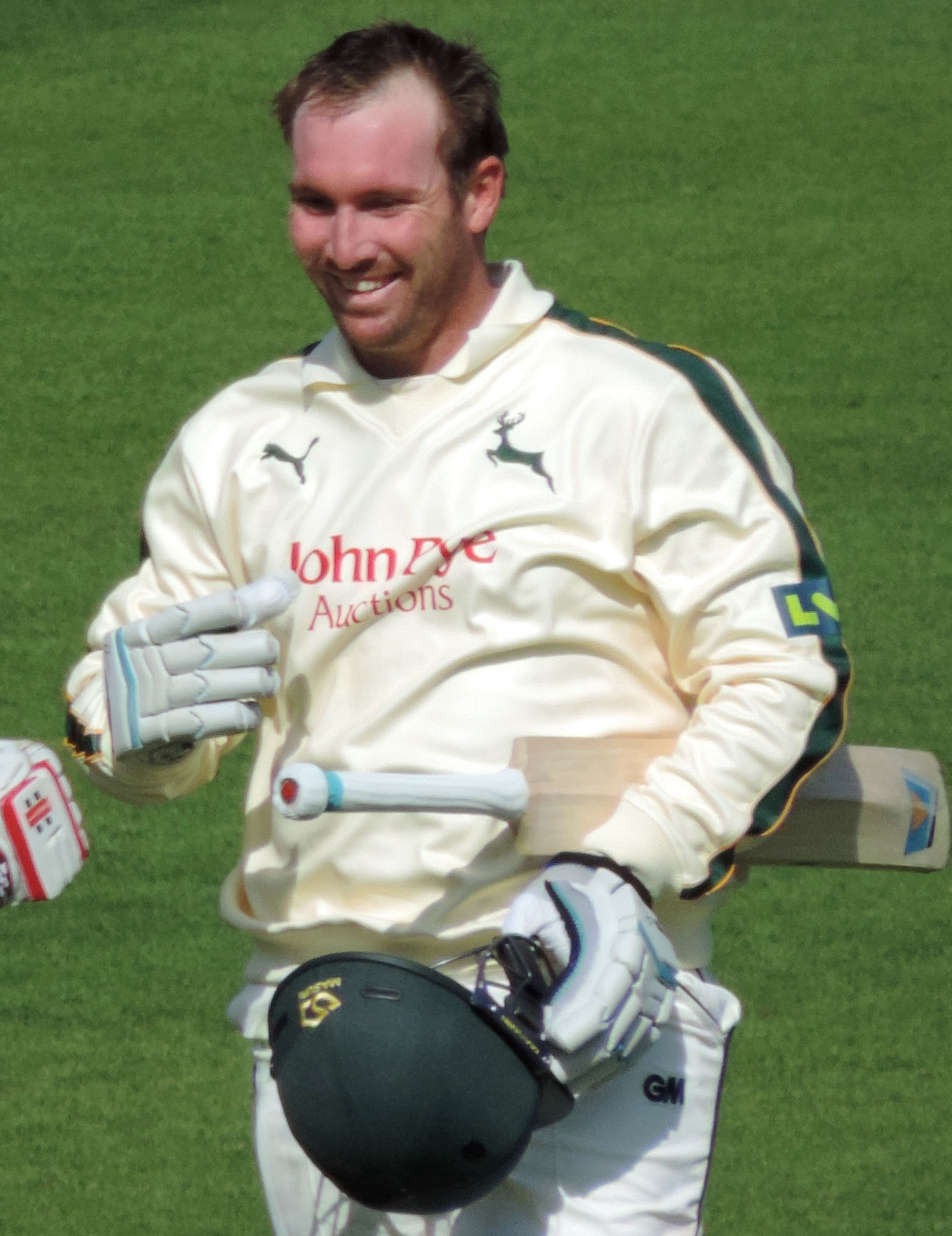
- Taylor playing for Nottinghamshire in 2015

Personal information
- Full name: Brendan Ross Murray Taylor
- Born: 6 February 1986 (age 40); Harare, Zimbabwe
- Batting: Right-handed
- Bowling: Right-arm off break
- Role: Wicket-keeper batsman

International information
- National side: Zimbabwe (2004–present)
- Test debut (cap 64): 6 May 2004 v Sri Lanka
- Last Test: 5 November 2026 v Afghanistan
- ODI debut (cap 80): 20 April 2004 v Sri Lanka
- Last ODI: 23 October 2026 v Afghanistan
- ODI shirt no.: 1
- T20I debut (cap 9): 28 November 2006 v Bangladesh
- Last T20I: 9 February 2026 v Oman
- T20I shirt no.: 1

Domestic team information
- Years: Team
- 2002/03–2005/05: Mashonaland
- 2007/08–2008/09: Northerns
- 2009/10–2020/21: Mid West Rhinos
- 2011/12: Wellington
- 2012–2013: Chittagong Kings
- 2013: Prime Bank Cricket Club
- 2015–2017: Nottinghamshire
- 2019: Khulna Titans
- 2019: Lahore Qalandars
- 2020: Kandy Tuskers

Career statistics
Competition	Test	ODI	T20I	FC
Matches	38	213	59	141
Runs scored	2,633	6,845	1,216	9,884
Batting average	37.61	34.92	24.32	41.01
100s/50s	7/13	11/40	1/6	33/37
Top score	171	145*	123	217
Balls bowled	42	396	30	384
Wickets	0	9	1	4
Bowling average	–	45.11	17.00	56.25
5 wickets in innings	–	0	0	0
10 wickets in match	–	0	0	0
Best bowling	–	3/54	2/36	2/36
Catches/stumpings	30/0	139/29	30/2	148/4
- Source: ESPNcricinfo, 10 November 2026

Brendan Ross Murray Taylor (born 6 February 1986) is a Zimbabwean international cricketer and a former Zimbabwean captain, who plays all formats of the game. Taylor is a right-handed batsman but is also an off spinner. In 2015, former Zimbabwe captain Alistair Campbell described Taylor as "our standout player for the last seven or eight years". He is known for his unorthodox shots especially his ability to play upper cuts over the third man and ramp shots with elegance and are often considered as his trademark signature shots. His style of play and ability to make substantial contribution with the bat often drew comparisons with that of Andy Flower. He represented Zimbabwe in four ICC T20 World Cup tournaments in 2007, 2010, 2012 and 2014. Also, he represented Zimbabwe in three ICC ODI world cups as well in 2007, 2011 and 2015.

He captained Zimbabwe in ODIs until 2015 ICC Cricket World Cup, having taken over the reins from Elton Chigumbura after the 2011 Cricket World Cup. He became the first Zimbabwean batsman to hit back-to-back One-Day International (ODI) centuries (128 not out and 107 not out), achieved against New Zealand in October 2011. He repeated the feat again at the 2015 ICC Cricket World Cup. He was selected to play Twenty20 cricket for the Wellington cricket team as an overseas player in New Zealand's HRV Twenty20 Cup in December 2011. His 433 runs at the 2015 ICC Cricket World Cup set a new record for Zimbabwe in any World Cup. His 11 centuries in ODIs is also a Zimbabwe record surpassing Alistair Campbell's 7.

Taylor quit his national team soon after the 2015 World Cup but on 14 September 2017, he terminated his contract with Nottinghamshire to return home to Zimbabwe. It was announced that Taylor had decided to return home and play for Zimbabwe for personal reasons.

In November 2018, Taylor became the first batsman for Zimbabwe to score a century in each innings in a Test on two occasions. In October 2020, in the first ODI against Pakistan, Taylor scored his 17th century in international cricket to become the batsman with the most centuries for Zimbabwe across all three formats. Due to all these achievements, Taylor is often regarded as one of the finest batsman of Zimbabwe in the modern era. In July 2021, during Zimbabwe's home series against Bangladesh, Taylor played in his 200th ODI match. In September 2021, ahead of Zimbabwe's third ODI match against Ireland, Taylor announced that he would retire from international cricket following the match.

In January 2022, he made a revelation about his forced involvement in spot-fixing due to the circumstances he had to deal with and stated that he will be facing a lengthy international ban for failing to report details related to it on time. Later the same month, Taylor was banned from all cricket for 3 1/2 years by the International Cricket Council (ICC). In August 2025 he returned to the Zimbabwean Test team.

== International career ==
=== Early years ===
Taylor was nurtured by Iain Campbell, the father of Zimbabwean Test cricketer Alistair Campbell, at Lilfordia School near Harare. During his teens, where he attended St. John's College, Taylor emerged as a regular choice for national age-group teams and played in two Under-19 World Cups. He made his first-class debut for Mashonaland A at the age of 15. The very next year, he shot to prominence by scoring 200 not out in the B Division of the Logan Cup. Strong domestic performances and a mass exodus of top-level players forced Taylor into the national team at the age of 18 against Sri Lanka in 2003–04. He made his ODI and international debut against Sri Lanka on 20 April 2004 at Bulawayo ad opened the batting alongside Vusi Sibanda but had a tough start to his international career after being clean bowled by Chaminda Vaas for duck on his debut. He made his test debut a month later on 6 May 2004 against Sri Lanka in a losing cause.

Taylor made his debut for Zimbabwe at a time when many of the country's leading players rebelled against Zimbabwe Cricket (formally known as the Zimbabwean Cricket Union) and made themselves unavailable to represent the team. Consequently, to fill the gap, many young players were prematurely brought into the team, which weakened the team, especially at Test level. Taylor was one of the youngest and most promising in this lot. In 2006, despite not having signed a new contract, he was selected in the national team. Soon, he took over the wicketkeeping responsibilities as well following the temporary departure of Tatenda Taibu. He shot to international prominence after his 60 not out helped Zimbabwe achieve a five-wicket upset over Australia in the 2007 ICC World Twenty20.

In July–August 2007, Taylor was re-selected for the Zimbabwe Select team against South Africa A, having not been available against India A. He scored just 15 runs (2 and 13) in the second first-class match, having been overlooked for the first game. With Tatenda Taibu back in the team, Taylor was no longer needed behind the stumps. In the ODI series against the full South Africa team, the entire Zimbabwe squad performed above themselves (including their highest ODI score against South Africa), but falling short on all 3 occasions. Taylor too had a good series, ending as the 5th highest run-scorer, with 105 runs at 35.00. Taylor's first Twenty20 outing was against Eagles in September 2006 and the second was versus Bangladesh in December 2006.

=== Defeating Bangladesh, 2006 ===
In the third ODI of the Bangladesh tour of Zimbabwe (2006), Taylor played a crucial role in a Zimbabwe win. A close game throughout, Zimbabwe required five runs from the final ball, effectively meaning a six needed to be hit to win the game. Taylor successfully hit a six off the bowling of Mashrafe Mortaza on the last ball, giving Zimbabwe the victory, and contributing to their series win. Taylor remained undefeated on 79 off just 72 balls and also awarded the man of the match for his match winning efforts with the bat.

=== The ICC World Cup 2007 campaign ===
After a relatively unsuccessful series at home against Bangladesh in February 2007, in which there were some concerns over his commitment to the team, he was still selected for the 15-man squad to tour to the West Indies for the World Cup. With over 60 ODIs under his belt, he is the team's most experienced player.

After a decent World Cup campaign, including 87 runs from 3 matches at an average of 29.00 (including a half-century; 50), Taylor went to play club cricket in the Netherlands, despite a ruling by the Zimbabwe Cricket board that any player leaving the country to play club cricket would be overlooked for selection.

=== Defeating Australia, 2007 ===
Into the action early, Taylor caught Matthew Hayden off then bowling of Chigumbura. Taylor was also involved in a first class stumping, which saw Andrew Symonds depart. Taylor also made a crucial run out, with only one stump to aim at, to dismiss Mitchell Johnson.

With Zimbabwe restricting Australia to just 138, by Twenty20 standards a poor score, Taylor also opened their innings. While Vusi Sibanda got the ball rolling with several quick boundaries, Taylor was the key man, and batted out the innings. With both teams reasonably even placed for the first dozen overs, it was when Brad Hodge came on to bowl his gentle offspin in the 15th over that Taylor turned the match in Zimbabwe's favour. 15 was scored from the over, including two massive sixes by Taylor, the longest of which went 77 metres. With 12 runs required from the final over, Taylor played a cheeky sweep which ended being 4 from the first ball. Followed by a single, a two and another single, Zimbabwe needed 4 runs from 2 balls with Taylor facing, Chigumbura at the non-strikers end. With a ball to spare, 4 leg-byes were scored, with the ball running down to fine leg. Taylor ended with 60 not out from 45 deliveries. His fine all round performance with the bat and gloves won him the man of the match award.

In June 2008, Taylor joined the Lashings World XI based in England. This was seen as somewhat controversial due to reports of tension between Taylor and Zimbabwe Cricket Board, as a result of the board's policy of denying players to play abroad.

=== Against South Africa, 2010 and thereafter ===
Brendan Taylor scored 145 not out against the South African cricket team he carried his bat throughout the ODI innings and became only the ninth person to do so. South Africa scored 351/6 and Taylor scored 145 of 136 deliveries as Zimbabwe managed 287/6, yet again performing well with the bat but poorly with the ball. That knock proved something of a turning point for him, and he struck another century in the same year against Sri Lanka and proved Zimbabwe's stand-out batsman at the 2011 World Cup, with his upper-cut to third man being described by ESPNcricinfo writer Osman Samiuddin as "one of the lasting images of Group A".

=== 2011 World Cup campaign ===
He was also part of the squad for the 2011 Cricket World Cup where he ended up being the third highest runscorer for Zimbabwe with 170 runs in six matches. He was known for his counter-attacking knock opening the batting in a match against hosts Sri Lanka during the World Cup where he top scored for Zimbabwe with 80 off just 72 balls and added a crucial 116 run partnership for the opening wicket alongside Regis Chakabva. The 116 run stand also remains the highest opening partnership by a pair for Zimbabwe in a World Cup match. Despite the duo's valiant effort with the bat, Zimbabwe crumbled to 188 in a run chase requiring 328.

=== Return to Test cricket, 2011 ===
Following poor performances in the 2011 Cricket World Cup, Taylor was appointed captain of Zimbabwe on 24 June 2011, taking over from Chigumbura. He captained the team on their return to Test cricket, against Bangladesh, at the Harare Sports Club on 4 August 2011. In the first innings of the match he scored 71 and during the second innings he scored 105* and he then became the second Zimbabwean after David Houghton to score a century in his first match as captain, Zimbabwe sealed a 130 run victory and Brendan Taylor was named man of the match for his century.

=== New Zealand Series, 2011 ===
In the ODI series of New Zealand's tour to Zimbabwe, Taylor unleashed his best form to date. In the 1st ODI, he scored 128* rescuing Zimbabwe from a precarious position to a respectable 231. In the next match, he scored another century (107*) leading the charge from the front again and in the process, becoming the first ever Zimbabwean batsman to score back-to-back ODI tons. However, he did not receive any support from the other batsmen and despite his tons, Zimbabwe lost both the games. In the final ODI, chasing a sizable 329 to win, Taylor set the tone of the chase with a brisk 75 off 65 balls, which enabled Malcolm Waller and Elton Chigumbura to give Zimbabwe a famous win. With 310 runs in the series at an average of 310.00 and a strike rate of over 100, Taylor was adjudged the Man of the Series. His 310 runs was at the time the record number of runs in a three-match ODI series. He scored 50 and 117 in the one-off test match. By the process, Taylor became only the second Zimbabwean batsman after Kevin Arnott to score a century in the fourth innings of a Test match, and contained 5 huge sixes. Despite his half-century and his second Test cricket ton, New Zealand outlasted him to win a thrilling match. Despite that, Taylor said that his team will continue to play aggressive, attacking test cricket which drew widespread praise from all quarters. In 2011, as a result of his fine performances, he was named the cricketer of the year and the batsman of the year.

He was nominated as one of the nominees for ICC ODI Player of the Year 2012 mainly for his significant performances against New Zealand in 2011.

=== West Indies and Bangladesh, 2013 ===
Taylor only managed to muster a total of 33 runs in the two Tests against the West Indies, at an average of 18, in a Test series where Zimbabwe were comprehensively beaten by the home team, he also performed poorly in the ODI series, scoring 47 runs, averaging 15.66 with a high score of 39. He also played in the T20 series, only scoring 4 runs in 2 matches.

Taylor performed much better under home conditions against the touring Bangladesh in April 2013. He topped the test batting averages for the two Test series, average over 106 a match, with a high score of 171 in the first Test at the Harare Sports Club, leading Zimbabwe to draw the Test series 1–1. In the first Test, he scored twin centuries in both the innings and became the third Zimbabwean to score twin centuries in a same test match.

In the subsequent ODI series, he captained the team to a 2–1 victory in the tournament, although failing to replicate his scores from the Test series. He also led Zimbabwe to draw the T20 series against Bangladesh 1–1.

=== 2015 Cricket World Cup ===
In the 2015 Cricket World Cup, Taylor scored two back to back centuries and became the first and only Zimbabwean cricketer to score back to back centuries in a same World Cup campaign. The first one was against Ireland, where he scored 121 runs from 91 balls. Before the last group stage game against India, Taylor decided to retire from One Day internationals at the mere age of 29. In his last match Taylor scored 138 runs from 110 balls. He was congratulated by both his team and the opposition team India after he got out. Veteran Indian commentator Sunil Gavaskar referring to Taylor's knock of 138 against India, claimed it as one of the best ODI innings that he had ever seen. He was included as a bench player in Cricbuzz's "ICC World Cup 2015 team of the tournament".

He was adjudged as the leading runscorer for Zimbabwe throughout the 2015 World Cup tournament with an aggregate of 433 runs in six matches at an average of 72.16 and was also the fourth overall run-getter during the course of the tournament behind Martin Guptill, Kumar Sangakkara, Shikhar Dhawan and AB de Villiers. He also became the first Zimbabwean to score 400 or more runs in a single edition of the World Cup.

During the 2015 World Cup, he along with Sean Williams put on Zimbabwe's highest fourth wicket partnership of 93 in a World Cup match which came against India. In the same tournament, he along with Sean Williams added Zimbabwe's highest ever fifth wicket partnership of 149 in a World Cup contest against Ireland.

Taylor signed for Nottinghamshire for the 2015 English cricket season. It was later revealed that financial security concerns among Zimbabwean cricketers was the reason behind Taylor's retirement from international cricket as well as that of Kyle Jarvis; another Zimbabwean cricketer, Craig Ervine, had rejected a central contract with Zimbabwe due to the same reason.

=== Test career ===
In the Test arena, Taylor's performances were somewhat below what one would expect of a player at Test level. However, this was attributed to his young age and premature elevation to the national team. However, since Zimbabwe's return to the Test circuit, Taylor has shown remarkable maturity, both as the team's leading batsman and captain. He scored two Test centuries and when he scored a century in the fourth innings of the Test match against New Zealand, on a fifth day pitch, (inclusive of 5 huge sixes), he became the second Zimbabwean after Arnott to score a fourth-innings century in a Test match. Taylor has announced that his team will continue to play aggressive, attacking test cricket which drew widespread praise from all quarters. He also scored two half-centuries, 71 against Bangladesh and 50 against New Zealand.

Although Taylor is primarily a top-order batsman, he has been in the past been successful as a part-time off-break bowler. He was Zimbabwe's first choice wicketkeeper, but gave up the wicketkeeping gloves after the return of Taibu behind the stumps. Following Taibu's retirement in July 2012, Taylor sometimes keeps wicket in ODIs and T20s but not in Tests.

=== Return to international cricket, 2017 ===
On 14 September 2017, Taylor was released from his county deal with Nottinghamshire due to family reasons, thus eligible to play for Zimbabwe again. After 10 days of rest with the family, Taylor joined with Zimbabwean training camps for the upcoming international tours. In October 2017, he was included in Zimbabwe's Test squad for series against West Indies, and played both matches. He only scored a single fifty in four innings, whereas Windies won the series 1–0.

In November 2018, during the second and final test match against Bangladesh which was held in Sher-e-Bangla National Cricket Stadium he went onto score twin centuries in a losing cause as Bangladesh secured a comfortable 218 run win despite his valiant efforts with the bat. He also became the first batsman for Zimbabwe to score a century in each innings in a Test on two separate occasions.

He was named in Zimbabwean squad for the 2018 Cricket World Cup Qualifier and was also the leading runscorer during the competition with 457 runs.

== Domestic and T20 franchise career ==
Taylor has been playing in Zimbabwe's domestic first-class competition, the Logan Cup, since 2002. His domestic one-day debut came for Mashonaland in December 2003.

In the domestic circuit he is one of the most reliable and successful batsman, and in 68 first-class matches, he already has 4,719 with a highest score of 217 and a batting average of 39.99. In List A cricket, he has played 184 matches, scoring 5,528 runs, with a personal best of 145*. His average in those matches are 33.30. In Twenty20 cricket, he has 1,307 in 47 matches at an average of 33.51.

Brendan Taylor was one of the star players in the 2007–08 Metropolitan Bank Twenty20. Taylor missed out on that elusive Twenty20 century by 15 runs when he scored 85 not out against Southerns in the second match of the tournament. Batting first, Taylor opened the batting and guided the Northerns to 3/227 after 20 overs, before going on to record a massive 158 run win. He also scored a second half century, 63 not out, against Centrals, a match Northerns won by 9 wickets with 6 balls to spare. Taylor was the second highest run scorer of the tournament, smashing 168 runs at an average of 84.00.

He scored 95 in his only appearance for Northerns, in the 2008–09 Logan Cup. His team won the match by a massive innings and 290 runs.

In the 2011–12 Stanbic Bank 20 Series, Taylor overcame a blistering ton by Chris Gayle to lead his team Mid West Rhinos to victory. The 171-run massive chase turned out to be a seven-wicket win with three balls to spare, mostly due to Taylor's match-winning knock of 75 in which he shared stands of 56 with the New Zealander Lou Vincent, and then a match-changing 105 for the third wicket with Gary Ballance, who made a quickfire 67 off 34 balls, including four sixes. It was the Rhinos' first win of the tournament.

Taylor was given a contract to represent Wellington as an overseas player in New Zealand's HRV Twenty20 Cup in December 2011. He made his debut for Auckland in the 2011–12 HRV Cup game against Wellington. Wellington went on to finish bottom of the ladder, with just two wins from 10 games, but Taylor was the team's highest scorer with 207 runs, and the eleventh best overall.

In 2013, Taylor was signed by the Chittagong Kings for $30,000. The King's got off to a poor start, however Taylor was one of the highest scorers in the league during this stretch. After the first 5 games, Mahmudullah resigned as the King's captain and Taylor was charged with the captain's duty. With his experience from leading the Zimbabwe National team and Uthura Rudras (Sri Lankan Premier League), Taylor led King's on a 4-game win streak. While on the hot streak, Taylor was the team's leading scorer and 3rd in the league with 316 total runs. Kings ended up reaching the BPL Final, but due to illness Taylor had to return home. Taylor-less Kings came up short in the final, finally losing to the Dhaka Gladiators.

On 13 March 2015, Taylor signed as a Kolpak player for Nottinghamshire, on a three-year contract. On the same day, he announced his retirement from international cricket.

In October 2018, he was named in the squad for the Khulna Titans team, following the draft for the 2018–19 Bangladesh Premier League. In December 2020, he was selected to play for the Rhinos in the 2020–21 Logan Cup.

== Post-playing career and spot-fixing ==
On 24 January 2022, Taylor posted on twitter saying he had been approached to spot-fix by a group of Indian businessmen in October 2019, and he initially could not refuse the offer. He was invited by an unnamed Indian businessman to discuss in detail about sponsorships and the potential launch of a domestic T20 competition in Zimbabwe. The invitation came at a time when Zimbabwean players had not been paid their salaries for about six months.

He revealed that he was blackmailed and cornered by the businessmen in order to make him forcefully engage in spot-fixing after they threatened him that they would leak photographs of him taking cocaine. Taylor agreed to do it by accepting US$15000 as bribes in order to ensure the safety of him and his family, and admitted that he had taken drugs, but also insisted he became a victim of substance abuse. He admitted that he foolishly took the bait after taking cocaine when he was drunk. He admitted that he did not report the incident to the International Cricket Council (ICC) for about four months, and said that he would check into a rehabilitation centre for substance abuse. He insisted further that he will be sanctioned with a multi-year ban due to his delay in reporting of the spot fixing plot.

Taylor also admitted that he had failed a drug test following his final international match, when Zimbabwe toured Ireland in September 2021. He also stated that he had "beaten a few" other drug tests in the two to three years prior to his final match. Zimbabwe Cricket issued a statement to say that they were aware of the investigation, and would wait until the ICC publish its findings before making any comment.

On 28 January 2022, Taylor was banned from all forms of cricket for 3 1/2 years, after he was found to have breached the ICC Anti-Corruption Code and the ICC Anti-Doping Code. The following day, Zimbabwe Cricket said that they were "extremely disappointed" in Taylor's actions and that he had "let cricket down".
