= Darren Stevens =

English cricketer

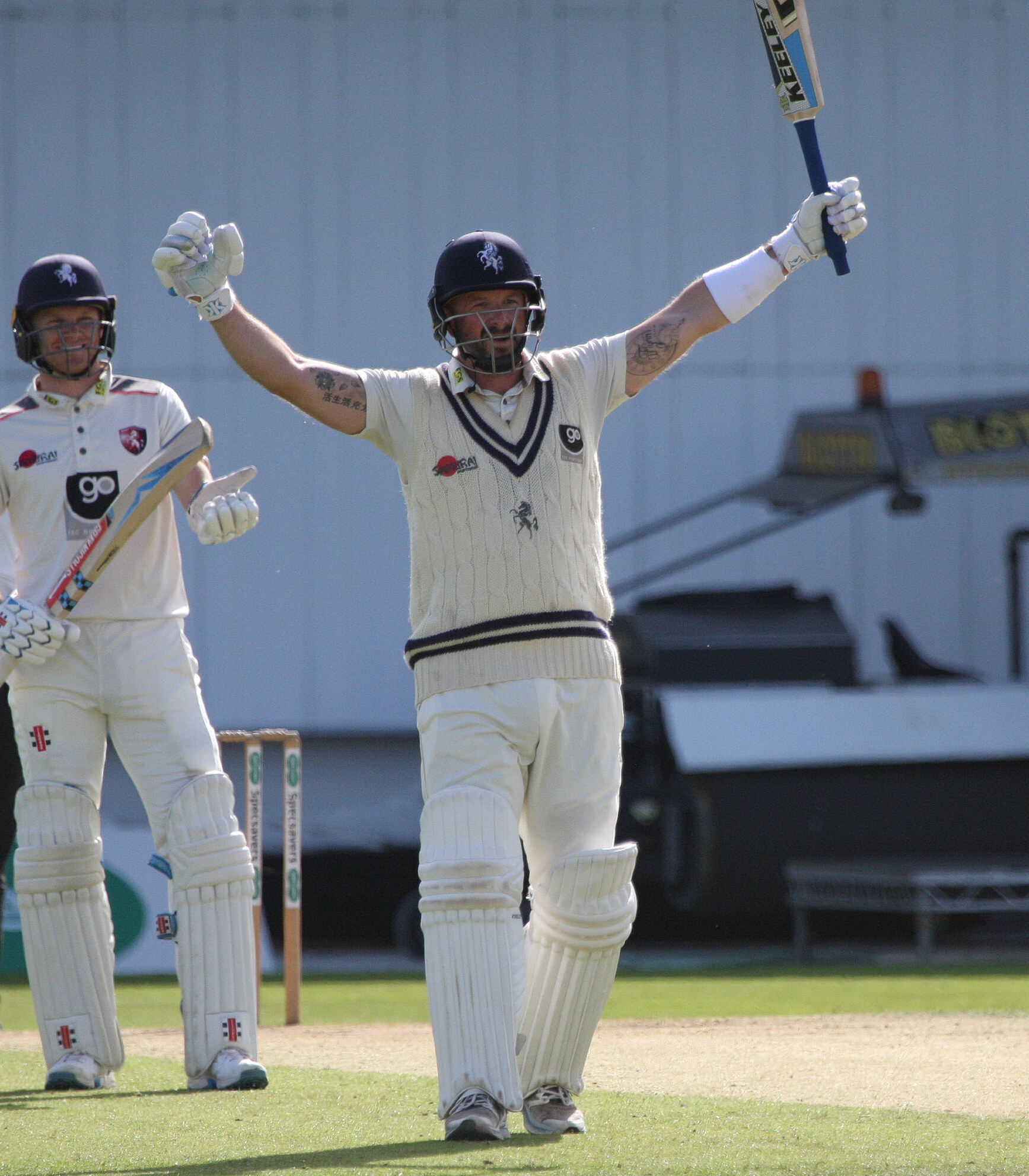
- Stevens in 2019

Personal information
- Full name: Darren Ian Stevens
- Born: 30 April 1976 (age 50); Leicester, Leicestershire, England
- Height: 5 ft 11 in (1.80 m)
- Batting: Right-handed
- Bowling: Right-arm medium
- Role: All-rounder

Domestic team information
- Years: Team
- 1997–2004: Leicestershire
- 2005–2022: Kent (squad no. 3)
- 2010: Mid West Rhinos
- 2010/11: Otago
- 2012–2013: Dhaka Gladiators
- 2015: Comilla Victorians
- 2019: → Derbyshire (on loan) (squad no. 3)
- FC debut: 18 April 1997 Leicestershire v Cambridge University
- Last FC: 19 May 2022 Kent v Northamptonshire
- LA debut: 3 August 1997 Leicestershire v Essex
- Last LA: 17 September 2022 Kent v Lancashire

Career statistics
Competition	FC	LA	T20
Matches	326	327	227
Runs scored	16,676	7,942	4,201
Batting average	35.18	29.96	26.25
100s/50s	38/82	7/47	0/17
Top score	237	147	90
Balls bowled	31,595	6,851	2,440
Wickets	591	162	125
Bowling average	24.78	33.87	26.04
5 wickets in innings	31	3	0
10 wickets in match	2	0	0
Best bowling	8/75	6/25	4/14
Catches/stumpings	205/–	130/–	66/–
- Source: Cricinfo, 17 September 2022

Darren Ian Stevens (born 30 April 1976) is an English former professional cricketer who played for Leicestershire and Kent County Cricket Clubs between 1997 and 2022. An all-rounder, he played as right-handed batsman and bowled right-arm medium-pace deliveries. He scored over 16,000 first-class runs and after the age of 35 took more than 500 wickets and more than 30 five-wicket hauls. Stevens was named as one of the Wisden Cricketers of the Year in the 2021 edition of the almanack.

Stevens retired at the end of the 2022 season at the age of 46. As well as Leicestershire, with whom he started his professional career, and Kent, where he played for 18 seasons, Stevens featured for the England Lions team, played in Zimbabwe for Mid West Rhinos and in New Zealand for Otago and won the Bangladesh Premier League with both Dhaka Gladiators and Comilla Victorians.

== Career ==
Born in Leicester, Stevens played club cricket for local teams Swallows Green and Hinckley Town prior to making his first-class debut for his home county of Leicestershire in 1997. He was initially an opening batsman and his first century came in his fourth match, two years later against Sussex. This innings earned him a seal of approval (as well as a painting) from Colin Cowdrey. He remained, however, on the fringes of the team with Aftab Habib and Ben Smith being preferred in the Leicestershire middle-order. After a strong season in 2002, when he scored 850 runs at an average of 32.69, he was called up to England's Academy squad in Australia and was included in their 30-man squad for the 2003 Cricket World Cup.

After two average seasons for Leicestershire, Stevens was released by his home county at the end of the 2004 season, along with Damian Brandy and George Walker. He then joined Kent for the 2005 season. He made a very good start to his Kent career, scoring over 1,000 runs in a season for the first time in his career. 2006 proved to be disappointing by comparison, yet he still averaged 39. His performances in the Pro40 League, however, brought Kent to the verge of promotion.

In 2007 Stevens helped the Kent Spitfires win the Twenty20 Cup, scoring an unbeaten 30 including the winning runs, against Gloucestershire at Edgbaston. However a week later he injured a groin muscle whilst top-scoring in Kent's victory over Durham and did not bowl for the rest of the season. He played for Mid West Rhinos in the 2009–10 Stanbic Bank 20 Series in Zimbabwe and for Otago in New Zealand during the 2010–11 season.

Though his career began slowly with only four County Championship appearances between 1997 and 1999, Stevens made his mark with a century against Sussex which attracted the attention of former England batsman Colin Cowdrey. With the departure of several leading batsmen, Stevens secured a regular county place with Leicestershire and was taken on development tours of Australia in 2003. After moving to Kent in 2004 he began with a prolific season – 1,277 runs in first-class cricket – and improved his bowling. By 2012 he was a prolific scorer in the Championship and in Twenty20 and one-day cup competitions, where his attacking stroke-play and wicket-taking bowling cemented his place in the Kent middle order and made "Stevo" a firm crowd favourite.

Stevens played for Dhaka Gladiators during the first two Bangladesh Premier League seasons in 2012 and 2013. On both occasions the team won the title. In August 2013, Stevens was charged by the ICC for failing to report two corrupt approaches in connection to games in the BPL. The charges were connected to allegations of match fixing within the Gladiators organisation which saw a total of nine people charged by the ICC. In the last game of the 2013 season, Stevens hit 205 not out and believed that the knock could be his last ever innings. In February 2014, Stevens was found not guilty by the tribunal.

In September 2015 Kent announced that Stevens would be awarded a benefit year in 2016. During the 2015 off-season he returned to Bangladesh to play in the third instalment of the Bangladesh Premier League, playing for Comilla Victorians. He and Victorians captain Mashrafe Mortaza were the only players to have taken part in the first three BPL seasons. The team won the 2015 Bangladesh Premier League title with Stevens playing in the final, meaning that he was part of the winning franchise in three BPL titles.

In July 2019 Stevens was loaned out by Kent to Derbyshire for the T20 Blast competition. Stevens, who was still a major part of Kent's team in the County Championship, but had not played for Kent in the 2018 Blast, was not part of the county's plans for the competition but wanted to play T20 cricket during the season with an eye to maintaining his fitness. Later the same month it was announced that Stevens would leave Kent at the end of the season after 15 seasons playing for the county. His performances, however, led to the decision being reversed and a new contract was offered to Stevens after he made his highest first-class score of 237, at more than a run a ball, against Yorkshire in September at the age of 43. In the same match, he took 5–20 to become the second-oldest player to score 200 and take five wickets in an innings in a first-class match, the oldest being W G Grace.

In the shortened 2020 season, Stevens was the third leading wicket taker in the 2020 Bob Willis Trophy, taking 29 wickets at a bowling average of under 16 runs per wicket. His contract was subsequently renewed for the 2021 season, and he was named as one of the Wisden Cricketers of the Year in the 2021 edition of the almanack, at the age of 44 becoming the fourth oldest player to be named. Lawrence Booth, the editor of Wisden was quoted as saying he was "one of the domestic game's most unsung heroes". He began the 2021 season by scoring a century in Kent's opening championship game against Northants, becoming the oldest player to score a County Championship century since 1986. Later in the season came a record-breaking contribution of 160 out of a stand of 166 for the ninth wicket in a match against Glamorgan, the highest proportion of any stand over 100 in first-class cricket; coming in with Kent 80/5 he managed the strike from 128/8 until he was out for 190 with the score on 294.

At the 2021 T20 finals day, his 47 not out from 28 balls proved decisive in the semi-final victory against Sussex, and though his contributions in the final were less spectacular, he was part of the victorious Kent team 14 years after hitting the winning runs in the 2007 final. Stevens' last game for Kent was in the One-Day Cup final where his team beat Lancashire by 21 runs at Trent Bridge with Stevens scoring 33 from 31 balls. Kent presented Stevens with a framed team shirt with his shirt number 3 which they retired to mark his long career with the club.

His best bowling figures are 8 for 75, against Leicestershire in 2017. He won Kent's Player of the Year award in 2005, 2010, 2013, 2019, 2020 and 2021.

== Career best performances ==
	Batting				Bowling (innings)			
	Score	Fixture	Venue	Season	Figures	Fixture	Venue	Season
First-class	237	Kent v Yorkshire	Leeds	2019	8/75	Kent v Leicestershire	Canterbury	2017
List A	147	Kent v Glamorgan	Swansea	2017	6/25	Kent Spitfires v Surrey	Beckenham	2018
Twenty20	90	Kent Spitfires v Surrey	The Oval	2015	4/14	Kent Spitfires v Essex Eagles	Chelmsford	2007
