= Melt van Schoor =

South African-born Namibian cricketer (born 1967)

Personal information
- Full name: Melt van Schoor
- Born: 7 April 1967 (age 59); Mowbray, Cape Town, South Africa
- Batting: Right-handed
- Role: Wicket-keeper
- Relatives: Danie van Schoor (son); Raymond van Schoor (son)

International information
- National side: Namibia (1990–2011)
- ODI debut (cap 12): 16 February 2003 v Pakistan
- Last ODI: 3 March 2003 v Netherlands

Career statistics
Competition	ODI	FC	LA
Matches	5	2	18
Runs scored	58	0	148
Batting average	14.50	0.00	11.38
100s/50s	0/0	0/0	0/0
Top score	24	0	24
Catches/stumpings	4/0	3/0	20/0
- Source: ESPNcricinfo, 22 June 2017

Melt van Schoor (born 8 December 1967) is a South Africa-born Namibian cricketer. He is a right-handed batsman and a wicketkeeper. He played in the ICC Trophy between 1994 and 2001, and has played List A cricket since then. He also played five One Day Internationals in the World Cup in 2003. Van Schoor generally occupies the lower order, but performs well in this position.

Melt van Schoor is the brother of fellow cricketer Ian van Schoor.

In February 2020, he was named in Namibia's squad for the Over-50s Cricket World Cup in South Africa. However, the tournament was cancelled during the third round of matches due to the coronavirus pandemic.
