= Damian Brandy =

English cricketer (born 1981)

Personal information
- Full name: Damian Gareth Brandy
- Born: 14 September 1981 (age 45); Highgate, London, England
- Batting: Right-handed
- Bowling: Right-arm medium

Domestic team information
- Years: Team
- 2005–2008: Cambridgeshire
- 2002–2004: Leicestershire
- 2002: Leicestershire Cricket Board
- 2000: Essex Cricket Board

Career statistics
Competition	FC	LA	T20
Matches	9	6	4
Runs scored	187	90	27
Batting average	15.58	18.00	27.00
100s/50s	–/1	–/–	–/–
Top score	52	35	13
Balls bowled	153	12	–
Wickets	4	–	–
Bowling average	43.00	–	–
5 wickets in innings	–	–	–
10 wickets in match	–	–	–
Best bowling	2/11	–	–
Catches/stumpings	3/–	–/–	2/–
- Source: Cricinfo, 4 March 2012

Damian Gareth Brandy (born 14 September 1981) is an English former cricketer. Brandy is a right-handed batsman who bowls right-arm medium pace. He was born at Highgate, London.

Brandy made his debut in county cricket for the Essex Cricket Board in the 2000 MCCA Knockout Trophy against Suffolk, in what was his only appearance for the team. He later made a single appearance in the 2002 MCCA Knockout Trophy for the Leicestershire Cricket Board against the Nottinghamshire Cricket Board.

In that same season, Brandy made his debut for Leicestershire in a List A match against Somerset in the 2002 Norwich Union League. He also made his first-class debut in that season against the same opponents in the County Championship. He made one further List A and first-class match for the county in that season. In 2003, Brandy made just a single List A appearance against Surrey in the 2003 National League, though he appeared more regularly in first-class cricket, making six appearances. It was in this season that he made his Twenty20 debut in the Twenty20 Cup against Lancashire, with Brandy playing two further matches in that season's competition against Nottinghamshire and Derbyshire. Brandy found himself further on the fringes of the Leicestershire team in 2004, making just a single first-class appearance against Hampshire in the County Championship, as well as a single Twenty20 appearance against Surrey. He also featured in three List A matches in the totesport League, with his final appearance in that format coming against Worcestershire. Brandy was released by Leicestershire at the end of the 2004 season, along with George Walker and Darren Stevens. During his spell at Leicestershire, Brandy made nine first-class appearances, scoring 187 runs at an average of 15.58, with a high score of 52. This score was his only half century and came against Kent in 2003. With the ball, he took 4 wickets at a bowling average of 43.00, with best figures of 2/11. In List A cricket, he scored 90 runs at an average of 18.00, with a high score of 35, while in Twenty20 cricket he scored 27 runs with a high score of 13.

He joined Cambridgeshire for the 2005 season, making his debut in Minor counties cricket against Suffolk in the MCCA Knockout Trophy. His debut in the Minor Counties Championship also came in that season against Bedfordshire. He played for Cambridgeshire from 2005 to 2008, making thirteen Minor Counties Championship appearances and the same number of appearances in the MCCA Knockout Trophy. Brandy now edits a magazine called Middle East Cricket in Dubai.
