= 2011 Stanbic Bank 20 Series =

2011–12 Stanbic Bank 20 Series
- Administrator(s): Zimbabwe Cricket
- Cricket format: Twenty20
- Tournament format(s): Group stage and knockout
- Champions: Mountaineers (1st title)
- Participants: 5
- Matches: 14
- Player of the series: Peter Trego (Mashonaland Eagles)
- Most runs: 293 – Chris Gayle (Matabeleland Tuskers)
- Most wickets: 11 – Shingirai Masakadza (Mountaineers)
- Official website: Stanbic Bank 20 Series 2011/12

The 2011 Stanbic Bank 20 Series was a Twenty20 cricket competition held in Zimbabwe from 25 November – 4 December 2011. It was the third edition of the Stanbic Bank 20 Series, the premier Twenty20 cricket competition in Zimbabwe. It was won by Mountaineers who defeated Mashonaland Eagles by 27 runs in a thrilling final, in which they defended 142 and dismissed the Eagles for 115 mostly due to the leading wicket-taker of the tournament, Shingirai Masakadza. Mountaineers were particularly strong throughout the tournament, and played some high standard of cricket, that saw them first finish top of the group with 3 wins of 4 matches, then overhaul the heavily favored Matabeleland Tuskers in the 1st Semi at Harare. It was the same time that Mashonaland Eagles the eventual losing finalists, defeated the favored Mid West Rhinos by 53 runs coming from the brink of elimination to earn the playoff final berth against Matabeleland Tuskers. Southern Rocks had a forgettable tournament, finishing in last place in the group stage. In the playoff final, Eagles scored 207/7 mostly due to Essex and Netherlands all-rounder Ryan ten Doeschate's fiery 121* off 58 balls, and Tuskers were defeated by 23 runs (Duckworth/Lewis Method) despite a blowing half-century from the tournament's highest run-scorer Chris Gayle and another blazing one by Steven Trenchard.

Perhaps the highlight of the season was the signing of international stars Chris Gayle (Matabeleland Tuskers), Dirk Nannes (Mountaineers), and Shaun Tait (Mid West Rhinos) in the tournament. Other high-profile stars included Rory Hamilton-Brown (Mashonaland Eagles), Peter Trego (Mashonaland Eagles), Ryan ten Doeschate (Mashonaland Eagles), and Andrew Hall (Mashonaland Eagles).

Players like Gayle and Nannes had agreed to play in the event for less money than they demand elsewhere. Gayle hoped that his first season in Zimbabwe is a season to remember, while Nannes looked forward to bowl in a country where he had never been before. Tait selected the Mid West Rhinos franchise because it was coached by a fellow Australian and former fast bowler Jason Gillespie. Both Gayle and Nannes were teammates for Royal Challengers Bangalore in the 2011 Indian Premier League (IPL 4) and 2011 Champions League Twenty20.

Zimbabwe Cricket was bullish ahead of the event saying that it will face minimal losses in hosting its popular Twenty20 tournament and they were very close to making it a sustainable, profitable tournament, according to ZC Managing Director, Ozias Bvute.

Chris Gayle's first season in Zimbabwe indeed was a season to remember as he scored 293 runs with a highest score of 109*. He also won the best batsman award. Mountaineers' Shingirai Masakadza was the highest wicket-taker with 11 wickets. He was also the bowler of the series. Peter Trego of the Eagles was declared the Man of the Series for his 166 runs and 9 wickets.

The steady upward shift in the standard of cricket in Zimbabwe, the efficiency of the organisation and the standard of play during this tournament in particular, should serve as a sharp warning to the rest of the cricketing community of the dangers that Zimbabwe, as a Test nation, may pose in a decade's time.

== Fixtures and results ==
=== Group stage ===
Team	Pld	W	L	T	N/R	Pts	Net R/R
Mountaineers	4	3	1	0	0	14	+0.736
Matabeleland Tuskers	4	3	1	0	0	13	+0.862
Mid West Rhinos	4	2	1	0	1	10	+0.080
Mashonaland Eagles	4	1	3	0	0	5	+0.141
Southern Rocks	4	0	3	0	1	2	−2.368

=== 1st Semi-Final ===
2 December
Scorecard

Matabeleland Tuskers; 167/6 (20 overs)	v	Mountaineers; 170/3 (19.2 overs)
Charles Coventry 45 (26); Prosper Utseya 2/23 (4 overs)		Hamilton Masakadza 80* (56); Chris Gayle 1/25 (4 overs)

Mountaineers won by 7 wickets
Harare Sports Club, Harare
Umpires: Langton Rusere and Russell Tiffin
Player of the match: Hamilton Masakadza (Mountaineers)

- Matabeleland Tuskers won the toss and chose to bat.

=== Playoff Final ===
3 December
Scorecard

Mashonaland Eagles; 207/7 (20 overs)	v	Matabeleland Tuskers; 162/3 (18 overs)
Ryan ten Doeschate 121* (58); Glen Querl 2/25 (3 overs)		Steven Trenchard 56* (31); Rory Hamilton-Brown 1/20 (2 overs)

Mashonaland Eagles won by 23 runs (D/L method)
Harare Sports Club, Harare
Umpires: Owen Chirombe and Russell Tiffin
Player of the match: Ryan ten Doeschate (Mashonaland Eagles)

- Matabeleland Tuskers won the toss and chose to field.

=== Final ===
4 December
Scorecard

Mountaineers; 142/6 (20 overs)	v	Mashonaland Eagles; 115 (18.1 overs)
Phil Mustard 56 (31); Rory Hamilton-Brown 2/14 (3 overs)		Stuart Matsikenyeri 34 (31); Shingirai Masakadza 3/21 (3.1 overs)

Mountaineers won by 27 runs
Harare Sports Club, Harare
Umpires: Owen Chirombe and Russell Tiffin
Player of the match: Chris Harris (Mountaineers)

- Matabeleland Tuskers won the toss and chose to bat.
- Mountaineers won the 2011/12 Stanbic Bank 20 Series
- Player of the match: (New Zealand) Chris Harris (Mountaineers)
- Player of the series: (England) Peter Trego (Mashonaland Eagles)
- Batsman of the series: (Jamaica) Chris Gayle (Matabeleland Tuskers)
- Bowler of the series: (Zimbabwe) Shingirai Masakadza (Mountaineers)
