= 2007–08 Logan Cup =

- Administrator: Zimbabwe Cricket
- Cricket format: First-class cricket (4 days)
- Tournament format: League system
- Champions: Northerns (1st title)
- Participants: 5
- Matches: 10
- Most runs: 371 – Hamilton Masakadza (Easterns)
- Most wickets: 24 – Brighton Mugochi (Centrals)

The 2007–08 Logan Cup was a first-class cricket competition held in Zimbabwe from 17 April 2008 – 17 May 2008. It was won by Northerns, who won all four of their matches to top the table with 75 points.

== Points table ==
Team	Pld	W	L	D	T	Bat	Bwl	Pts	Net R/R
Northerns	4	4	0	0	0	19	16	75	+0.689
Easterns	4	3	1	0	0	14	16	60	+0.651
Southerns	4	1	2	1	0	10	16	42	–0.094
Centrals	4	1	2	1	0	9	15	38	–0.632
Westerns	4	0	4	0	0	4	14	18	–0.407
Source:CricketArchive
