= Njabulo Ncube =

Zimbabwean cricketer (born 1989)

Personal information
- Full name: Njabulo Ncube
- Born: 14 October 1989 (age 37); Bulawayo, Zimbabwe
- Batting: Right-handed
- Bowling: Right-arm fast-medium
- Role: Bowler

International information
- National side: Zimbabwe
- Only Test: 1 November 2011 v New Zealand
- ODI debut: 25 October 2011 v New Zealand
- Last ODI: 25 October 2011 v New Zealand

Domestic team information
- Years: Team
- 2008–09: Westerns
- 2009–2010: Mountaineers
- 2010–present: Matabeleland Tuskers

Career statistics
| Competition | Tests | ODI | FC | LA |
|---|---|---|---|---|
| Matches | 1 | 1 | 49 | 30 |
| Runs scored | 17 | 0 | 343 | 24 |
| Batting average | 8.50 | – | 8.57 | 8.00 |
| 100s/50s | 0/0 | 0/0 | 0/0 | 0/0 |
| Top score | 14 | 0* | 29 | 15* |
| Balls bowled | 210 | 53 | 7,016 | 1,085 |
| Wickets | 1 | 3 | 112 | 30 |
| Bowling average | 121.00 | 23.00 | 30.71 | 28.63 |
| 5 wickets in innings | 0 | 0 | 2 | 2 |
| 10 wickets in match | 0 | 0 | 0 | 0 |
| Best bowling | 1/80 | 3/69 | 7/35 | 5/35 |
| Catches/stumpings | 1/0 | 0/– | 16/- | 8/– |
- Source: Cricinfo, 19 February 2013

Njabulo Ncube (born 14 October 1989) is a Zimbabwean cricketer. He domestically represents the Matabeleland Tuskers, formerly the Westerns cricket team. He has represented Zimbabwe in one One-Day International. He considers Makhaya Ntini as his role model for his aggression and commitment to the game.

== Early years ==
Ncube first played cricket on the streets of Bulawayo's Gwabalanda township, going on to represent Milton High School before finding a place in the Western Under-19s and B teams, where impressive performances helped him find a place in the Zimbabwe Under-19 Cricket Team. He had represented Zimbabwe at the 2008 ICC Under-19 Cricket World Cup in Malaysia, where he took 1 wicket for 12 runs in 7 overs in the match against New Zealand Under-19s. He plays for Amakhosi Cricket Club in the club league in Zimbabwe.

== Domestic career ==
=== Westerns career ===
He spent a couple of seasons with the Matabeleland-based Westerns until the revamping of Zimbabwe's cricket structure in 2009. He made his First-class debut, List A debut and Twenty20 debut for them.

=== Move to Mountaineers ===
After the Zimbabwe's domestic structure was reconstructed, Ncube moved to Mountaineers in 2009, but the move was not successful, and returned to Matabeleland Tuskers in 2010. He currently plays domestic cricket for them.

== International career ==
=== ODI debut ===
He was selected for the New Zealand cricket team in Zimbabwe in 2011–12 ODI series.

After this, he made his ODI debut in the 3rd ODI where he took 3 wickets in his debut match. He became one of only eight Zimbabwean bowlers to take three or more wickets on debut. Zimbabwe won by 1 wicket in the penultimate ball of the innings as they recorded their highest ever successful run-chase.

=== Test debut ===
He made his Test cricket debut against New Zealand at Bulawayo on 1 November 2011. He took his maiden Test wicket with the dismissal of Ross Taylor, caught by the wicketkeeper Regis Chakabva. While it was his first dismissal in this format, it was also Chakabva's first dismissal in Test cricket. It was Ncube who bowled economical overs, maintained disciplined line and lengths, and took most of the advantages of the conditions early on.

In July 2016 he was named in Zimbabwe's Test squad for their series against New Zealand.

== Bowling speed ==
Ncube normally bowls at a speed of 128–135 kmph. On his day he can bowl quick and naturally hit the deck bowling inswing cutters but has been working hard on his outswingers. However, now he bowls fine outswingers in tandem to his inswingers as he showed in this debut ODI and Test matches for Zimbabwe.
