= Johnson Marumisa =

Zimbabwean cricketer (born 1983)

Personal information
- Full name: Johnson Marumisa
- Born: 1 March 1983 (age 43); Harare, Zimbabwe
- Batting: Right-handed
- Bowling: Legbreak
- Role: Batsman

Domestic team information
- Years: Team
- 2003/04: Mashonaland
- 2004/05: Manicaland
- 2005/06: Masvingo
- 2006/07–2008/09: Easterns
- 2009/10–2010/11: Mountaineers

Career statistics
Competition	FC	LA	T20
Matches	25	26	10
Runs scored	1,246	296	46
Batting average	31.15	17.41	5.75
100s/50s	1/8	0/1	0/0
Top score	101	66	17
Catches/stumpings	29/–	8/–	4/–
- Source: Cricinfo, 4 October 2011

Johnson Marumisa (born 1 March 1983) is a Zimbabwean cricketer. He is a right-handed batsman and leg break bowler and a product of the CFX Academy, as well as a member of the Takashinga Cricket Club. As a batsman, he has proven to be a leading pinch-hitter among the present pool of Zimbabwean players. He has played for the Manicaland cricket team along with such players as Andy Flower and Guy Whittall. Also a first-class and List A cricketer with Mashonaland, he was selected in Zimbabwe's 2007 ICC World Twenty20 squad. From 2008 to 2009, he represented the Easterns in Twenty20 cricket before the Zimbabwean domestic circuit was revamped. Currently, Marumisa plays first-class and List A cricket with the Mountaineers cricket team.
