= Graeme Aldridge =

New Zealand cricketer

Personal information
- Full name: Graeme William Aldridge
- Born: 15 November 1977 (age 49); Christchurch, New Zealand
- Batting: Right-handed
- Bowling: Right-arm fast-medium

International information
- National side: New Zealand (2011)
- ODI debut (cap 164): 22 October 2011 v Zimbabwe
- Last ODI: 25 October 2011 v Zimbabwe
- Only T20I (cap 50): 17 October 2011 v Zimbabwe

Domestic team information
- Years: Team
- 1998/99–2014/15: Northern Districts

Career statistics
Competition	ODI	T20I	FC	LA
Matches	2	1	123	138
Runs scored	–	–	2,339	724
Batting average	–	–	19.82	16.83
100s/50s	–	–	0/5	0/1
Top score	–	–	75	50
Balls bowled	114	24	20,446	6,340
Wickets	1	1	364	185
Bowling average	98.00	45.00	28.29	27.71
5 wickets in innings	0	0	14	2
10 wickets in match	–	–	1	–
Best bowling	1/45	1/45	6/41	5/34
Catches/stumpings	0/–	1/–	47/–	31/–
- Source: Cricinfo, 9 October 2023

Graeme William Aldridge (born 15 November 1977) is a former New Zealand cricketer who played first class cricket for Northern Districts from 1998–99 to 2014–15. He represented New Zealand in one-day cricket in 2011.

Aldridge was born in Christchurch and attended Otumoetai College in Tauranga. A right-arm fast-medium bowler and useful lower-order batsman, he holds the New Zealand domestic List A wicket-taking record, with 178 from 131 matches. He also has the Northern Districts first-class record, with 355 wickets at an average of 28.31 from 119 matches. His best first-class innings figures were 6 for 41 against Canterbury in 2011–12; his best match figures were 11 for 145 (6 for 49 and 5 for 96) against Central Districts in 2009–10.

Aldridge played two One Day Internationals and one Twenty20 match against Zimbabwe in October 2011 during New Zealand's tour of Zimbabwe. He was the 50th T20I cap for New Zealand.

After retiring from playing, Aldridge was the coach of Northern Districts for three years before becoming national bowling support coach in 2023.
