= 2010 Stanbic Bank 20 Series (February) =

2009–10 Stanbic Bank 20 Series
- Administrator: Zimbabwe Cricket
- Cricket format: Twenty20
- Tournament format(s): Group stage and knockout
- Champions: Mountaineers (1st title)
- Participants: 6
- Matches: 17
- Player of the series: Hamilton Masakadza (Mountaineers)
- Most runs: 317 – Hamilton Masakadza (Mountaineers)
- Most wickets: 12 – Tony Palladino (Desert Vipers)

The 2010 Stanbic Bank 20 Series in February was a Twenty20 cricket competition held in Zimbabwe from 12–20 February 2010. It was won by the Mountaineers, who defeated the Mashonaland Eagles in the final by nine wickets.

The competition consisted of a round-robin group stage, followed directly by the final and third-place play-off. The Mashonaland Eagles topped the group stage, winning four of their five games, and faced the second-placed team, the Mountaineers in the final. The third-place play-off was contested between the teams finishing third and fourth in the group, the Desert Vipers and the Matabeleland Tuskers, both of which had won two matches, lost two, and had a match abandoned.

The tournament was the first contesting of the Stanbic Bank 20 Series to be played following a restructure of Zimbabwean cricket that resulted in five franchises, the Mashonaland Eagles, Matabeleland Tuskers, Mid West Rhinos, Mountaineers and Southern Rocks. These five teams were joined by the Desert Vipers, a team representing Namibia. Hamilton Masakadza of the Mountaineers finished the competition with the most runs, amassing 317 at an average of 63.40, while Tony Palladino of the visiting Desert Vipers claimed the most wickets, taking 12 at an average of 9.66. Masakadza was named as player of the series, and also batsman of the series, and Palladino was chosen as bowler of the series. Masakadza scored the only century of the competition, passing 100 during the Mountaineers group match against the Southern Rocks.

Following the conclusion of the tournament, Zimbabwe Cricket declared themselves delighted, after the final drew a crowd of approximately 7,500, which was described as "the biggest for a domestic match in living memory." This turnout was significantly greater than the average attendance for cricket in the preceding years which rarely passed 1,000.

== Fixtures and results ==
=== Group stage ===
Team	Pld	W	L	T	N/R	Pts	Net R/R
Mashonaland Eagles	5	4	1	0	0	8	+1.066
Mountaineers	5	3	2	0	0	6	–0.407
Desert Vipers	5	2	2	0	1	5	+0.329
Matabeleland Tuskers	5	2	2	0	1	5	−0.610
Mid West Rhinos	5	2	3	0	0	4	−0.227
Southern Rocks	5	1	4	0	0	2	−0.242
Source:CricketArchive

=== Knockout stage ===
==== Third-place play-off ====
20 February
Scorecard

Desert Vipers; 126/7 (20 overs)	v	Matabeleland Tuskers; 91 (18.3 overs)
Raymond van Schoor 46 (53); Chris Mpofu 2/26 (4 overs)		Tawanda Mupariwa 31 (16); Louis Klazinga 2/13 (4 overs)

Desert Vipers won by 35 runs
Harare Sports Club, Harare
Umpires: Owen Chirombe and Jeremiah Matibiri
Player of the match: Raymond van Schoor (Vipers)

- Desert Vipers won the toss and elected to bat.

==== Final ====
20 February
Scorecard

Mashonaland Eagles; 105 (18.4 overs)	v	Mountaineers; 106/1 (17.3 overs)
Elton Chigumbura 20 (17); Greg Smith 3/11 (2.4 overs)		Hamilton Masakadza 64* (55); Douglas Hondo 1/19 (4 overs)

Mountaineers won by 9 wickets
Harare Sports Club, Harare
Umpires: Ian Robinson and Russell Tiffin
Player of the match: Prosper Utseya (Mountaineers)

- Mountaineers won the toss and elected to field.
