= George Walker (cricketer, born 1984) =

English cricketer

Personal information
- Full name: George William Walker
- Born: 12 May 1984 (age 42); Norwich, Norfolk, England
- Batting: Left-handed
- Bowling: Slow left-arm orthodox

Domestic team information
- Years: Team
- 2009: Leicestershire
- 2005–present: Norfolk
- 2004: Loughborough UCCE
- 2002–2003: Leicestershire
- 2000: Norfolk

Career statistics
Competition	First-class
Matches	7
Runs scored	95
Batting average	13.57
100s/50s	–/–
Top score	37*
Balls bowled	594
Wickets	3
Bowling average	116.33
5 wickets in innings	–
10 wickets in match	–
Best bowling	1/75
Catches/stumpings	2/–
- Source: Cricinfo, 3 March 2012

George William Walker (born 12 May 1984) is an English cricketer. Walker is a left-handed batsman who bowls slow left-arm orthodox. He was born at Norwich, Norfolk.

Walker made his debut in county cricket for Norfolk against Suffolk in the 2000 Minor Counties Championship. He later joined Leicestershire, making his first-class debut for the county against Kent in the 2002 County Championship. That was his only first-class appearance in that season, and in the following season he made two further first-class appearances against Nottinghamshire and Sussex. He struggled in his three first-class appearances up to then for the county, taking just a single wicket. He was released by Leicestershire at the end of the 2004 season, along with Damian Brandy and Darren Stevens. While studying at Loughborough University, Walker made a single first-class appearance in 2004 for Loughborough UCCE against Sussex at the County Ground, Hove.

Having not secured any first-class contracts with other county sides, Walker returned to Minor counties cricket with Norfolk in 2005. His MCCA Knockout Trophy debut came four seasons later in 2008, against Hertfordshire. Following an injury to off-spinner Jigar Naik during the 2009 season, Walker was invited back to Leicestershire as cover for Naik, and after taking five wickets for the Leicestershire Seconds, he was selected to play for the team in their County Championship match against Derbyshire. He made two further first-class appearances in that season, against Middlesex and Essex, though again he had little success, scoring 21 runs at an average of 5.25, while taking two wickets at an expensive bowling average of 79.50. Walker wasn't offered any long-term deal by Leicestershire and once again returned to Minor counties cricket with Norfolk, who he has appeared for to date in 28 Minor Counties Championship and 19 MCCA Knockout Trophy matches.
