= 2006–07 Logan Cup =

- Administrator: Zimbabwe Cricket
- Cricket format: First-class cricket (4 days)
- Tournament format: League system
- Champions: Easterns (1st title)
- Participants: 6
- Matches: 14
- Most runs: 568 – Tino Mawoyo (Easterns)
- Most wickets: 33 – Keith Dabengwa (Westerns)

The 2006–07 Logan Cup was a first-class cricket competition held in Zimbabwe from 12 April 2007 to 13 May 2007. It was won by Easterns, who remained unbeaten in their five matches to top the table with 44 points. Following the cancellation of the 2005–06 competition, Zimbabwe Cricket reformatted the Logan Cup, including the addition of a Kenya Select side. However, the tournament received considerable negative publicity due to very poor organization: firstly, no fixture list was published, and, later scorecards and statistics were unavailable, prompting concern that the matches could lose their first-class status since the International Cricket Council (ICC) had not been given the appropriate information.

It was suggested by Steven Price, writing for Cricinfo, that the tournament was nothing more than an exercise in "ticking the boxes" for Zimbabwe Cricket. Given the competition was played almost entirely out of the public eye, with no advertising and very little support, Price put forward the view that the competition was played primarily to meet the ICC's criteria for Zimbabwe's return to Test cricket; specifically, "that they had a fully functioning domestic programme". By contrast, Cricket Kenya, who had entered a representative side into the competition, provided the majority of information to the statisticians and general public on an almost daily basis.

== Points table ==
Team	Pld	W	L	D	Pts
Easterns	5	4	0	1	44
Westerns	5	3	2	0	30
Centrals	5	2	2	1	24
Southerns	4	1	2	1	14
Northerns	5	0	2	3	12
Kenya Select	4	0	2	2	8
Source:CricketArchive
