= Steven Trenchard =

South African-born Zimbabwean cricketer (born 1983)

Personal information
- Full name: Steven Montague Trenchard
- Born: August 12, 1983 (age 43); Johannesburg, Transvaal, South Africa

Domestic team information
- Years: Team
- 2010/11–2011/12: Matabeleland Tuskers
- 2012/13–2014/15: Mid West Rhinos

Career statistics
Competition	FC	List A	T20
Matches	28	31	17
Runs scored	1,138	290	144
Batting average	32.51	13.18	24.00
100s/50s	2/6	0/1	0/1
Top score	124	60	56*
Balls bowled	336	71	–
Wickets	5	1	–
Bowling average	43.80	75.00	–
5 wickets in innings	0	0	–
10 wickets in match	–	–	–
Best bowling	2/29	1/11	–
Catches/stumpings	29/–	12/–	10/–
- Source: Cricinfo, 25 January 2018

Steven Montague Trenchard (born 12 August 1983) is a South African-born Zimbabwean cricketer. He has played first-class cricket for Matabeleland Tuskers and Mid West Rhinos. He made his first-class cricket debut for Matabeleland Tuskers in the 2010–11 season.

He previously played club cricket for Wimbledon in the Surrey Championship Premier Division before joining the Matabeleland Tuskers franchise in the 2010–11 season.
