= Raymond van Schoor =

Namibian cricketer (1990–2015)

Personal information
- Full name: Raymond van Schoor
- Born: 23 May 1990; Windhoek, Namibia
- Died: 20 November 2015 (aged 25); Windhoek, Namibia
- Batting: Right-handed
- Bowling: Right-arm off break
- Role: Wicket-keeper
- Relatives: Melt van Schoor (father); Danie van Schoor (brother)

International information
- National side: Namibia (2007–2015)

Career statistics
Competition	FC	LA	T20
Matches	92	103	70
Runs scored	4,303	2,618	1,550
Batting average	27.40	29.08	29.24
100s/50s	5/20	0/18	0/7
Top score	157	93*	79*
Balls bowled	2,033	536	199
Wickets	28	14	11
Bowling average	46.85	32.85	21.72
5 wickets in innings	0	0	0
10 wickets in match	0	0	0
Best bowling	3/58	4/34	2/11
Catches/stumpings	161/6	64/7	30/5
- Source: ESPN Cricinfo, 21 November 2015

Raymond van Schoor (23 May 1990 – 20 November 2015) was a Namibian cricketer. He was a right-handed batsman and occasional wicketkeeper. He was Namibia's most capped cricketer, making more than 200 appearances.

Van Schoor made his first-class and List A debut for Namibia in October 2007, aged seventeen. As an international, he represented Namibia in the ICC Intercontinental Cup, the World Cricket League, and the ICC World Twenty20 Qualifier. He also played with the Namibian teams that participated in the CSA Provincial Competitions in South Africa and the Stanbic Bank 20 Series in Zimbabwe. He appeared five times for Namibia Under-19s in the 2008 ICC Under-19 Cricket World Cup.

Van Schoor captained Namibia 40 times, and he was named Cricket Namibia's cricketer of the year in 2012. He also led the team at Under-15 international level.

He was the son of former Namibia international wicket-keeper Melt van Schoor.

Van Schoor collapsed while batting in a CSA Provincial 50 Over Challenge match against Free State at Wanderers Cricket Ground on 15 November 2015; he was admitted to hospital having suffered a stroke. He died on 20 November 2015 at the age of 25.

== See also ==
- List of fatalities while playing cricket
