= 2008–09 Logan Cup =

- Administrator: Zimbabwe Cricket
- Cricket format: First-class cricket (4 days)
- Tournament format: League system
- Champions: Easterns (2nd title)
- Participants: 4
- Matches: 12
- Most runs: 503 – Malcolm Waller (Centrals)
- Most wickets: 30 – Prosper Utseya (Easterns)

The 2008–09 Logan Cup was a first-class cricket competition held in Zimbabwe from 26 March 2009 – 8 May 2009. It was won by Easterns, who remained unbeaten in the competition, and topped the table with 93 points, winning five of their six matches.

== Points table ==
Team	Pld	W	L	D	T	Bat	Bwl	Pts	Net R/R
Easterns	6	5	0	1	0	13	24	93	+0.075
Northerns	6	4	2	0	0	13	24	77	+0.880
Centrals	6	1	3	2	0	10	19	45	–0.379
Westerns	6	0	5	1	0	5	20	31	–0.556
Source:CricketArchive
