= Andy McKay =

New Zealand cricketer (born 1980)

Personal information
- Full name: Andrew John McKay
- Born: 17 April 1980 (age 46); Auckland, New Zealand
- Height: 1.88 m (6 ft 2 in)
- Batting: Right-handed
- Bowling: Left-arm fast medium
- Role: Bowler

International information
- National side: New Zealand (2010–2012)
- Only Test (cap 249): 20 November 2010 v India
- ODI debut (cap 159): 5 February 2010 v Bangladesh
- Last ODI: 3 March 2012 v South Africa
- T20I debut (cap 43): 22 May 2010 v Sri Lanka
- Last T20I: 23 May 2010 v Sri Lanka

Domestic team information
- Years: Team
- 2002/03–2008/09: Auckland
- 2009/10–2014/15: Wellington

Career statistics
Competition	Test	ODI	FC	LA
Matches	1	19	57	52
Runs scored	25	12	529	87
Batting average	25.00	–	14.29	8.70
100s/50s	0/0	0/0	0/0	0/0
Top score	20*	4*	36*	24*
Balls bowled	120	926	10,474	2,214
Wickets	1	27	136	84
Bowling average	120.00	29.62	31.88	26.35
5 wickets in innings	0	0	2	1
10 wickets in match	0	0	0	0
Best bowling	1/120	4/53	5/54	5/50
Catches/stumpings	0/–	3/–	5/–	11/–
- Source: ESPNcricinfo, 11 January 2019

Andrew John McKay (born 17 April 1980) is a former New Zealand cricketer who played for the Wellington Firebirds in the State Championship, having moved from the Auckland Aces for the 2009–10 season. He was born in Auckland.

In June 2015 McKay announced his retirement from all forms of cricket.

== International career ==
Mckay made his One Day International (ODI) debut at Napier for New Zealand, against Bangladesh, on 5 February 2010.

Mckay made his international Test debut in what was to be his only test at Nagpur for New Zealand, against India, on 20 November 2010 and took the prize wicket of The Master – Sachin Tendulkar as his 1st International Test wicket.

== See also ==
- One-Test wonder
