= Centrals cricket team =

Centrals
Team information
- Established: 2006
- Last match: 2009
- Home venue: Kwekwe Sports Club

The Centrals cricket team was a former first-class cricket team in Zimbabwe. They competed in the Logan Cup from 2006 to 2009. The club played their home matches at the Kwekwe Sports Club, in Kwekwe in the Midlands province.

== First-class record ==
Season	Position	Leading run-scorer	Runs	Leading wicket-taker	Wickets
2006–07	3rd	Erick Chauluka	203	Ed Rainsford	21
2007–08	4th	Erick Chauluka	283	Brighton Mugochi	24
2008–09	3rd	Malcolm Waller	503	Tafadzwa Kamungozi	17
