= Southerns cricket team =

Zimbabwean cricket team

Southerns
Team information
- Established: 2006
- Last match: 2008
- Home venue: Masvingo Sports Club

The Southerns cricket team was a first-class cricket team in Zimbabwe. They competed in the Logan Cup from 2006 to 2008. The club played their home matches at the Masvingo Sports Club, in Masvingo, the capital of Masvingo Province.

== First-class record ==
Season	Position	Leading run-scorer	Runs	Leading wicket-taker	Wickets
2006–07	4th	Terry Duffin	287	Gary Brent	17
2007–08	3rd	Robertson Chinyengetere	241	Tafadzwa Kamungozi	19
