= Northerns cricket team (Zimbabwe) =

Zimbabwean first-class cricket team

Northerns
Team information
- Established: 2006
- Last match: 2009
- Home venue: Harare Sports Club; Alexandra Sports Club

The Northerns cricket team was a former first-class cricket team in Zimbabwe. Established in 2006, they competed in the Logan Cup from 2006 to 2009. The club mostly played their home matches at the Harare Sports Club, with some hosted at the Alexandra Sports Club, both venues located in the Zimbabwean capital Harare.

== First-class record ==
Season	Position	Leading run-scorer	Runs	Leading wicket-taker	Wickets
2006–07	5th	Elton Chigumbura	339	Admire Manyumwa	12
2007–08	Champions	Brendan Taylor	288	Ray Price	22
2008–09	2nd	Elton Chigumbura	496	Ray Price	29
