= Easterns cricket team (Zimbabwe) =

Zimbabwean first-class cricket team

Easterns
Team information
- Established: 2006
- Last match: 2009
- Home venue: Mutare Sports Club

The Easterns cricket team was a first-class cricket team in Zimbabwe. The former team was established in 2006 and competed in the Logan Cup from 2006 to 2009. The club played their home matches at the Mutare Sports Club, in Mutare, Manicaland Province.

== First-class record ==
Season	Position	Leading run-scorer	Runs	Leading wicket-taker	Wickets
2006–07	Champions	Tinotenda Mawoyo	568	Timycen Maruma	31
2007–08	2nd	Hamilton Masakadza	371	Shingirai Masakadza	21
2008–09	Champions	Hamilton Masakadza	467	Prosper Utseya	30
