= Westerns cricket team =

Westerns
Team information
- Established: 2006
- Last match: 2009
- Home venue: Queens Sports Club

The Westerns cricket team was a first-class cricket team in Bulawayo, Zimbabwe. They competed in the Logan Cup from 2006 to 2009. The club played their home matches at the Queens Sports Club.

== First-class record ==
Season	Position	Leading run-scorer	Runs	Leading wicket-taker	Wickets
2006–07	2nd	Charles Coventry	293	Keith Dabengwa	33
2007–08	5th	Tafadzwa Ngulube	296	Tawanda Mupariwa	10
2008–09	4th	Charles Coventry	268	Christopher Mpofu, Tawanda Mupariwa	18
