= Throwback uniform =

Sports uniform which mimics an older uniform of the team

Argentina national football team jersey that paid tribute to the models worn in mid-1970s

Throwback uniforms, throwback jerseys, retro kits or heritage guernseys are sports uniforms styled to resemble the uniforms that a team wore in the past. One-time or limited-time retro uniforms are sometimes produced to be worn by teams in games, on special occasions such as anniversaries of significant events.

Throwback uniforms have proven popular in all major pro and college sports in North America, not only with fans, but with the teams' merchandising departments. Because the "authentic" uniforms (accurate reproductions) and less-authentic "replicas" had been so popular at retail, the professional leagues institutionalized throwbacks as "third jerseys". In some instances, teams will wear "fauxbacks", which are new retro-style uniforms harkening back to a time that predates the team itself. For example, though the Tampa Bay Rays first took the field in 1998, they have worn 1979-style uniforms on several occasions since introducing them in 2012, and have also worn pre-1998 jerseys of several defunct local minor league teams, including the Tampa Tarpons and Tampa Smokers.

== American football ==
=== National Football League ===
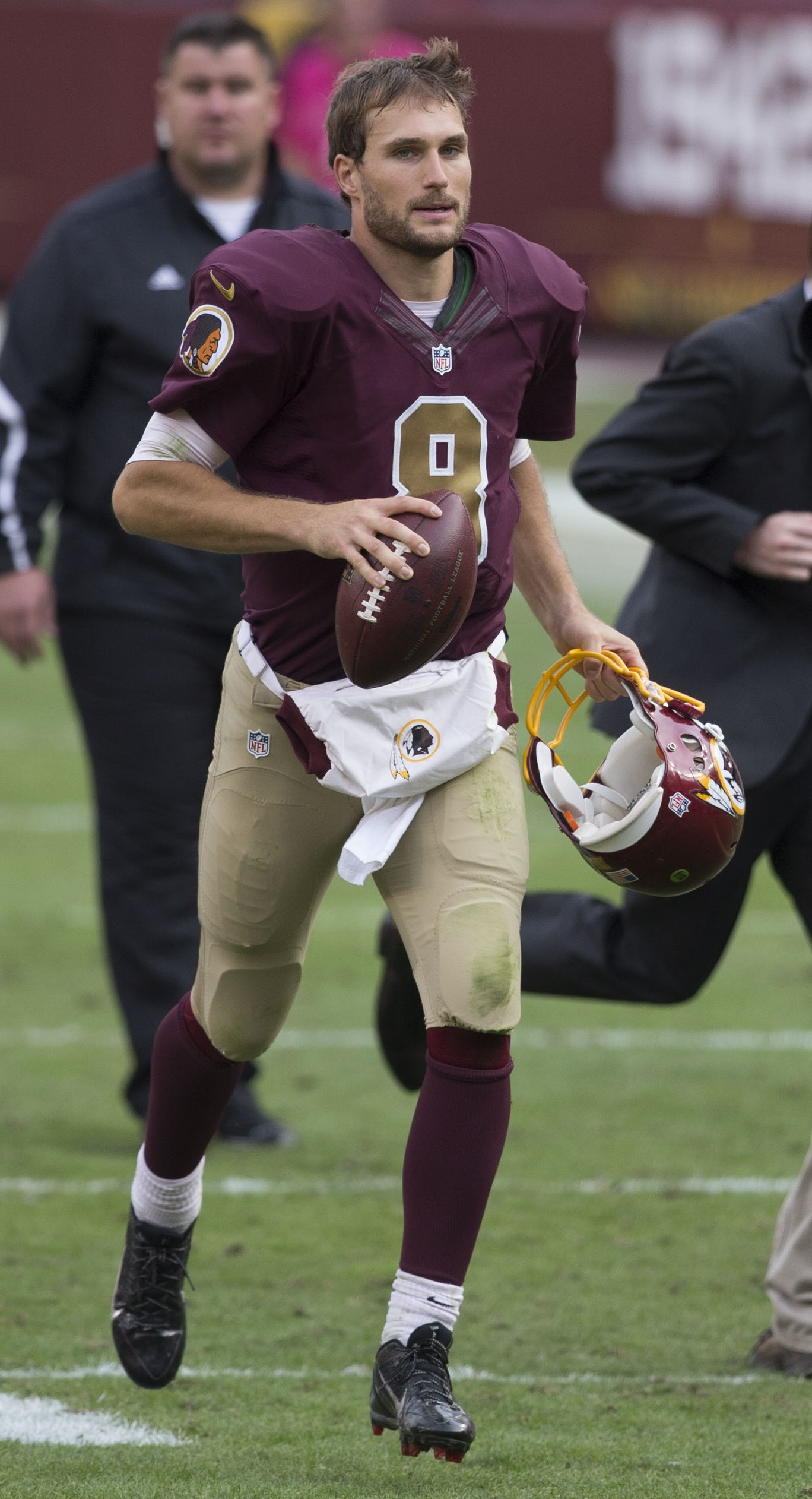
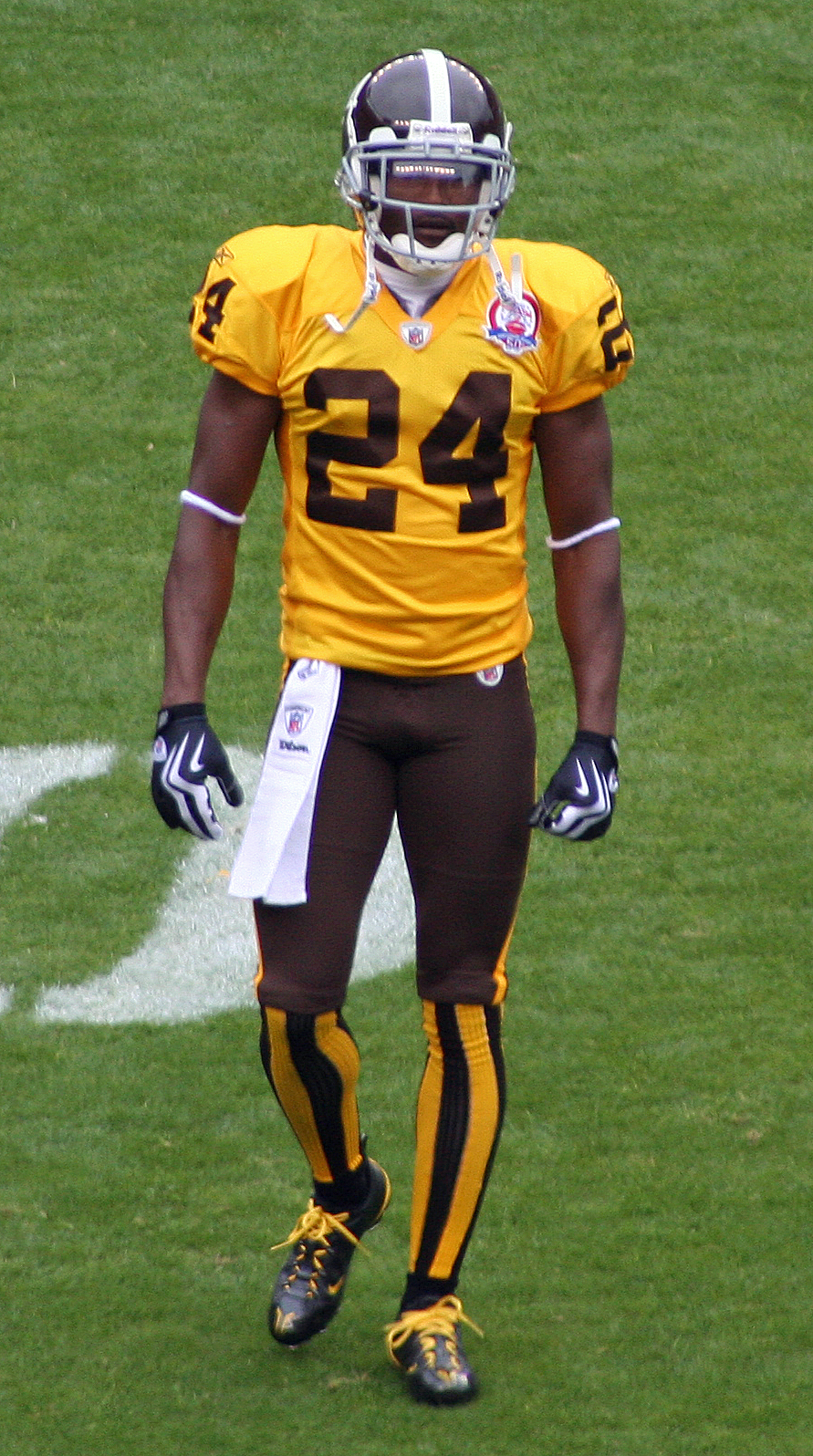
Two examples of NFL throwbacks (left): Quarterback Kirk Cousins wearing a Washington Redskins throwback uniform in 2015; (right): Champ Bailey wearing a Denver Broncos throwback uniform in 2009

Throwbacks were introduced in the NFL in 1991 at retail through the NFL Throwbacks Collection. The rights to produce the vintage apparel was limited to six apparel licensees, including Tiedman & Company Sportswear (exclusive to jerseys), Riddell (helmets), Starter (caps), Nutmeg Mills (sweatshirts), and DeLong (jackets). The first throwback uniform worn on the field in NFL was by the New York Jets in 1993. In 1994, to honor the NFL's 75th Anniversary, all 28 teams were allowed to wear modern versions of their old uniform styles.

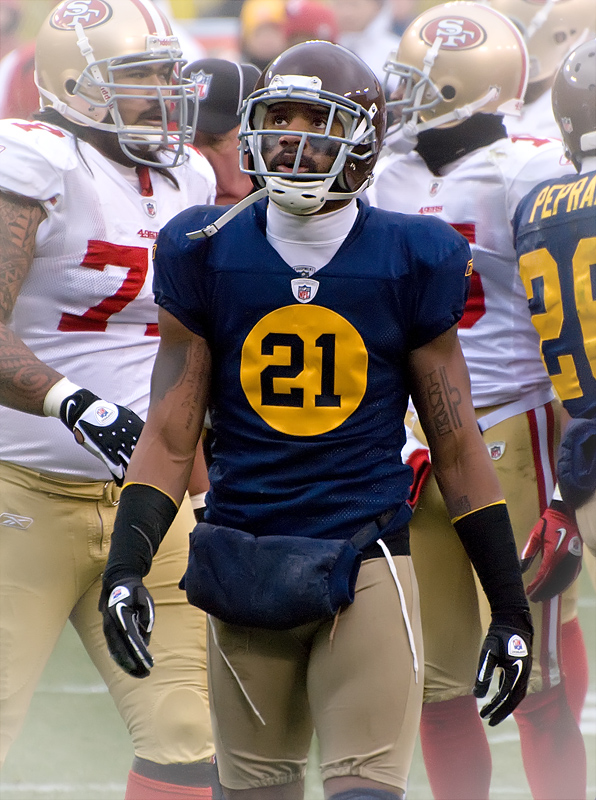
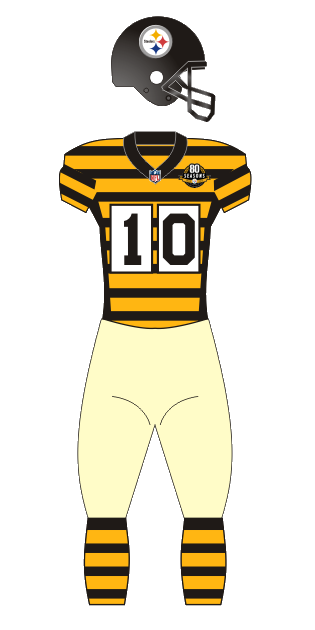
Fltr: Charles Woodson in the Green Bay Packers throwback uniform to honor the 1929 champions; Pittsburgh Steelers throwback for the 2012 season that paid tribute to the 1934 team

In their 80th anniversary, the Pittsburgh Steelers released a throwback uniform that honored the 1934 team. The uniform was a gold and black horizontal-striped jersey white squares containing the numbers. The throwback uniform was worn twice during the regular season. and drew major media attention. USA Today said that the Steelers looked like "bumblebee[s] in a Depression-era chain gang."

The NFL imposed a new rule for the 2013 season prohibiting the use of alternate colored helmets, eliminating many of the historically accurate throwback uniforms that had been in use up to that point. Teams are still allowed to use alternate decals (or no decals at all) for their throwbacks, but they must use them on the regular helmets. The one-helmet rule was repealed in 2022, allowing a number of teams to revisit classic uniforms from the past, such as the New York Giants' 1980s blue uniforms, and the Tennessee Titans' powder blue uniforms of their predecessors, the Houston Oilers.

=== College football ===
The Clemson University football team wore throwback uniforms in a single game during the 1995 season (October 7 vs. Georgia), in commemoration of the 100th anniversary of Clemson's football program. The uniforms resembled those of the 1939 Tigers, Clemson's first bowl team. In a continuation of the centennial celebration, the uniforms were also worn for one game the following season, a September 7, 1996, contest against Furman.

The Texas Longhorns college football team wore throwback uniforms for a single game during their 2005 national championship season as a way of honoring the past. The throwback jerseys were similar to jerseys worn during their 1963 National Championship season under Coach Darrell K Royal.

The University of Illinois football team wore throwback uniforms in a single game on September 6, 2008, in honor of the re-dedication of the renovated Memorial Stadium. The uniforms were styled after the 1960s-era uniforms worn by linebacker Dick Butkus.

The University of Virginia football team wore throwback uniforms in a single game on September 6, 2008, in honor of Virginia's teams from 1984 through 1993. The university's athletic department termed the game a "Retro Game" instead of using the term "throwback". The University of Virginia football team also wore throwback uniforms in a single game on September 29, 2012, in honor of Virginia's 1968 team and Frank Quayle.

The University of Florida football team wore throwback uniforms in a single game on September 30, 2006, in honor of Florida's teams in the 1960s.

The University of Washington football team wore throwback uniforms on September 29, 2007, to honor the 1960 national championship team. The throwback jerseys were dark blue with gold helmets. On October 16, 2021 the Huskies again wore throwback jerseys to honor the 30th anniversary of the 1991 national championship team.

For the 2009 and 2010 seasons, as part of Nike's Pro Combat program, several college football teams, including Ohio State and Oregon State wore throwback-inspired uniforms. In addition, for the 2009 playing of the "Holy War" rivalry against the University of Utah Utes (and also in the Las Vegas Bowl), the BYU Cougars donned royal blue throwback uniforms to commemorate the 25th anniversary of their 1984 National Championship season. These throwbacks, along with another alternate royal blue uniform, have been employed occasionally in subsequent seasons; since in 2014, they have been worn for the team's homecoming game each year.

The Kansas Jayhawks football team wore throwback uniforms on October 1, 2011, to honor the 50th anniversary of the 1961 KU football team, winners of the 1961 Bluebonnet Bowl, the program's first-ever bowl victory.

The University of Oregon football team wore throwback uniforms on October 8, 2016 to honor the 100th anniversary of the 1916 team, then known as the Webfoots. The jerseys were navy blue with yellow "Webfoots" lettering across the chest.

== Association football ==
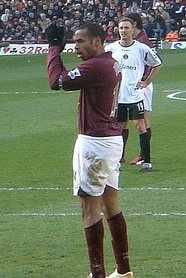
Thierry Henry wearing a redcurrant colored Arsenal jersey in 2006

'Retro shirts', as they are known in the United Kingdom, are also sometimes used in association football, albeit with modern fabrics. In 2005–06 Arsenal changed their home colours from their traditional red and white to a variant of maroon known as redcurrant as a commemoration of their final season at Highbury Stadium; this colour was supposedly the same shade the team had worn when they first played at Highbury in 1913, although later evidence suggested that Arsenal's main colour at that time was a more standard shade known as 'Garibaldi red'. Redcurrant, however, still played a part in their kits since; most recently on their yellow change kit featuring redcurrant shorts and pinstripes on the shirt and socks, between 2010 and 2012.

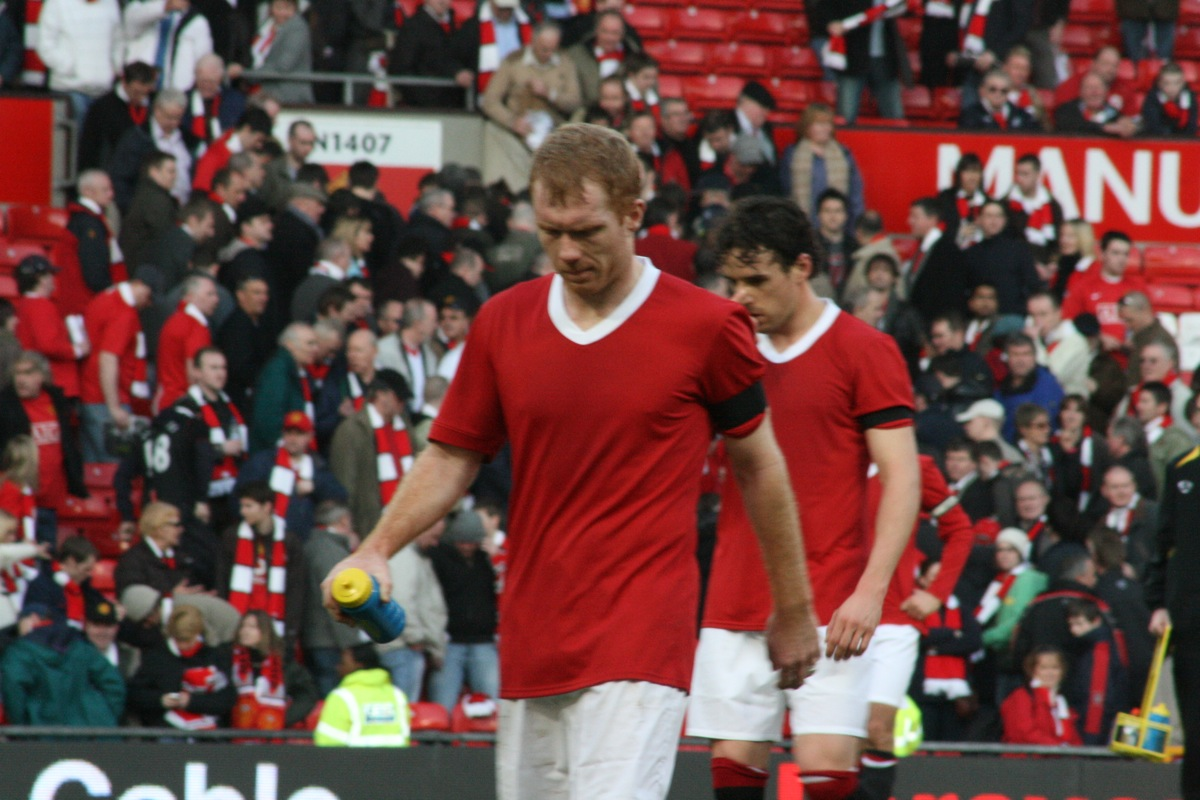
Paul Scholes and Owen Hargreaves in 2008, wearing 1958-style Manchester United kits to mark the 50th anniversary of the Munich air disaster

Manchester United wore several retro-style kits in the 1990s and 2000s, based on kits the worn by the club in the 1950s and '60s, as well as that worn by their first ever team, known then as Newton Heath. The Newton Heath-inspired kit was introduced in 1992 and worn for two seasons as a third kit. They wore a replica of their jersey from 1958 during the Manchester derby against Manchester City on February 10, 2008, at Old Trafford to mark the 50th anniversary of the Munich air disaster four days earlier. United were granted special dispensation by the Premier League to wear the one-off uniform which was devoid of logos and kit markings, and used the traditional "one to eleven" numbering scheme rather than using squad numbers. In a gesture of solidarity, Manchester City similarly removed the sponsor and manufacturer logos from their kits for the game, giving their shirts the same clean and empty look resembling the plain shirts of the 1950s when logos and team badges were not worn. However, they used the current season's kit style and chose not to go the whole distance in producing a retro-looking kit; retaining the club crest, competition sleeve patches, and the player name and squad number on the kit but added a black ribbon above the right breast. The previous season, 2006–07, United introduced a similar 1950s-style uniform to celebrate 50 years of the Busby Babes' first league championship. After their Champions League victory in 2008, United introduced another retro-style kit for 2008–09, celebrating the 40th anniversary of their first European Cup win. The club unveiled an all-blue third kit, based on the one worn against Benfica in the 1968 final.

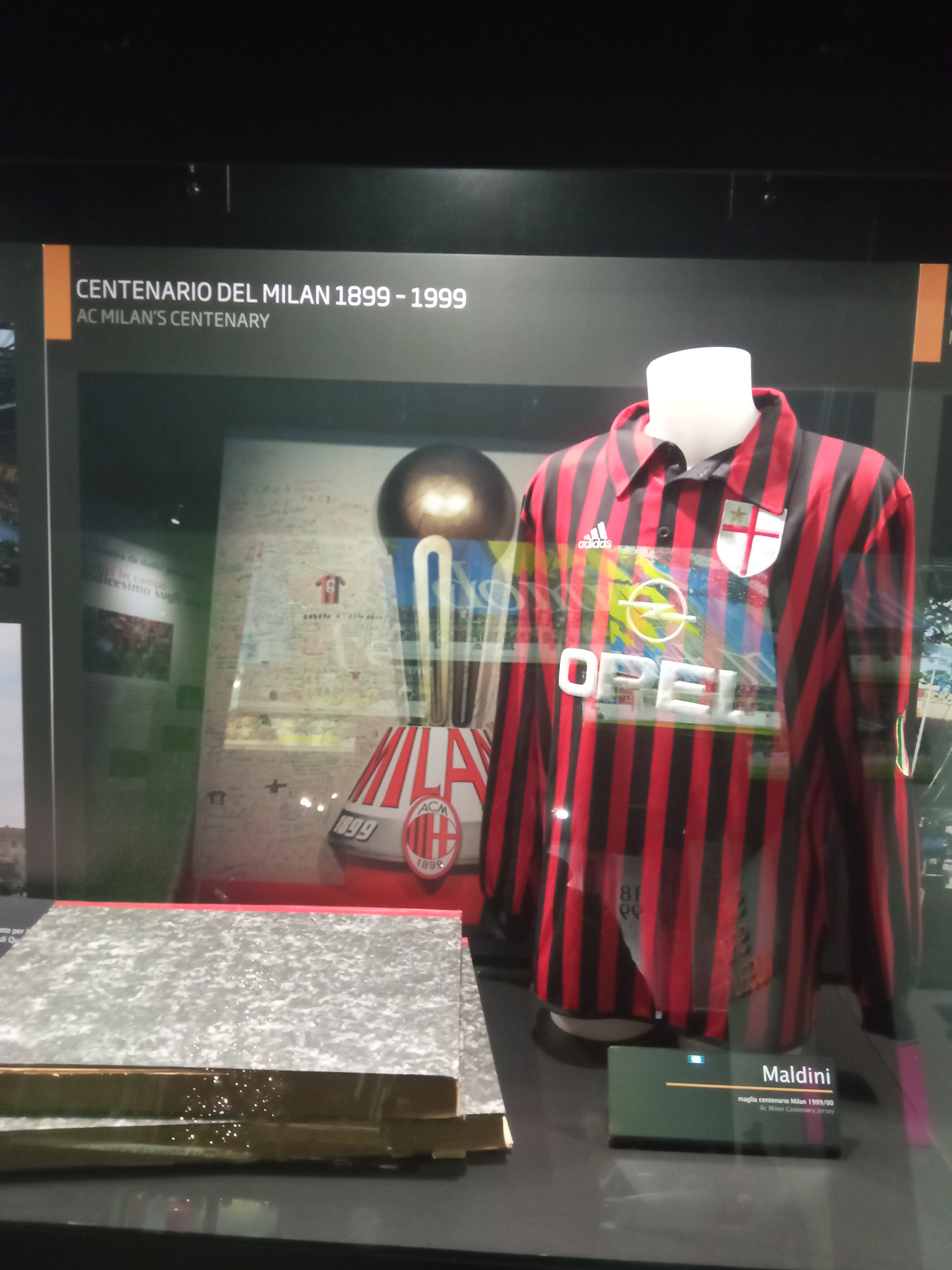
The shirt worn by Milan in the 1999–2000 season to celebrate the centenary of its foundation

In 1999, to celebrate the 100th anniversary of its foundation, A.C. Milan introduced a retro kit that was worn on several official matches by its players across the 1999–2000 season. The kit resembled the thin stripes design of the first silk shirts used by the club in the first decade of the 20th century.

More authentic reproductions of kits from the past have become popular fashion items, especially jerseys linked to successful or memorable teams. When France won the 1998 World Cup, their uniform was reminiscent of the design of the triumphant Euro 1984 team, with a red horizontal stripe and three thin horizontal stripes across the chest. Germany clearly based their 2018 World Cup design, featuring an unusual angular stripe pattern across the chest, on the shirt they wore while winning the trophy in 1990, although they failed to attain the same level of performance. Several other nations at that tournament had designs based on 'classics' of 20–30 years earlier.

When the United States men's soccer team took the field between 1999 and 2001, their plain white uniform with a thick V-neck collar looked reminiscent of the U.S. Soccer Federation's first uniform worn in 1916. A similar uniform (named "centennial jersey") was produced in 2013, complete with vintage crest, to mark the 100th anniversary of the USSF.

For the FIFA Centenary Match in 2004, France and Brazil played in kits resembling their first ever home kits. The Brazilian team wore white tops with blue trim, the original colours of their home kit, which was replaced in 1951 by today's yellow top with green trim after the 1950 World Cup defeat.

Replica of the model worn by Boca Juniors from 1907 to 1912. A new version of this shirt was launched in 2005 to commemorate the 100th anniversary of the club

To commemorate their 100th anniversary in 2005, Argentine club Boca Juniors released a series that consisted of five kits that paid tribute to some of the most iconic models in the history of the club. Those kits, manufactured by Nike, included new versions of the 1907 (the first blue and gold model worn by Boca but featuring a diagonal band) and 1981 (the only year Diego Maradona played for the club, winning the Metropolitano championship) models. Those kits were worn only in friendly pre-season tournaments such as Torneos de Verano (Argentina), while the rest of throwbacks were directly put up for sale.

Tottenham Hotspur celebrated their 125th anniversary during the 2007–08 season by launching a special kit in the club's early colours, sky blue and white, which were originally worn in 1885. The kit was worn for one game only, a 4–4 home draw to Aston Villa.

During the later stages of the 2011–12 season, financially troubled Scottish club Rangers wore their normal blue shirts on the pitch, but began selling and encouraging fans to wear throwback red and black striped scarves, the traditional colours of the burgh of Govan (where Ibrox Stadium is located) in an attempt to raise money. The club would be placed in administration, face liquidation and then sold to a new ownership group, and forced to re-apply for entry to the fourth (lowest) tier of the senior Scottish football system for the 2012–13 season. That year, Rangers and rivals Celtic both released retro-style simple kits with round collars and small sponsor logos to acknowledge historic anniversaries, despite being with different suppliers; however, Rangers' absence from the top division meant they never met wearing the 'matching' designs.

English club West Bromwich Albion wore a replica of their 1968 FA Cup Final kit, in their Premier League game against Leicester City on April 11, 2015. It was worn to honour the match-winning goalscorer in the 1968 Cup Final, Jeff Astle, who died in 2002 due to chronic traumatic encephalopathy as a result of heading the heavy leather footballs through his career. The kit used the 1–11 numbering system save for the goalkeeper's shirt, which was left blank as they were in those days.

For the 2019 Copa América, the Brazil national team released a 100th anniversary shirt, in white with blue details. It resembled the shirt worn in the first official match v Exeter City in 1919. The white uniform would be last worn in the 1950 FIFA World Cup 'final' that Brazil lost to Uruguay at Estádio Maracanã. The retro kit debuted in the first match v Bolivia.

In December 2023, German supplier Adidas released its Originals/Lifestyle collection line consisting of now classic 1970s, 1980s and 1990s national team kits. Some kits included were Mexico's 1983–84 away kit, Argentina's 1994–97 away kit featured in their group play match against Greece at the 1994 World Cup; the kit was worn well into the 1997 FIFA World Youth Championship, both of Germany (home and away) and Spain's (home) 1996–97 kits which were featured at Euro 96. All items were released on 1 December 2023 with a pricing of $110.00 USD with several items selling out in less than three minutes.

In June 2024, Nike re-launched Brazil's home kit as worn for the 1998 World Cup and both the 1999 Copa América and FIFA Confederations Cup as leisurewear.

== Baseball ==
=== Major League Baseball ===
In 1990, the Chicago White Sox wore replicas of their 1917 World Series uniforms against the Milwaukee Brewers as part of the White Sox celebration of the final season at Comiskey Park. During the game, the scoreboard and public address system were turned off, and the lineups announced with a hand-held megaphone.

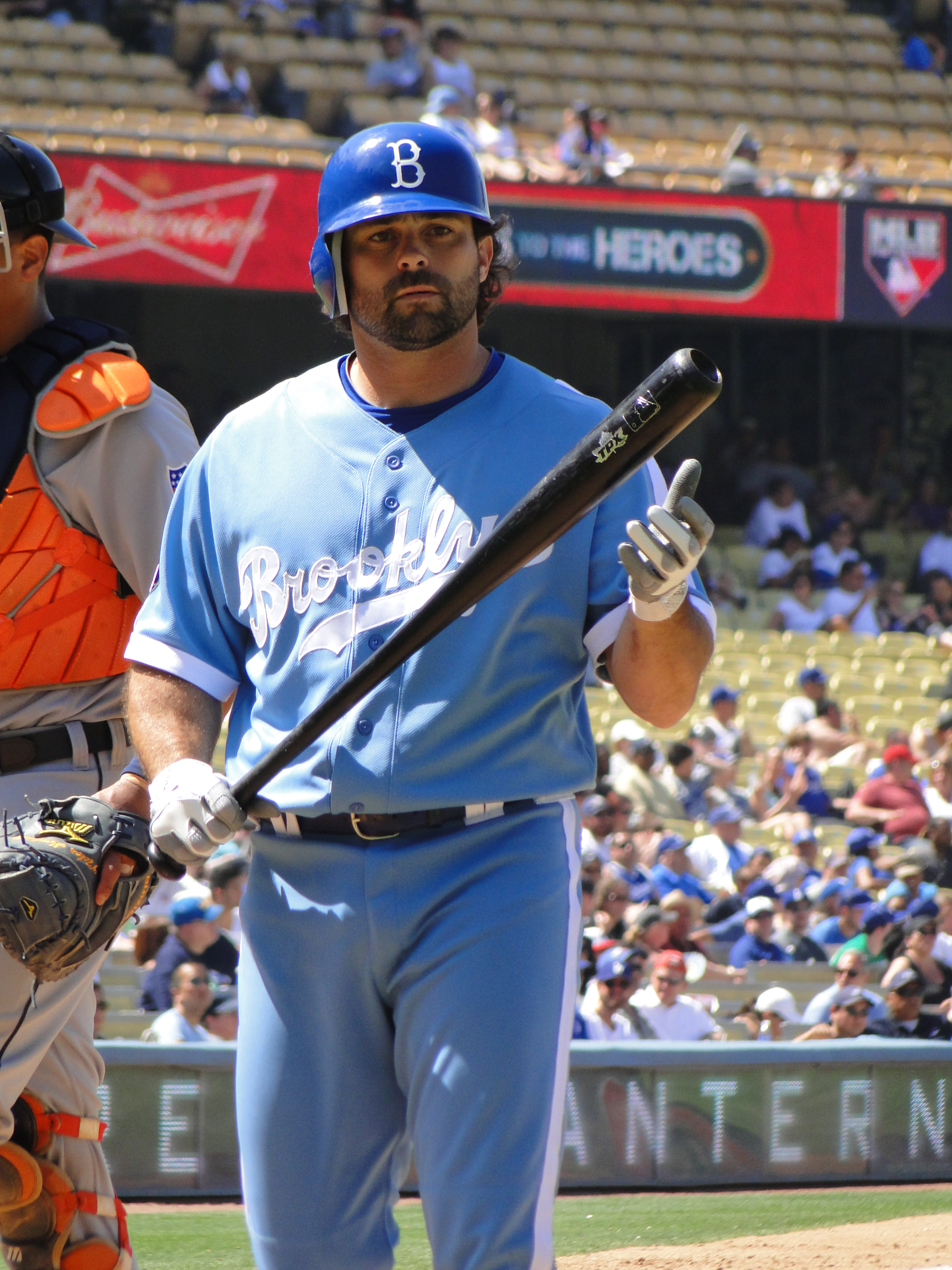
Aaron Miles in a throwback Los Angeles Dodgers uniform in June 2011

In 2003 the St. Louis Cardinals hosted the Baltimore Orioles with teams wearing retro St. Louis Cardinals and St. Louis Browns (the predecessor to today's Orioles, which moved to Baltimore for 1954) uniforms, respectively. The scoreboard that day said "Browns" and the stadium announcer played along with the fantasy as well.

The Tampa Bay Rays have staged a "Turn Back the Clock" promotion with a retro theme and throwback uniforms almost every season of their existence. Because the franchise does not yet have a long history from which to choose uniforms, they have often worn the uniforms of historical local teams such as the Tampa Tarpons of the Florida State League (worn in 1999, 2006, and 2010), the St. Petersburg Pelicans of the Senior Professional Baseball Association (worn in 2008), the St. Petersburg Saints (2007) and Tampa Smokers (2011) of the Florida International League, and the University of Tampa Spartans (2000). The Rays have worn their own uniforms for Turn Back the Clock night only once: in 2009, when they wore Devil Rays "rainbow" uniforms from their 1998 inaugural season.

In 2019, the Cincinnati Reds wore a total of 15 throwback uniforms throughout the season as a part of their 150th anniversary celebration.

=== Other leagues ===
In 1921 a baseball game held at Rickwood Field as part of the Semicentennial of Birmingham, Alabama was played in "old-style" uniforms and according to "the rules of the games as they were in 1872.". Since 1996 Rickwood Field has been the site of the annual "Rickwood Classic", a regular season Birmingham Barons game in which both Southern League teams wear uniforms honoring some period of their respective histories.

== Box lacrosse ==
The Philadelphia Wings indoor lacrosse team ditched their silver, red, and black uniforms for a game to wear their original orange and white jerseys worn in the early 1970s from the original National Lacrosse League. For the 100th anniversary of the rivalry between Johns Hopkins and Maryland in men's lacrosse, both teams wore special retro jerseys. During the 35th anniversary of women's field hockey at Dartmouth College, the Big Green are wearing a special harlequin-design throwback uniform.

== Canadian football ==
The first documented use of a throwback uniform came during the 1998 season, when the Calgary Stampeders wore 1948 red striped jerseys to celebrate the first Grey Cup championship won by the Stampeders franchise. The jerseys were worn on October 4, 1998, against the BC Lions. The BC Lions were the next to wear throwback jerseys in 2003, as they were celebrating their 50th season with orange replica jerseys from the 1954 BC Lions season. Those jerseys were worn four times that season with the first being the home opener that year. In both cases, neither uniform was accurate as the jerseys were paired with pants and helmets from both teams' present day sets. In 2007, the Saskatchewan Roughriders wore green replica jerseys from the late 1960s to 1970s with double white striping over the shoulders. As opposed to the single season usage the Stampeders and Lions employed, the Roughriders wore these jerseys from 2007 to 2013, including their usage in the 97th and 98th Grey Cup.

It wasn't until the 2008 CFL season that the league started to truly embrace throwback uniforms when they announced that the Winnipeg Blue Bombers and Toronto Argonauts would play two games (September 12 in Toronto and October 10 in Winnipeg) to celebrate and recognize the 1950s and in particular, the 1950 Mud Bowl Grey Cup game. Both teams wore coloured jerseys, as was common during the 1950s. Toronto's jerseys were a light blue in colour, with dark blue striping on the sleeves and the team's old "Pull Together" football-as-a-ship logo on the shoulders. The Blue Bombers' jerseys were dark blue in colour, with gold sleeve stripes. The team's 1950s-era logo was on the front of the jersey, just below the V in the neck. A special CFL "Retro Week" logo adorned each jersey as well, that logo being a take-off of the maple leaf one used as the league symbol from 1954 through 1969.

For the 2009 CFL season, all eight teams wore retro uniforms, this time based on uniforms from the 1960s. Week 3 of the 2009 season featured all teams wearing their retro uniforms. When revealed at the time, four teams had white retro jerseys and four had coloured retro jerseys. As the season progressed, Saskatchewan added a green 1960s jersey for the Labour Day Classic and Calgary wore a white 1960s jersey for the Labour Day rematch versus Edmonton. 11 games were scheduled during the season to feature both teams wearing these uniforms while more were added later on.

In 2010, all eight teams again wore retro uniforms and for this season it was based on uniforms worn from the 1970s. Teams wore retro uniforms during weeks 6 and 7, however, contrary to the previous year, only the Saskatchewan Roughriders wore white throwback uniforms, meaning most teams wore their regular white uniforms as the away team. The Roughriders wore their regular 1970s throwback jersey during retro games they hosted. Additionally, during this season, the Roughriders were celebrating their 100th anniversary as a franchise and wore black, red, and silver throwback uniforms similar to the ones worn by the Regina Roughriders from 1912 to 1947. These uniforms were worn on July 17, 2010.

While the league had originally planned to celebrate with retro uniforms each season leading up to the 100th Grey Cup, the CFL did not introduce 1980s-themed uniforms for the 2011 CFL season. Some teams (Calgary, Saskatchewan, Toronto, and Winnipeg) continued wearing the previous year's retro uniforms while the rest wore no throwback uniforms at all. In 2012, all teams remodeled their full uniform set with only Saskatchewan and Winnipeg carrying over their 1970s throwback uniforms.

In 2013, the Toronto Argonauts wore 1980s throwback uniforms on August 23, 2013, to celebrate the 30th anniversary of the 71st Grey Cup championship. Also that year, the Hamilton Tiger-Cats wore red, black, and white replicas of the 1943 Hamilton Flying Wildcats to celebrate the 70th anniversary of their 31st Grey Cup victory.

== Cricket ==
In February 2005 at Eden Park, Auckland, Australia and New Zealand contested the very first Twenty20 cricket international match. Both teams appeared in retro 1980s-style tight-fitting One Day International uniforms without team names, numbers or sponsors' logos. The Australians wore their original "yellow and gold" whilst New Zealand were in "beige" inspired by the Beige Brigade sports fans. The game was played in a light-hearted manner with both teams sporting 1980s-style head bands, moustaches and hairstyles.

== Ice hockey ==
In the 1991–92 NHL season, the Original Six teams, the Boston Bruins, Chicago Blackhawks, Detroit Red Wings, Montreal Canadiens, New York Rangers, and Toronto Maple Leafs all wore throwback jerseys for select games, based on uniforms from before the modern expansion era. In addition, the All-Star Game featured throwbacks based upon the original All-Star uniforms from 1947–1959. In subsequent seasons, teams have worn throwback jerseys on special occasions to celebrate team or even stadium anniversaries, or in annual "heritage uniform" games. The NHL Heritage Classic and NHL Winter Classic also initially began with participating teams wearing throwback uniforms, with later games in both series seeing teams wear hybrid designs inspired by past uniforms, and on occasion from prior teams in the participants' home cities.

For the 2021 and 2022–23 seasons Adidas introduced the "Reverse Retro" program, where each team created a specialty jersey that took elements of old jerseys with a twist. Some teams had colour swapped traditional uniforms, like the Edmonton Oilers who swapped Orange and Blue on their 1980s uniforms, and New Jersey Devils who swapped Green and Red on their '80s uniforms. Other teams merged two eras of their jerseys. The Los Angeles Kings took their original colours of forum blue and gold, and applied it to their 1990s style of jerseys which were only in black and silver. As well, there were teams who combined the looks of their current and former franchises. Such as the Minnesota Wild using North Star colours on their own logo, and the Colorado Avalanche applying their current colours to the style of the Quebec Nordiques jersey.

== See also ==
- Retro style
- Mitchell & Ness
- Special paint scheme – "Retro" paint jobs found their way into NASCAR in the 1990s
- Turn Ahead the Clock
