= D1 Tower =

Residential skyscraper in Dubai

- D1 Tower in 2024

General information
- Type: Residential
- Location: Culture Village, Al Khail Road
- Coordinates: 25°13′37.90″N 55°20′26.52″E
- Construction started: 2007
- Opening: 2015

Height
- Roof: 277 m (909 ft)

Technical details
- Floor count: 78
- Lifts/elevators: 9

Design and construction
- Architects: Innovarchi, and Holford Associates
- Developer: ENSHAA PSC

D1 Tower is one of the main residential skyscrapers in Culture Village in Dubai with a height of 284 metres (932 ft) with 80 floors. The building houses a total of 526 apartment units which include studio apartments, one to six-bedroom standard apartments and penthouses housed on highest floors of the building.

D1 Tower was developed by Enshaa who had purchased it from Emirates Sunland Group. The tower was developed in a joint project by Dubai Properties Group and Emirates Sunland Group. Holford Associates is the architectural firm that developed the framework for this building. D1 construction started in 2007 and it was ready for handover in 2015. D1 Tower at Jaddaf Waterfront has 231st position amongst the tallest buildings in the world. and Regionally, it ranks at 45th place amongst the tallest building in the Middle East. D1 Tower is adjacent to the Palazzo Versace Dubai.

== Design ==
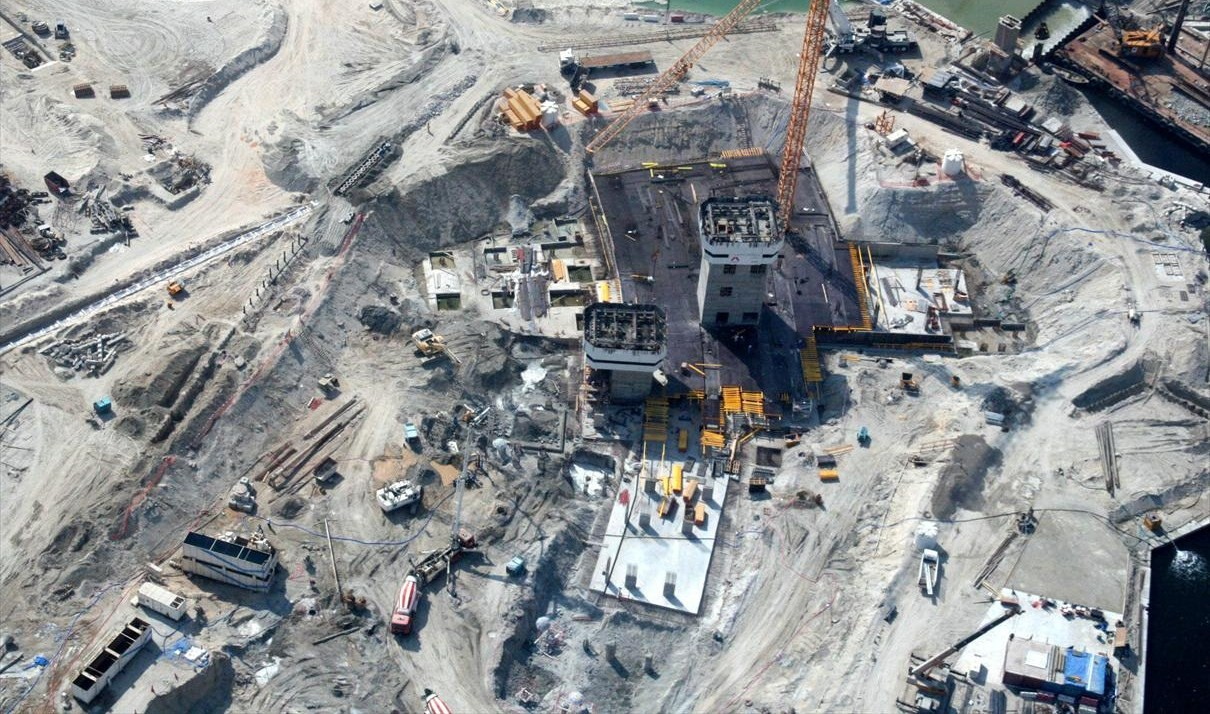
D1 Tower under construction in Culture Village in 2007.

The Tower has a total structural height of 284 m (932 ft), but the design originally included a spire that would bring the total height to 350 m (1,150 ft). Construction of D1 was completed in 2015.

== Similarities with Q1 ==
The Tower is the sister of the world's seventh tallest residential building, Q1 in Gold Coast, Australia. Although they look similar, D1 is structurally shorter, whilst having a taller roof height. This is because Q1 has a roof height of 275 m (902 ft) with a spire increasing the total height to 323 m (1,060 ft).

The appearance of D1 is also quite distinct from Q1. The facades of D1, designed by Innovarchi (directors Ken McBryde and Stephanie Smith) enhance the form of the tower and emphasize the sheer nature of the layered glass curtain wall. The primary facades are conceived as a series of layers to protect against the harsh environment. The timber canopy around the base, is inspired by the craft of Dhow trading boat construction that used to occur on the site. Installation of the canopy is expected from September 2012. The undulating timber structure provides a shaded threshold between the air conditioned internal spaces, bright and hot exterior. It also acts as a moderator between three surrounding scales: the High Speed Freeway / Urban Landmark Scale; the Precinct Scale and the Human Scale.

== See also ==
- List of tallest buildings in Dubai
