= ENSHAA PSC =

- Company type: Real estate
- Headquarters: UAE
- Key people: Raza Jafar
- Website: Official website

ENSHAA PSC is a developer of projects and a hospitality service provider based in the United Arab Emirates. Their CEO is Raza Jafar.

ENSHAA currently operates in the GCC region while also expanding into international markets. The firm's major shareholders include Emirates Investments Group, Majid Al Futtaim Group and Abraaj Capital.

== Portfolio ==
- Palazzo Versace Dubai
- D1 Tower and Emirates Financial Towers.

== See also ==
- Dheeraj and East Coast
