= Palazzo Versace =

Palazzo Versace may refer to:

- Palazzo Versace Dubai, hotel in Culture Village, Dubai
- Palazzo Versace Australia, hotel on the Gold Coast, Queensland, Australia
