= 2009 ICC Champions Trophy final =

2009 ICC Champions Trophy Final
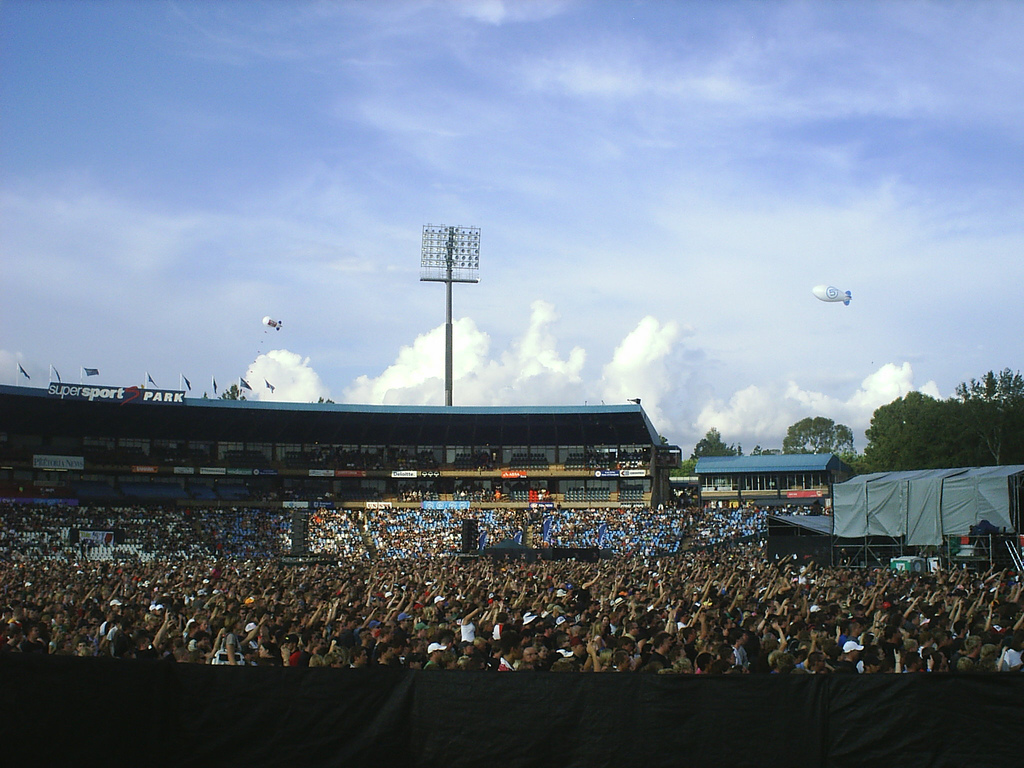
- SuperSport Park in Centurion hosted the Final
- Event: 2009 ICC Champions Trophy
New Zealand	Australia
200/9	206/4
50	45.2
- Australia won by 6 wickets
- Date: 5 October 2009
- Venue: SuperSport Park, Centurion
- Player of the match: Shane Watson (Aus)
- Umpires: Aleem Dar (Pak) and Ian Gould (Eng)
- Attendance: 22,456

The final of the 2009 ICC Champions Trophy was played on 5 October 2009 between New Zealand and Australia at the SuperSport Park, Centurion. Australia qualified into the final by defeating England in the first semi final while New Zealand defeated Pakistan in the second semi final. Australia won the final by 6 wickets, their second consecutive Champions Trophy final victory. Shane Watson earned the man of the match award while Ricky Ponting was named the man of the series for scoring 288 runs throughout the tournament.

== Road to the final ==
=== Australia ===
Australia dominated throughout the tournament. In the group stage, they defeated West Indies and Pakistan while the match with India ended in a no result due to rain. They played the first semi-final against England in Centurion. England batted first and set target of 258 which Australia achieved in 41.2 overs. Shane Watson and Ricky Ponting scored 136 and 111 runs—both not out—sharing 252 runs from 242 balls, Australia highest partnership in One Day Internationals (ODIs). Watson was given man of the match award.

=== New Zealand ===
After losing the first match to South Africa, New Zealand made a comeback by defeating Sri Lanka and England in the group stage. They played the second semi-final against Pakistan in Johannesburg. Pakistan batted first and set target of 234 which New Zealand achieved in 47.5 overs with Grant Elliott being the highest run-scorer. Daniel Vettori earned the man of the match award for his all-round performance; he took 3 wickets for 43 runs in 10 overs and scored 41 runs.

== Match details ==
=== Match officials ===
- On-field umpires: Aleem Dar (Pak) and Ian Gould (Eng)
- TV umpire: Asad Rauf (Pak)
- Reserve umpire: Billy Bowden (NZ)
- Match referee: Roshan Mahanama (SL)

=== Summary ===
Australia remained unchanged from the side that played the semi-final, while New Zealand brought Jeetan Patel in place of injured captain Daniel Vettori.

New Zealand's new captain Brendon McCullum won the toss and elected to bat first. They had a poor start as McCullum was cheaply dismissed by Siddle. Redmond's 26 and Guptill's 40 runs contribution stabilized the innings but later they were dismissed by Hauritz, leaving them on 77 off 3. Soon, Taylor and Elliott were also dismissed early, but Broom's 37, Franklin's 33 and J. Patel's 16* led them to an average total of 200 runs for 9 wickets in 50 overs. Hauritz was the best bowler for Australia as he picked up 3 wickets, while Brett Lee got 2 wickets. Johnson and Siddle got 1 wicket each.

Australia, in reply had a poor start to the chase as they lost Paine and Ponting early leaving them on 6 off 2, thanks to good bowling display by Shane Bond and Kyle Mills. As Shane Watson and Cameron White were playing in a "Test match-mode" but later the momentum shifted as they managed a partnership of 128 runs before the dismissal of White on 62. Soon, Hussey was cheaply dismissed by Mills leaving them on 156 off 4. Later, Hopes joined Watson and they managed to stabilize the innings. Watson scored 105* from 129 balls, thanks to his back-to-back sixes, he completed his century and achieved the target in 45.4 overs, as Australia won the match by 6 wickets. This was the second consecutive occasion for Watson earning man of the match award in the final of ICC Champions Trophy. It was Australia's fifth consecutive win after becoming finalists in multi-team tournaments since 1999.

During the post-match presentation, the iconic white jackets were given for the first time to Australia, who were the winners of the tournament and this tradition has been continued in later editions.

5 October
14:30
Scorecard

New Zealand; 200/9 (50 overs)	v	Australia; 206/4 (45.2 overs)
Martin Guptill 40 (64); Nathan Hauritz 3/37 (10 overs)		Shane Watson 105* (129); Kyle Mills 3/27 (10 overs)

Australia won by 6 wickets
SuperSport Park, Centurion
Umpires: Aleem Dar (Pak) and Ian Gould (Eng)
Player of the match: Shane Watson (Aus)

- New Zealand won the toss and elected to bat.

== Scorecard ==
New Zealand batting
Player	Status	Runs	Balls	4s	6s	Strike rate
Brendon McCullum *†	c †Paine b Siddle	0	14	0	0	0.00
Aaron Redmond	st †Paine b Hauritz	26	45	3	0	57.77
Martin Guptill	c & b Hauritz	40	64	3	0	62.50
Ross Taylor	c Hussey b Johnson	6	13	0	0	46.15
Grant Elliott	lbw b Lee	9	9	0	0	100.00
Neil Broom	run out (Hussey/Watson)	37	62	5	0	59.67
James Franklin	b Lee	33	43	4	0	76.74
Kyle Mills	run out (Ponting)	12	15	1	0	80.00
Ian Butler	lbw b Hauritz	6	7	1	0	85.71
Jeetan Patel	not out	16	19	1	0	84.21
Shane Bond	not out	3	9	0	0	33.33
Extras	(b 1, lb 2, w 9)	12				
Total	(9 wickets; 50 overs)	200		18	0	

Fall of wickets: 1/5 (McCullum, 3.2 ov), 2/66 (Redmond, 18.3 ov), 3/77 (Guptill, 22.2 ov), 4/81 (Taylor, 23.1 ov), 5/94 (Elliott, 26.4 ov), 6/159 (Broom, 40.5 ov), 7/166 (Franklin, 41.6 ov), 8/174 (Butler, 43.4 ov), 9/187 (Mills, 46.4 ov)

Australia bowling
Bowler	Overs	Maidens	Runs	Wickets	Econ	Wides	NBs
Brett Lee	10	1	45	2	4.50	5	0
Peter Siddle	10	1	30	1	3.00	0	0
Mitchell Johnson	10	1	35	1	3.50	1	0
Shane Watson	10	0	50	0	5.00	2	0
Nathan Hauritz	10	0	37	3	3.70	1	0

Australia batting
Player	Status	Runs	Balls	4s	6s	Strike rate
Shane Watson	not out	105	129	10	4	81.39
Tim Paine †	c Taylor b Bond	1	6	0	0	16.66
Ricky Ponting *	lbw b Mills	1	4	0	0	25.00
Cameron White	b Mills	62	102	7	1	60.78
Michael Hussey	c Patel b Mills	11	9	1	0	122.22
James Hopes	not out	22	22	4	0	100.00
Callum Ferguson						
Mitchell Johnson						
Brett Lee						
Nathan Hauritz						
Peter Siddle						
Extras	(lb 3, w 1)	4				
Total	(4 wickets; 45.2 overs)	206		22	5	

Fall of wickets: 1/2 (Paine, 1.2 ov), 2/6 (Ponting, 2.2 ov), 3/134 (White, 34.5 ov), 4/156 (Hussey, 38.3 ov)

New Zealand bowling
Bowler	Overs	Maidens	Runs	Wickets	Econ	Wides	NBs
Kyle Mills	10	2	27	3	2.70	0	0
Shane Bond	10	2	34	1	3.40	1	0
Ian Butler	9	0	50	0	5.55	0	0
James Franklin	9	0	42	0	4.66	0	0
Jeetan Patel	6.2	0	44	0	6.94	0	0
Grant Elliott	1	0	6	0	6.00	0	0

Key

- * – Captain
- † – Wicket-keeper
- c Fielder – Indicates that the batsman was dismissed by a catch by the named fielder
- b Bowler – Indicates which bowler gains credit for the dismissal
