= Kyle Mills =

New Zealand cricketer (born 1979)

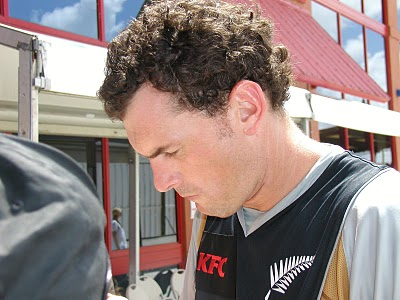

Personal information
- Full name: Kyle David Mills
- Born: 15 March 1979 (age 47); Auckland, New Zealand
- Nickname: Millsy
- Height: 193 cm (6 ft 4 in)
- Batting: Right-handed
- Bowling: Right-arm fast-medium
- Role: Bowler

International information
- National side: New Zealand (2001–2015)
- Test debut (cap 227): 10 June 2004 v England
- Last Test: 18 March 2009 v India
- ODI debut (cap 123): 15 April 2001 v Pakistan
- Last ODI: 31 January 2015 v Pakistan
- ODI shirt no.: 37 (previously 20)
- T20I debut (cap 7): 17 February 2005 v Australia
- Last T20I: 5 December 2014 v Pakistan
- T20I shirt no.: 37

Domestic team information
- Years: Team
- 1998/99–2014/15: Auckland
- 2001: Lincolnshire
- 2012: Uthura Rudras
- 2013: Middlesex

Career statistics
| Competition | Test | ODI | T20I | FC |
|---|---|---|---|---|
| Matches | 19 | 170 | 42 | 76 |
| Runs scored | 289 | 1,047 | 137 | 2,166 |
| Batting average | 11.56 | 15.62 | 11.41 | 26.09 |
| 100s/50s | 0/1 | 0/2 | 0/0 | 1/14 |
| Top score | 57 | 54 | 33* | 117* |
| Balls bowled | 2,902 | 8,230 | 897 | 12,350 |
| Wickets | 44 | 240 | 43 | 204 |
| Bowling average | 33.02 | 27.02 | 28.55 | 29.81 |
| 5 wickets in innings | 0 | 1 | 0 | 5 |
| 10 wickets in match | 0 | 0 | 0 | 2 |
| Best bowling | 4/16 | 5/25 | 3/26 | 5/33 |
| Catches/stumpings | 4/– | 42/– | 8/– | 27/– |
Medal record
Men's Cricket
Representing New Zealand
ICC Cricket World Cup
| Runner-up | 2015 Australia and New Zealand |
- Source: ESPNcricinfo, 31 January 2015

Kyle David Mills (born 15 March 1979) is a New Zealand cricket coach and former international cricketer who is the former bowling coach of the Kolkata Knight Riders. He was also a former captain of the New Zealand cricket team in limited-overs matches. Mills played top-class cricket between 1998 and 2015 as a bowler. He featured in three World Cup tournaments for New Zealand in 2003, 2011 and 2015. He was a member of New Zealand's first ever T20I team. He also topped the ICC ODI bowling rankings in 2009 and also occupied in the top ten bowling rankings among bowlers in ODI cricket for a considerable period of time. He was also a part of the New Zealand squad to finish as runners-up at the 2015 Cricket World Cup.

He is the second leading wicket-taker for New Zealand in ODI cricket with 240 wickets just behind Daniel Vettori's tally of 297 wickets and he has also taken the most number of wickets by a New Zealand seamer in ODIs. He is also the all-time leading wicket-taker in ICC Champions Trophy with 28 scalps in 15 matches. He was sidelined for consistent injury concerns in his playing days. He underwent surgeries and rehabilitation to recover from knee and shoulder injuries during his early and latter stages of his international career. His continuous injury concerns took a toll on his test career which ended prematurely in 2009 after appearing in just 19 test matches. However, he served a white ball specialist and emerged as a lead strike bowler for New Zealand.

== Early life and education ==
Born in Auckland in 1979, Mills is of Ngāi Tahu descent.

== Domestic career ==
Mills played domestically for Auckland. He made his first-class debut for Auckland in the 1998/99 season. He was picked by Kings XI Punjab for the inaugural edition of the Indian Premier League in 2008, but did not play in any of the matches. He was later bought by Mumbai Indians for the 2009 Indian Premier League but he was used only as a net bowler by Mumbai Indians for the 2009 IPL season. He ruled himself out of 2010 Indian Premier League as he was recovering from knee injury.

He was also picked for the inaugural edition of the Sri Lanka Premier League by Uthura Rudras in 2012. He signed a contract with the English county cricket for Middlesex to play in 2013 Friends Life t20.

Mills announced his retirement from all forms of cricket on 1 April 2015. He announced his retirement a day after Daniel Vettori had announced his retirement from all forms of cricket.

== International career ==
He made his ODI debut against Pakistan on 15 April 2001 against Pakistan during the 2000–01 ARY Gold Cup and took his first ODI wicket on his debut by dismissing Imran Nazir. He delivered a match winning spell in his second ODI match which also eventually came during the ARY Gold Cup Tri-nation series where he picked up 3/30 against Sri Lanka and shared the man of the Match award along with Mathew Sinclair.

He made his maiden ICC Champions Trophy appearance during the 2002 ICC Champions Trophy campaign which was held in Sri Lanka. He ended the 2002 Champions Trophy tournament with three wickets in two matches. He made his debut World Cup appearance at the 2003 Cricket World Cup. However, he featured in just one group stage match at the 2003 World Cup and went wicketless.

He made his test debut against England on 10 June 2004, three years after his ODI debut. His test debut came at Trent Bridge only after the injury concerns to Shane Bond and Daryl Tuffey. However, he picked up a side strain on his test debut where he only managed to bowl six overs in England's first innings and couldn't bowl in the second innings. He was subsequently ruled out of the remainder of the test series.

He was part of the world's first T20I match which happened on 17 February 2005 between New Zealand and Australia. Although New Zealand lost the inaugural T20I by 44 runs, Mills made an impact picking up 3/44 on his T20I debut after opening the bowling with Tuffey. He made his mark in international cricket as a lead pacer during the 2006 ICC Champions Trophy which marked a turning point in his career where he finished the tournament as the leading wicket-taker for Kiwis with 10 wickets in just four matches.

Having been injured in Australia in February 2007, Mills was forced to withdraw from the 2007 Cricket World Cup. He was also not selected for 2007 ICC World Twenty20, which was the inaugural edition of the ICC Men's T20 World Cup. He was initially out for at least 12 months but after an operation on a patella tendon and a winter of rehabilitation, he worked his way back to fitness to take part in New Zealand's tour of South Africa in November–December 2007. Called into the test side, Mills was forced to withdraw from the second and final Test due to a stomach bug. Coming fresh into the three match one day series, Mills was the pick of the New Zealand bowlers in all three matches, taking career best figures of 5/25 in the series opener. Despite New Zealand losing the series 2–1, Mills was named man of the series. Due in part of the absence of Shane Bond, who signed to play in the Indian Cricket League, and Mills' continued good form, he maintained his place in the ODI side. Mills became a frontline bowler for New Zealand in limited-overs matches from 2008 in and was groomed to fill the void left by Bond.

During a test match against England in March 2008, he ran through the English top order with his spell of 4/16 which was also his career best test figures. His bowling helped the home side New Zealand to a comfortable crushing win by 188 runs. He dismissed Alastair Cook, Michael Vaughan, Andrew Strauss and Kevin Pietersen within his first seven overs of his spell on the final day of the test match whereas England were given a brisk target of 300. He was selected for New Zealand's 2009 ICC World Twenty20 campaign which was also his maiden appearance in a T20 World Cup. He was also a member of the New Zealand side which emerged as runners-up in the 2009 ICC Champions Trophy Final, after losing to Australia in South Africa.

He achieved his highest career ODI ranking in 2009 as he was ranked as no 1 bowler in the ICC rankings for bowlers in ODIs after taking nine wickets against Australia in the 2008-09 Chappell-Hadlee Trophy and for his performances during the 2009 ICC Champions Trophy where he ended up as the leading wicket-taker for New Zealand with nine scalps in five matches. He was selected to the New Zealand squad for the 2011 Cricket World Cup as an injury replacement for Hamish Bennett. However, after featuring in just three group stage matches he was ruled out of the remainder of the 2011 World Cup tournament due to an injury. He sustained a quadriceps strain during a group stage match against Canada and was subsequently replaced by Andy McKay for the remaining World Cup matches.

He was the most successful bowler for New Zealand during the 2013 ICC Champions Trophy whereas he ended the tournament with six scalps at an average of 10.5 in 3 matches. After picking 6 wickets in 2013 CT, he became the leading wicket-taker in the history of Champions Trophy with a total of 28 wickets.

In November 2013, he served as a stand-in captain on his captaincy debut in the third and the final ODI against Bangladesh which New Zealand lost. He made his T20I captaincy debut in the one-off T20I against Bangladesh which New Zealand won by 15 runs. He was appointed as the captain of the national team for the limited overs tour of Sri Lanka in 2013 replacing Kane Williamson.

In August 2014, he took part in the ALS Ice Bucket Challenge after being invited by his teammate Brendon McCullum. He was picked for the New Zealand side for the 2015 World Cup, but he did not feature in any of the matches.

== Coaching career ==
He was appointed as bowling coach for Kolkata Knight Riders alongside David Hussey who was appointed as chief mentor ahead of the 2020 Indian Premier League.

== Disciplinary issues ==
In January 2004, he was officially reprimanded by match referee Chris Broad for his excessive appeal during an ODI match between Pakistan and New Zealand at Napier.

He was fined 20% of his match fees for showing dissent, excessive appeal and offensive language during an ODI match between Pakistan and New Zealand at Abu Dhabi.

In 2010, he was banned from bowling in a warmup match for at least half an hour after breaching Law 17.1 for pitching a practice delivery on the popping crease.

He was fined by the International Cricket Council for breaching the ICC Code of Conduct during the quarter final match between South Africa and New Zealand in the 2011 World Cup. He was charged for exchanging words with South African batsman Faf du Plessis following the run out of AB de Villiers.
