= Culture Village =

Development project in Dubai, United Arab Emirates

Coordinates: 25°13′36″N 55°20′19″E

The Culture Village (a.k.a. Jaddaf Waterfront) is a multi-purpose development project located in Al Jaddaf, Dubai, United Arab Emirates, along the shoreline of the Dubai Creek on a 40,000,000-square-foot (3,700,000 m^{2}) plot of land. When completed the village will include a harbour, cultural and exhibition centres, and dockside development. The centrepiece of this project is Palazzo Versace Dubai, the world's second after Palazzo Versace of Queensland, Australia.The culture village mainly designed to enhance the UAE's position regionally and internationally in the field of culture and the arts and the master plan has been divided into residential, commercial and retail zones with hospitality and entertainment sub-districts. It is mostly expected to appeal to both local and international investors.

== Projects of Dubai Cultural Village ==
=== Palazzo Versace ===
The hotel covers an area of 37,224 sqm, including restaurants, spa, 169 condominium residences and penthouses, 146 hotel rooms and 58 suites.

=== D1 ===
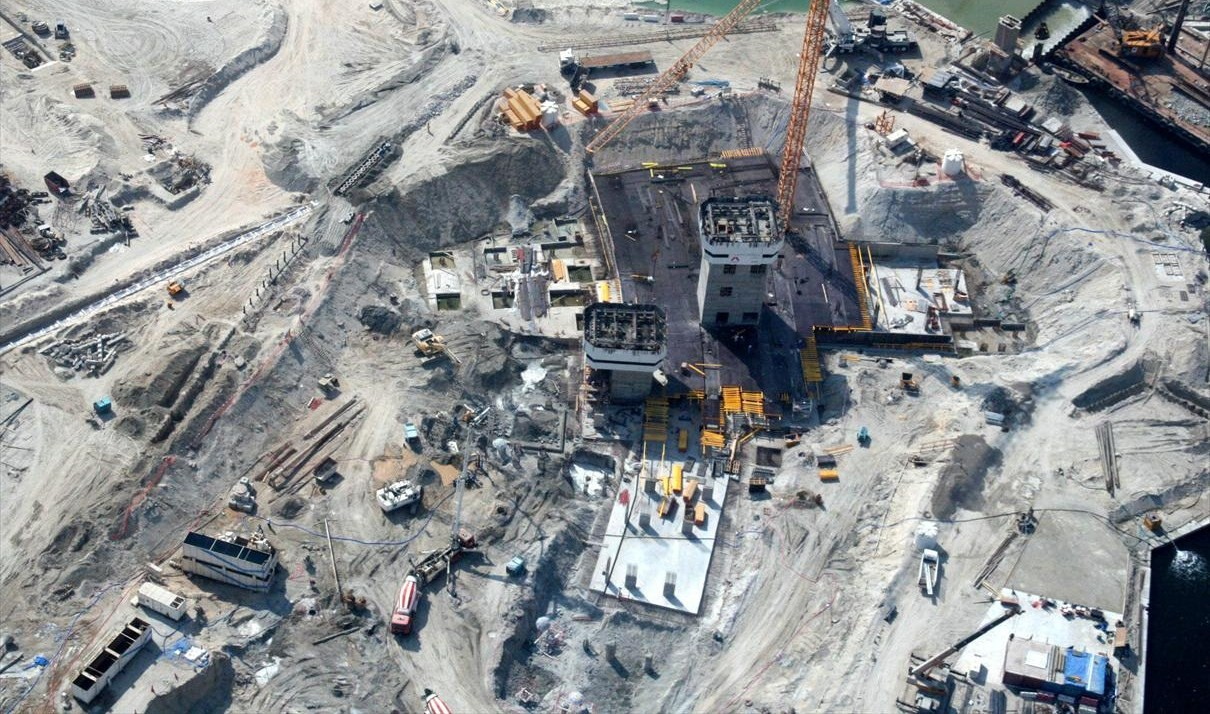
D1 tower under construction in Culture Village in 2007

D1 (meaning Dubai Number One) is an 80-floor residential skyscraper. The 80-story tower includes a sky rise lounge, indoor pool, and gymnasium. It is 284m tall, with a spire that is 350m tall.

Other projects include:

- Iris Amber
- Nur
- Yuvi Residence

== Districts ==
The development includes the following districts:

- Residential district
- Commercial district
- Retail district
- Shopping district

== See also ==
- Culture of Dubai
- Global Village (Dubai)
- Dheeraj and East Coast LLC
