= Emirates Financial Towers =

Coordinates: 25.217680°N 55.283546°E

- Interactive map of the Emirates Financial Towers area

General information
- Status: Completed
- Type: Commercial - Office and retail
- Location: Dubai, United Arab Emirates

Design and construction
- Developer: ENSHAA PSC, MAG Group

Emirates Financial Towers is a 27 story twin-tower commercial development located in the Dubai International Financial Centre, Dubai’s central financial district.

The development, which was completed and handed over in June 2011, consists of office and retail units and the towers are connected on the 16th floor by a glass skybridge, designed as a food and beverage space.

Emirates Financial Towers holds the Guinness World Record for the largest automated parking system in the world.

The development was a joint venture between ENSHAA PSC and MAG Group.
