= Rob Walter =

South African cricket coach (born 1975)

Personal information
- Full name: Rob Alun Walter
- Born: 16 September 1975 (age 51)
Medal record
Men's Cricket
Representing South Africa as Coach
ICC T20 World Cup
Runner-up	2024 West Indies & USA
Representing New Zealand as Coach
ICC T20 World Cup
Runner-up	2026 India & Sri Lanka

Rob Alun Walter (born 16 September 1975 in Johannesburg, South Africa) is a South African cricket coach, currently in charge of the New Zealand national team.

He was the head coach of South Africa in the One Day International and Twenty20 International formats from January 2023 until 30 April 2025 helping them reach the 2024 T20 World Cup final.

In June 2025, he became head coach of the New Zealand team across all formats, succeeding Gary Stead.

== Early life ==
Walter was born in Johannesburg on 16 September 1975.

== Career ==
Walter served as the Proteas' strength, conditioning, and fielding coach from 2009 to 2013.

In 2013, Walter was appointed as the head coach of Titans. Later, he also worked as an assistant coach with the Pune Warriors and Delhi Daredevils in the Indian Premier League. In 2016, Walter moved to New Zealand to coach the Otago Volts for five years, leading them to two finals.

In April 2021, Walter joined the Central Stags. and also gained experience in international cricket with New Zealand A in 2022.

He departed from New Zealand in January 2023 to assume the position of head coach with the South Africa national cricket team. In April 2025, Walter resigned from his South African position effective 30 April 2025.

In June 2025, New Zealand Cricket announced Walter's appointment as head coach of New Zealand, with a contract running to November 2028.
