= New Zealand national cricket team =

Men's international cricket team

New Zealand
- Nickname: Black Caps
- Association: New Zealand Cricket

Personnel
- Test captain: Tom Latham
- One Day captain: Mitchell Santner
- T20I captain: Mitchell Santner
- Coach: Rob Walter

History
- Test status acquired: 1930

International Cricket Council
- ICC status: Full Member (1926)
- ICC region: East Asia-Pacific
ICC Rankings	Current	Best-ever
Test	3rd	1st (6 January 2021)
ODI	2nd	1st (3 May 2021)
T20I	4th	1st (4 May 2016)

Tests
- First Test: v. England at Lancaster Park, Christchurch; 10–13 January 1930
- Last Test: v. England at Trent Bridge, Nottingham; 25–29 June 2026
Tests	Played	Won/Lost
Total	487	126/190 (171 draws)
This year	4	3/1 (0 draws)
- World Test Championship appearances: 4 (first in 2019–21)
- Best result: Champions (2019–21)

One Day Internationals
- First ODI: v. Pakistan at Lancaster Park, Christchurch; 11 February 1973
- Last ODI: v. India at Bay Oval, Mount Maunganui; 15 November 2026
ODIs	Played	Won/Lost
Total	863	403/408 (7 ties, 45 no results)
This year	16	7/8 (0 ties, 1 no result)
- World Cup appearances: 13 (first in 1975)
- Best result: Runners-up (2015, 2019)

T20 Internationals
- First T20I: v. Australia at Eden Park, Auckland; 17 February 2005
- Last T20I: v. India at Seddon Park, Hamilton; 1 November 2026
T20Is	Played	Won/Lost
Total	272	137/113 (10 ties, 12 no results)
This year	26	11/14 (0 ties, 1 no result)
- T20 World Cup appearances: 10 (first in 2007)
- Best result: Runners-up (2021, 2026)
Test kit
ODI kit
T20I kit
- As of 15 November 2026

The New Zealand men's national cricket team represents New Zealand in men's international cricket. Nicknamed the Black Caps (Māori: Pōtae Pango), they played their first Test in 1930 against England in Christchurch, becoming the fifth country to play Test cricket. From 1930, New Zealand had to wait until 1956, more than 26 years, for its first Test victory, against the West Indies at Eden Park in Auckland. They played their first ODI in the 1972–73 season against Pakistan in Christchurch. New Zealand are the inaugural champions of ICC World Test Championship which they won in 2021 and they have also won ICC Champions Trophy in 2000. They were also runners-up in the ICC Cricket World Cup in 2015 and 2019, as well as the ICC T20 World Cup in 2021 and 2026.

Tom Latham is the current captain of the team in Test cricket and Mitchell Santner is the current captain of the team in ODI and T20I cricket. The national team is organised by New Zealand Cricket.

The New Zealand cricket team became known as the Black Caps in January 1998, after its sponsor at the time, Clear Communications, held a competition to choose a name for the team. This is one of many national team nicknames related to the All Blacks.

As of 22 July 2026, the team is ranked 3rd in Tests, 2nd in ODIs and 4th in T20Is by the ICC.

As of 2026, the team has participated in all the 35 ICC Men's events taking place from 1975 onwards and have made eight final appearances out of which they won two titles. In October 2000, they won the ICC Knockout Trophy (now called ICC Champions Trophy). In June 2021, they won the inaugural ICC World Test Championship 2019–21.

== History ==
=== Beginnings of cricket in New Zealand ===
The reverend Henry Williams provided history with the first report of a game of cricket in New Zealand, when he wrote in his diary in December 1832 about boys in and around Paihia on Horotutu Beach playing cricket. In 1835, Charles Darwin and HMS Beagle called into the Bay of Islands on its epic circumnavigation of the Earth and Darwin witnessed a game of cricket played by freed Māori slaves and the son of a missionary at Waimate North. Darwin in The Voyage of the Beagle wrote:

several young men redeemed by the missionaries from slavery were employed on the farm. In the evening I saw a party of them at cricket.

The first recorded game of cricket in New Zealand took place in Wellington in December 1842. The Wellington Spectator reports a game on 28 December 1842 played by a "Red" team and a "Blue" team from the Wellington Club. The first fully recorded match was reported by the Examiner in Nelson between the Surveyors and Nelson in March 1844.

The first team to tour New Zealand was Parr's all England XI in 1863–64. Between 1864 and 1914, 22 foreign teams toured New Zealand. England sent 6 teams, Australia 15 and one from Fiji.

=== First national team ===
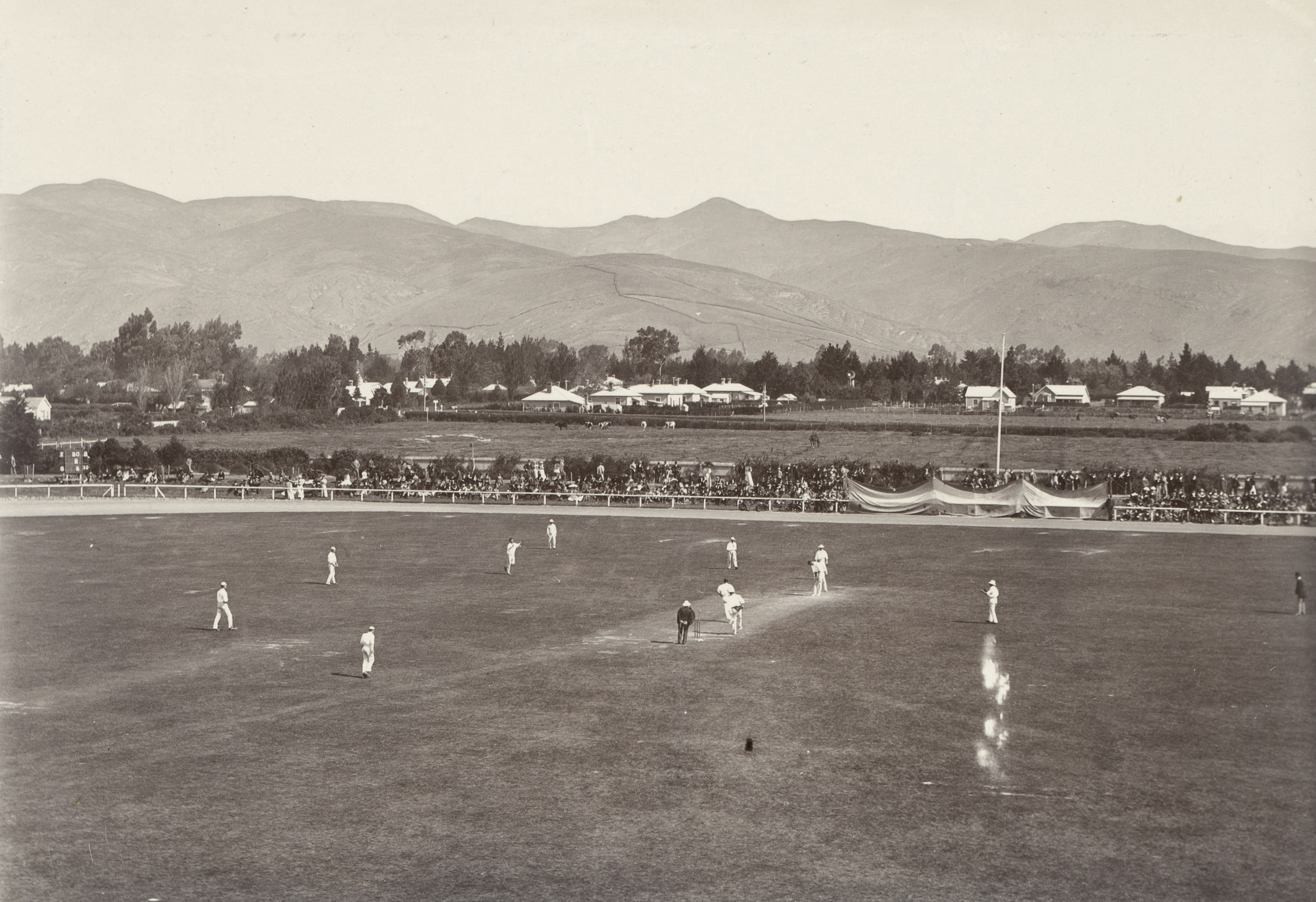
Australia v Canterbury, Lancaster Park, Christchurch, New Zealand, 1 February 1894

On 15–17 February 1894 the first team representing New Zealand played New South Wales at Lancaster Park in Christchurch. New South Wales won by 160 runs. New South Wales returned again in 1895–96 and New Zealand won the solitary game by 142 runs, its first victory. The New Zealand Cricket Council was formed towards the end of 1894.

New Zealand played its first two internationals (not Tests) in 1904–05 against a star-studded Australia team containing such players as Victor Trumper, Warwick Armstrong and Clem Hill. Rain saved New Zealand from a thrashing in the first match, but not the second, which New Zealand lost by an innings and 358 runs – currently the second-largest defeat in New Zealand first-class history.

=== Inter-war period ===
In 1927 they toured England for the first time. They played 26 first-class matches, mostly against county teams. They won seven matches, including those against Worcestershire, Glamorgan, Somerset and Derbyshire. On the strength of the performances of this tour New Zealand was granted Test status.

In 1929/30 the English team toured the country and played 4 Tests all of 3 days in duration. New Zealand lost its first Test match but drew the next 3. In the second Test Stewie Dempster and Jackie Mills put on 276 for the first wicket. This is still the highest partnership for New Zealand against England. New Zealand first played South Africa in 1931–32 in a three match series but were unable to secure Test matches against any teams other than England before World War II ended all Test cricket for 7 years. A Test tour by Australia, planned for February and March 1940, was cancelled after the outbreak of the war.

=== After World War II ===
New Zealand's first Test after the war was against Australia in 1945/46. This game was not considered a "Test" at the time but it was granted Test status retrospectively by the International Cricket Council in March 1948. The New Zealand players who appeared in this match probably did not appreciate this move by the ICC as New Zealand were dismissed for 42 and 54. The New Zealand Cricket Council's unwillingness to pay Australian players a decent allowance to tour New Zealand ensured that this was the only Test Australia played against New Zealand between 1929 and 1972.

In 1949 New Zealand sent one of its best-ever teams to England. It contained Bert Sutcliffe, Martin Donnelly, John R. Reid and Jack Cowie. However, 3-day Test matches ensured that all 4 Tests were drawn. Many have regarded the 1949 tour of England among New Zealand's best ever touring performances. All four tests were high-scoring despite being draws and Martin Donnelly's 206 at Lord's hailed as one of the finest innings ever seen there. Despite being winless, New Zealand did not lose a test either. Prior to this, only the legendary 1948 Australian team, led by the great Don Bradman, had achieved this.

New Zealand played its first matches against the West Indies in 1951–52, and Pakistan and India in 1955/56.

In 1954/55 New Zealand recorded the lowest ever innings total, 26 against England. The following season New Zealand achieved its first Test victory. The first 3 Tests of a 4 Test series were won easily by the West Indies but New Zealand won the fourth to notch up its first Test victory. It had taken them 45 matches and 26 years to attain.

9, 10, 12, 13 March 1956
Scorecard

New Zealand	v	West Indies
255 all out (166.5 overs); John R. Reid 84; Tom Dewdney 5/21 (19.5 overs)		145 all out (78.3 overs); Hammond Furlonge 64; Harry Cave 4/22 (27.3 overs)
157 all out (80 overs); Sammy Guillen 41; Denis Atkinson 7/53 (40 overs)		77 all out (45.1 overs); Everton Weekes 31; Harry Cave 4/21 (13.1 overs)

New Zealand won by 190 runs
Eden Park, Auckland
Umpires: Clyde Harris (NZL) and Terry Pearce (NZL)

- New Zealand won the toss and chose to bat

In the next 20 years, New Zealand won only seven more Tests. For most of this period New Zealand lacked a class bowler to lead their attack although they had two excellent batsmen in Bert Sutcliffe and Glenn Turner and a great all-rounder in John R. Reid.

Reid captained New Zealand on a tour to South Africa in 1961–62 where the five-test series was drawn 2–2. The victories in the third and fifth tests were the first overseas victories New Zealand achieved. Reid scored 1,915 runs in the tour, setting a record for the most runs scored by a touring batsman of South Africa as a result.

New Zealand won their first test series in their three match 1969/70 tour of Pakistan 1–0. This was the first ever series win by New Zealand after almost 40 years and 30 consecutive winless series.

=== 1970 to 2000 ===
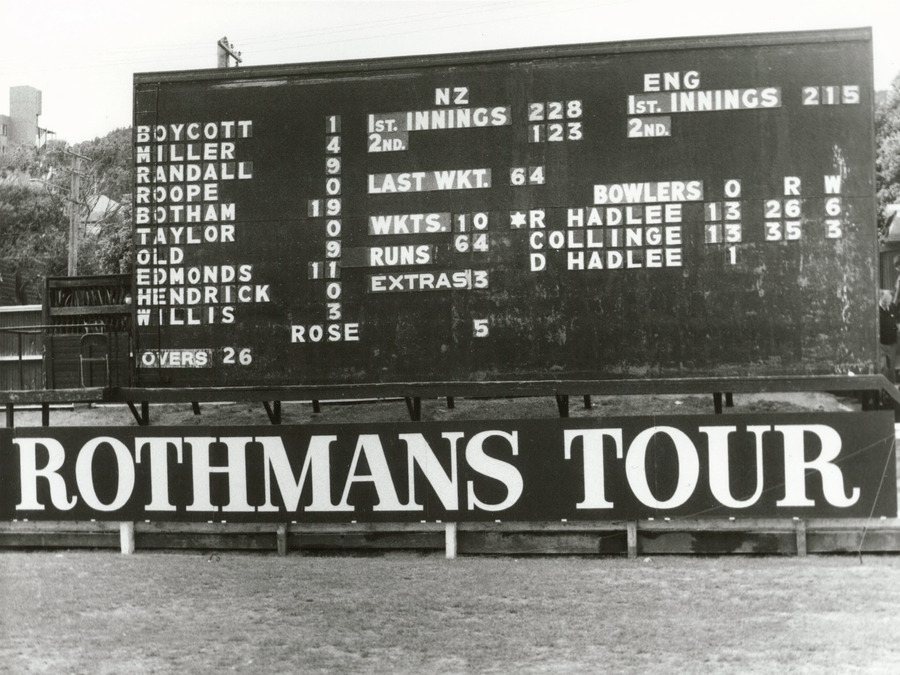
Scoreboard – Basin Reserve, February 1978. NZ's first win over England

In 1973 Richard Hadlee debuted and the rate at which New Zealand won Tests picked up dramatically. Hadlee was one of the best pace bowlers of his generation, playing 86 Tests for New Zealand before he retired in 1990. Of the 86 Tests that Hadlee played in New Zealand won 22 and lost 28. In 1977/78 New Zealand won its first Test against England, at the 48th attempt. Hadlee took 10 wickets in the match.

During the 1980s New Zealand also had the services of batsman Martin Crowe and a number of other players such as John Wright, Bruce Edgar, John F. Reid, Andrew Jones, Geoff Howarth, Jeremy Coney, Ian Smith, John Bracewell, Lance Cairns, Stephen Boock, and Ewen Chatfield, who were capable of playing the occasional match-winning performance and making a valuable contribution to a Test match.

The best example of New Zealand's two star players (R. Hadlee and M. Crowe) putting in match-winning performances and other players making good contributions is New Zealand versus Australia, 1985 at Brisbane. In Australia's first innings Hadlee took 9–52. In New Zealand's only innings, M Crowe scored 188 and John F. Reid 108. Edgar, Wright, Coney, Jeff Crowe, V. Brown, and Hadlee scored between 17 and 54*. In Australia's second innings, Hadlee took 6–71 and Chatfield 3–75. New Zealand won by an innings and 41 runs.

8–12 November 1985
Scorecard

Australia	v	New Zealand
179 (76.4 overs); Kepler Wessels 70 (186); Richard Hadlee 9/52 (23.4 overs)		553/7d (161 overs); Martin Crowe 188 (328); Greg Matthews 3/110 (31 overs)
333 (116.5 overs Allan Border 152* (301); Richard Hadlee 6/71 (28.5 overs)

New Zealand won by an innings and 41 runs
The Gabba, Brisbane
Umpires: Tony Crafter (Aus) and Dick French (Aus)
Player of the match: Richard Hadlee (NZ)

- New Zealand won the toss and elected to field.

One-day cricket provided New Zealand with opportunities to play more frequently against other international teams than Test cricket allowed. In this format, a team can win without individual batsmen scoring centuries or bowlers taking all ten wickets. Victories can be achieved through a combination of partial batting contributions, economical bowling, and effective fielding. New Zealand players met these performance requirements, establishing a competitive record in one-day international cricket.

Perhaps New Zealand's most infamous one-day match was the "under arm" match against Australia at the MCG in 1981. Requiring six runs to tie the match off the final ball, Australian captain Greg Chappell instructed his brother Trevor to bowl the ball underarm along the wicket to prevent New Zealand batsman Brian McKechnie from hitting a six. The Australian umpires ruled the move as legal even though to this day many believe it was one of the most unsporting decisions made in cricket.

When New Zealand next played in the tri-series in Australia in 1983, Lance Cairns became a cult hero for his one-day batting. In one match against Australia, he hit six sixes at the MCG, one of the world's largest grounds. Few fans remember that New Zealand lost this game by 149 runs. However, Lance's greatest contribution to New Zealand cricket was his son Chris Cairns.

Chris Cairns made his debut one year before Hadlee retired in 1990. Cairns, one of New Zealand's best all-rounders, led the 1990s bowling attack with Danny Morrison. Stephen Fleming, New Zealand's most prolific scorer, led the batting and the team into the 21st century. Nathan Astle and Craig McMillan also scored plenty of runs for New Zealand, but both retired earlier than expected.

Daniel Vettori made his debut as an 18-year-old in 1997, and when he took over from Fleming as captain in 2007 he was regarded as the best spinning all-rounder in world cricket. On 26 August 2009, Daniel Vettori became the eighth player and second left-arm bowler (after Chaminda Vaas) in history to take 300 wickets and score 3000 test runs, joining the illustrious club. Vettori decided to take an indefinite break from international short form cricket in 2011 but continued to represent New Zealand in Test cricket and returned for the 2015 Cricket World Cup.

On 4 April 1996, New Zealand achieved a unique world record, where the whole team was adjudged Man of the Match for team performance against 4-run victory over the West Indies. This is recorded as the only time where whole team achieved such an award.

3 April 1996
Scorecard

New Zealand; 158 (35.5 overs)	v	West Indies; 154 (49.1 overs)
Craig Spearman 41 (39); Laurie Williams 3/16 (4.5 overs)		Roland Holder 49* (86); Chris Cairns 2/17 (5.1 overs)

New Zealand won by 4 runs
Bourda, Georgetown, Guyana
Umpires: Clyde Duncan (WI) and Eddie Nicholls (WI)
Player of the match: New Zealand team (all players)

- West Indies won the toss and elected to field.

=== 21st century ===
New Zealand started the new millennium by winning the 2000 ICC KnockOut Trophy in Kenya to claim their first ICC tournament. This was a knockout tournament where teams were seeded according to their performance in Cricket World Cup 1999, the top five teams from that world cup gained direct entry to quarter-finals and while remaining six teams had to play the pre-quarter finals. New Zealand gained direct entry to quarter-finals where they faced Zimbabwe against whom they had recently lost an ODI series, after a nervy start they pulled things back and romped to a crushing 64-run victory to get through to the semis. In semis they faced Pakistan, a team who had managed to knock New Zealand out from last World Cup at this very stage. New Zealand beat Pakistan this time in a thrilling run-chase to enter the final. In the final, they faced India who had knocked out world champions Australia and defending champions South Africa. New Zealand won the toss and opted to bowl but the decision seemed to backfire as India romped to a 141 run opening partnership in 27 overs, New Zealand somehow managed to pull things back but the target was a daunting 265, and in reply they struggled for the most part of their innings but in the end, it was a 122-run partnership between Chris Cairns and Chris Harris that took them close the target before Cairns finished the game with two balls to spare as New Zealand won its first-ever ICC event.

15 October 2000
Scorecard

India; 264/6 (50 overs)	v	New Zealand; 265/6 (49.4 overs)
Sourav Ganguly 117 (130); Scott Styris 2/53 (10 overs)		Chris Cairns 102* (113); Venkatesh Prasad 3/27 (7 overs)

New Zealand won by 4 wickets (with 2 balls remaining)
Gymkhana Club Ground, Nairobi Kenya
Umpires: Steve Bucknor (WI) and David Shepherd (Eng)
Player of the match: Chris Cairns (NZ)

- New Zealand won the toss and elected to field.
- New Zealand won the 2000 ICC Knockout Trophy.

Shane Bond played 18 Tests for NZ between 2001 and 2009 but missed far more through injury. When fit, he added a dimension to the NZ bowling attack that had been missing since Hadlee retired, taking 87 wickets at an average of 22.09.

Vettori stood down as Test captain in 2011 leading to star batsman Ross Taylor to take his place. Taylor led New Zealand for a year which included a thrilling win in a low scoring Test match against Australia in Hobart, their first win over Australia since 1993. In 2012/13 Brendon McCullum became captain and new players such as Kane Williamson, Corey Anderson, Doug Bracewell, Trent Boult and Jimmy Neesham emerged as world-class performers. McCullum captained New Zealand to series wins against the West Indies and India in 2013/14 and both Pakistan and Sri Lanka in 2014/15 increasing New Zealand's rankings in both Test and ODI formats. In the series against India McCullum scored 302 at Wellington to become New Zealand's first Test triple centurion.

In early 2015 New Zealand made the final of the Cricket World Cup, going through the tournament undefeated until the final, where they lost to Australia by seven wickets. In 2015 the New Zealand national cricket team played under the name of Aotearoa for their first match against Zimbabwe to celebrate Māori Language Week.

In mid-2015 New Zealand toured England, performing well, drawing the Test series 1–1, and losing the One Day series, 2–3. From October to November 2015, and in February 2016, New Zealand played Australia in two Test Series, three and two games respectively. With a changing of an era in the Australian team, New Zealand was rated as a chance of winning especially in New Zealand. New Zealand lost both series by 2–0

In February 2016, Kane Williamson was appointed as the captain of the team after Brendon McCullum's retirement who played his 101st and final ever test against Australia at Christchurch. Williamson's first international series as the full-time captain was Men's T20 World Cup 2016 in India in which the team won all four of its group games but lost to England in the semi-final at Delhi. After the annual rankings update on 4 May 2016 the team was awarded the No. 1 ranking in T20Is. The team then got into a rough patch after the T20 World Cup, where they would go onto lose away series to South Africa, India and Australia. In their home season they managed to beat Pakistan for the first time in a Test series in 32 years, whitewashed Bangladesh across formats, won the Chappell-Hadlee Trophy against Australia but went onto lose to South Africa in T20I, ODI and Test series.

New Zealand started the 2017 international season with a tri-series involving hosts Ireland, and Bangladesh as a preparation for upcoming Champions Trophy in England. New Zealand managed to win the tri-series as they finished at the top of the points table but the Champions Trophy turned out to be a disastrous campaign as they got knocked out by Bangladesh and ended the tournament without a single win, the worst performance for them in an ICC Event. After that the team had to wait four months for their next tour which was to India in which both the ODI and T20I series were closely contested but New Zealand lost both by a scoreline of 2–1. The home season started with whitewash of the West Indies across formats followed by whitewash of Pakistan in the ODI series but after that New Zealand lost the T20I series to Pakistan and in the process lost their No. 1 ranking in T20Is. Then they took part in the first ever T20I tri-series involving full-members the Trans-Tasman T20I Tri-Series in which they ended up runners-up to Australia and England finished third. Then they played England where they lost the ODI series but then managed to win the test series. This was their first test series win against England after 19 years and 4th overall in their 87 year old rivalry.

In 2018–19 they began with a tour of UAE in to play Pakistan. The tour started with New Zealand suffering a whitewash in the T20I series but they drew the ODI series, 1–1. New Zealand produced a stunning act of resilience to register their first away test series win against Pakistan after 49 years. This put New Zealand 3rd on the test rankings table. After this in their home season they beat Sri Lanka across formats, lost to India in the ODI series before managing to beat them in the T20I series and lastly they beat Bangladesh across formats and consequently they climbed to No. 2 spot in Test rankings.

New Zealand started the 2019 season with the Cricket World Cup in England & Wales. New Zealand had an impressive start to their World Cup campaign as they remained unbeaten and top of the table for their first six games. Their formed dipped after that initial burst as they managed to lose their next three group games convincingly and only just managed to get through to the semi-finals on net run-rate. In the semi-final, they stunned favourites India on the reserve day to reach a second consecutive final. In the final, the scores were tied after 50 overs and again after the Super Over. England won by having hit more boundaries. This boundary countback rule was criticised and a couple of months later ICC abolished the rule.

In December 2022, Kane Williamson stepped down as Test captain and was replaced by Tim Southee; Williamson remained white-ball captain. On 4 June 2025, Gary Stead was let go as head coach, as NZ Cricket opted to keep a single coach to oversee all three formats. On 6 June 2025, Rob Walter was named as his successor.

In November 2024, New Zealand won their first ever test series in India 3–0 to break India's 12 year test series winning streak at home, and inflict India's first clean sweep home defeat since 2000. In November 2025, after helping his team whitewash England and West Indies, Daryl Mitchell became the second New Zealand cricketer (second only to Glenn Turner) to become the top ranked ODI batsman. In January 2026, New Zealand won their first ever ODI series in India aided by Mitchell who scored 352 runs in the 3 matches, including back to back match winning centuries with Glenn Phillips also scoring a century in the decider. From this series, Daryl Mitchell rose to being the number 1 ranked ODI batsman for the second time.

== International grounds ==
Locations of all stadiums which have hosted a men's international cricket match within New Zealand since 2018

Listed chronologically in order of first match. Neutral fixtures such as World Cup and World Cup Qualifier games are included.

Venue	City	Representative team	Capacity	Years used	Test	ODI	T20I
Current venues
Basin Reserve	Wellington	Wellington	11,600	1930–2025	70	31	—
Eden Park	Auckland	Auckland	42,000	1930–2025	50	80	32
McLean Park	Napier	Central Districts	19,700	1979–2025	10	47	6
Seddon Park	Hamilton	Northern Districts	10,000	1981–2025	29	43	13
Wellington Regional Stadium	Wellington	Wellington	34,500	2000–2025	—	32	17
John Davies Oval	Queenstown	Otago	19,000	2003–2023	—	9	1
University Oval	Dunedin	Otago	6,000	2008–2025	8	12	5
Saxton Oval	Nelson	Central Districts	6,000	2014–2025	—	12	5
Hagley Oval	Christchurch	Canterbury	18,000	2014–2025	15	17	14
Bay Oval	Tauranga	Northern Districts	10,000	2014–2025	6	13	18
Former venues
Lancaster Park	Christchurch	Canterbury	38,628	1930–2011	40	48	4
Carisbrook	Dunedin	Otago	29,000	1955–2004	10	21	—
Pukekura Park	New Plymouth	Central Districts		1992	—	1	—
Owen Delany Park	Taupo	Northern Districts	15,000	1999–2001	—	3	—
Cobham Oval	Whangarei	Northern Districts	5,500	2012–2017	—	2	—
Bert Sutcliffe Oval	Lincoln	New Zealand Academy		2014	—	2	—
As of 22 December 2025

== Current squad ==
New Zealand Cricket released the list of their 2025–2026 national contracts on 3 June 2025.

This is a list of every active player who is contracted to New Zealand Cricket, has played for New Zealand since February 2025 or was named in the recent Test, ODI or T20I squads. Uncapped players are listed in italics.

Last updated: 5 February 2026

- Forms – This refers to the forms they've played for New Zealand in the past year, not over their whole New Zealand career
- No. – Shirt number
- C – Contracted to New Zealand Cricket (Y = Holds contract)

Name	Age	Batting style	Bowling style	Domestic team	Forms	No.	C	Captaincy	Last Test	Last ODI	Last T20I
Batters
Muhammad Abbas	22	Right-handed	Left-arm medium fast	Wellington	ODI	41	Y		–	(Bangladesh) 2026	–
Finn Allen	27	Right-handed	–	Auckland	T20I	16	Y		–	(India) 2026	(India) 2026
Bevon Jacobs	24	Right-handed	–	Auckland	T20I	70			–	–	(India) 2026
Nick Kelly	33	Left-handed	–	Wellington	ODI	55			–	(India) 2026	–
Rhys Mariu	24	Right-Handed	–	Canterbury	ODI	25			–	(Pakistan) 2025	–
Henry Nicholls	35	Left-handed	–	Canterbury	Test, ODI	86	Y		(Zimbabwe) 2025	(India) 2026	(Bangladesh) 2021
Tim Robinson	24	Right-handed	–	Wellington	T20I	33			–	(Sri Lanka) 2024	(Cricket West Indies) 2025
Will Young	33	Right-handed	–	Central Districts	Test, ODI	32	Y		(Cricket West Indies) 2025	(India) 2026	(Sri Lanka) 2024
All-rounders
Michael Bracewell	35	Left-handed	Right-arm off spin	Wellington	Test, ODI, T20I	4	Y		(Cricket West Indies) 2025	(India) 2026	(Cricket West Indies) 2025
Mark Chapman	32	Left-handed	Slow left-arm orthodox	Auckland	ODI, T20I	80	Y		–	(Cricket West Indies) 2025	(India) 2026
Zak Foulkes	24	Right-handed	Right-arm medium	Canterbrury	Test, ODI, T20I	35	Y		(Cricket West Indies) 2025	(India) 2026	(India) 2026
Daryl Mitchell	35	Right-handed	Right-arm medium	Canterbury	Test, ODI, T20I	75	Y		(Cricket West Indies) 2025	(India) 2026	(India) 2026
James Neesham	36	Left-handed	Right-arm medium fast	Wellington	T20I	50			(South Africa) 2017	(South Africa) 2023	(Cricket West Indies) 2025
Glenn Phillips	29	Right-handed	Right-arm off spin	Otago	Test, ODI, T20I	23	Y		(Cricket West Indies) 2025	(India) 2026	(India) 2026
Rachin Ravindra	27	Left-handed	Slow left-arm orthodox	Wellington	Test, ODI, T20I	8	Y		(Cricket West Indies) 2025	(Cricket West Indies) 2025	(India) 2026
Mitchell Santner	34	Left-handed	Slow left-arm orthodox	Northern Districts	Test, ODI, T20I	74	Y	ODI, T20I (C)	(Zimbabwe) 2025	(India) 2026	(India) 2026
Nathan Smith	28	Right-handed	Right-arm medium-fast	Wellington	Test, ODI	10	Y		(Cricket West Indies) 2025	(Cricket West Indies) 2025	–
Wicket-keeper-batters
Tom Blundell	36	Right-handed	Right-arm off spin	Wellington	Test	66	Y		(Cricket West Indies) 2025	(Bangladesh) 2023	(Pakistan) 2024
Devon Conway	35	Left-handed	–	Wellington	Test, ODI, T20I	88	Y		(Cricket West Indies) 2025	(India) 2026	(India) 2026
Mitchell Hay	26	Right-handed	–	Canterbury	Test, ODI, T20I	81	Y		(Cricket West Indies) 2025	(India) 2026	(Cricket West Indies) 2025
Tom Latham	34	Left-handed	–	Canterbury	Test, ODI	48	Y	Test (C)	(Cricket West Indies) 2025	(India) 2026	(Pakistan) 2023
Tim Seifert	31	Right-handed	–	Northern Districts	ODI, T20I	43	Y		–	(India) 2026	(India) 2026
Pace Bowlers
Kristian Clarke	25	Right-handed	Right-arm medium	Northern Districts	ODI, T20I	34			–	(India) 2026	(India) 2026
Jacob Duffy	32	Right-handed	Right-arm fast medium	Otago	Test, ODI, T20I	27	Y		(Cricket West Indies) 2025	(India) 2026	(India) 2026
Matthew Fisher	27	Right-handed	Right-arm fast medium	Northern Districts	Test, ODI	30			(Zimbabwe) 2025	(India) 2026	–
Lockie Ferguson	35	Right-handed	Right-arm fast	Auckland	T20I	69	Y		(Australia) 2019	(India) 2023	(India) 2026
Matt Henry	34	Right-handed	Right-arm fast medium	Canterbury	Test, ODI, T20I	21	Y		(Cricket West Indies) 2025	(India) 2026	(India) 2026
Kyle Jamieson	31	Right-handed	Right-arm fast medium	Canterbury	ODI, T20I	12	Y		(South Africa) 2024	(India) 2026	(India) 2026
Adam Milne	34	Right-handed	Right-arm fast	Central Districts	T20I	20			–	(Sri Lanka) 2024	(South Africa) 2025
Will O'Rourke	25	Right-handed	Right-arm fast	Canterbury	Test, ODI, T20I	2	Y		(Zimbabwe) 2025	(Pakistan) 2025	(Zimbabwe) 2025
Michael Rae	31	Right-handed	Right-arm medium fast	Canterbury	Test	37			(Cricket West Indies) 2025	–	–
Ben Sears	28	Right-handed	Right-arm medium fast	Wellington	ODI, T20I	14	Y		(Australia) 2024	(Pakistan) 2025	(Australia) 2025
Blair Tickner	33	Right-handed	Right-arm medium fast	Central Districts	ODI	13			(Sri Lanka) 2023	(India) 2026	(Pakistan) 2023
Spin Bowlers
Adithya Ashok	24	Right-handed	Right-arm leg spin	Central Districts	ODI	1	Y		–	(India) 2026	(United Arab Emirates) 2023
Ajaz Patel	38	Left-handed	Slow left-arm orthodox	Central Districts	Test	24			(Cricket West Indies) 2025	–	(Bangladesh) 2021
Ish Sodhi	34	Right-handed	Right-arm leg spin	Northern Districts	T20I	61			(India) 2024	(Sri Lanka) 2024	(India) 2026

== Coaching staff ==
Position	Name
Team manager	
Head coach	rob walter
Batting coach	bj watling
Bowling coach	jacob oram
Fielding coach	
Physiotherapist	Tommy Simsek
Strength and conditioning coach	Chris Donaldson

=== Coaching history ===
- 1985–1987: Glenn Turner
- 1987–1990: Bob Cunis
- 1990–1993: Warren Lees
- 1993–1995: Geoff Howarth
- 1995–1996: Glenn Turner
- 1996–1999: Steve Rixon
- 1999–2001: David Trist
- 2001–2003: Denis Aberhart
- 2003–2008: John Bracewell
- 2008–2009: Andy Moles
- 2010: Mark Greatbatch
- 2010–2012: John Wright
- 2012–2018: Mike Hesson
- 2018–2025: Gary Stead
- 2025–present: Rob Walter

== Team colours ==
Period	Kit manufacturer	Sponsor (chest)	Sponsor (sleeves)
1980–1989	Adidas		
1990	Adidas	DB Draught	
1991		DB Draught	
1992	ISC	DB Draught	
1993–1994	ISC	DB Draught	Bank of New Zealand
1995–1996	ISC		DB Draught
1997	ISC	Bank of New Zealand	DB Draught
1998	Canterbury	Bank of New Zealand	TelstraClear
1999	Asics	Bank of New Zealand	TelstraClear
2000	WStar	TelstraClear	
2001–2005	WStar	National Bank of New Zealand	TelstraClear
2006–2008	WStar	National Bank of New Zealand	
2009	WStar	National Bank of New Zealand	Dheeraj & East Coast
2010	Canterbury	National Bank of New Zealand	Dheeraj & East Coast
2011–2014	Canterbury	National Bank of New Zealand	Ford
2015–2016	Canterbury	ANZ	Ford
2017	Canterbury	ANZ	ANZ
2018–2024	Canterbury	ANZ	ANZ
2024	Castore	ANZ	ANZ

New Zealand's kit is manufactured by Canterbury of New Zealand, who replaced previous manufacturer WStar in 2009. When playing Test cricket, New Zealand's cricket whites feature logo of the sponsors Gillette on the left of the shirt, the ANZ logo on the left sleeve and on the middle of the shirt and the Canterbury logo on the right sleeve. New Zealand fielders may wear a black cap (in the style of a baseball cap rather than the baggy cap worn by some teams) or a white sun hat with the New Zealand Cricket logo in the middle. Helmets are also coloured black (although until 1996, they used to be white with the silver fern logo encased in a black circle).

In limited overs cricket, New Zealand's ODI and Twenty20 shirts feature the ANZ logo across the centre, with the silver fern badge on the left of the shirt, Canterbury logo on the right sleeve and the Ford logo on the right. In ODIs, the kit comprises a black shirt with blue accents and black trousers, whilst the Twenty20 kit comprises a beige shirt with black accents and black trousers. In ICC limited-overs tournaments, a modified kit design is used with sponsor's logos moving to the sleeve and 'NEW ZEALAND' printed across the front.

In ODI, New Zealand wore Beige and brown between 1980 World Series Cricket and 1988 World Series Cricket. The 1983–1984 version was made popular by the Black Caps supporter group Beige Brigade, who sells the version of this uniform to the general public together with a "moral contract" which explains the expectations that come with being a Beige Brigadier. and was also worn in the inaugural Twenty20 international between New Zealand and Australia. Between 1991 and 1997 grey or silver (with some splashes of black or white) was worn instead. Until 2000, the ODI uniform was teal with black accents.

Previous suppliers were Adidas (World Series Cricket 1980–1990), ISC (World Cup World Cup 1992 and 1996, World Series 1993–97) Canterbury (1998–1999), Asics (who supplied all the 1999 Cricket World Cup participating teams) and WStar (2000–2009).

Previous sponsors were DB Draught (1990–1994 in the front, 1995–1997 in the sleeve), Bank of New Zealand (1993–94 and 1997–99 in the front), Clear Communications, later TelstraClear (1997–2000 in the front, 2001–2005 in the sleeve), National Bank of New Zealand (2000–2014) and Dheeraj and East Coast (2009–2010), since 2014 ANZ is the current sponsor, due to National Bank's rebranding as ANZ. Amul became the new sponsor in May 2017 for the ICC CT.

ICC World Cup 2023 started on 5 October 2023. They have ended their journey to this tournament by getting defeated to India by 70 runs in the semi-final.

In December 2023, there had been a six-year deal with Castore to manufacture their kits starting from October 2024.

== Tournament history ==
Key
Champions
Runners-up
Semi-Finalists

=== Cricket World Cup ===
Edition	Round	Position	P	W	L	T	NR	Squad	Ref
(England) 1975	Semi Finals	4/8	4	2	2	0	0	Squad	
(England) 1979	Semi Finals	4/8	4	2	2	0	0	Squad	
(England) (Wales) 1983	Group Stage	5/8	6	3	3	0	0	Squad	
(India) (Pakistan) 1987	Group Stage	6/8	6	2	4	0	0	Squad	
(Australia) (New Zealand) 1992	Semi Finals	3/9	9	7	2	0	0	Squad	
(India) (Pakistan) (Sri Lanka) 1996	Quarter Finals	7/12	6	3	3	0	0	Squad	
(England) (Republic of Ireland) (Netherlands) (Scotland) (Wales) 1999	Semi Finals	4/12	9	4	4	0	1	Squad	
(South Africa) (Zimbabwe) (Kenya) 2003	Super Six	5/14	8	5	3	0	0	Squad	
(Cricket West Indies) 2007	Semi Finals	3/16	10	7	3	0	0	Squad	
(India) (Sri Lanka) (Bangladesh) 2011	Semi Finals	4/14	8	5	3	0	0	Squad	
(Australia) (New Zealand) 2015	Runners Up	2/14	9	8	1	0	0	Squad	
(England) (Wales) 2019	Runners Up	2/10	10	6	3	1	0	Squad	
(India) 2023	Semi Finals	4/10	10	5	5	0	0	Squad	
(South Africa) (Zimbabwe) (Namibia) 2027	Qualified								
(India) (Bangladesh) 2031	To be determined								
Total	2 Finals	7/20	99	59	38	1	1		

=== T20 World Cup ===
Edition	Round	Position	P	W	L	T	NR	Squad	Ref
(South Africa) 2007	Semi-finals	4/12	6	3	3	0	0	Squad	
(England) 2009	Super 8s	5/12	5	2	3	0	0	Squad	
(Cricket West Indies) 2010	Super 8s	5/12	5	3	2	0	0	Squad	
(Sri Lanka) 2012	Super 8s	7/12	5	1	2	2	0	Squad	
(Bangladesh) 2014	Super 10	6/16	4	2	2	0	0	Squad	
(India) 2016	Semi-finals	3/16	5	4	1	0	0	Squad	
(United Arab Emirates) (Oman) 2021	Runners-up	2/16	7	5	2	0	0	Squad	
(Australia) 2022	Semi-finals	4/16	5	3	2	0	0	Squad	
(Cricket West Indies) (United States) 2024	Group Stage	10/20	4	2	2	0	0	Squad	
(India) (Sri Lanka) 2026	Runners-up	2/20	9	5	3	0	1	Squad	
(Australia) (New Zealand) 2028	Qualified as co-hosts								
(England) (Wales) (Scotland) (Republic of Ireland) 2030	To be determined								
Total	2 Finals	7/25	55	30	22	2	1		

=== World Test Championship ===
Edition	League stage										Final		
Edition	Pos	Matches					Ded	PC	Pts	PCT	Venue	Result	Ref
Edition	Pos	P	W	L	D	T	Ded	PC	Pts	PCT	Venue	Result	Ref
2019–21	2/9	11	7	4	0	0	0	600	420	70.00	(England) Rose Bowl	(India); W 8 wickets	
2021–23	6/9	13	4	6	3	0	0	156	60	38.46	(England) The Oval	Did Not Qualify	
2023–25	4/9	14	7	7	0	0	3	168	81	48.21	(England) Lord’s	Did Not Qualify	
2025–27	1/9	6	4	1	1	0	0	72	52	72.22	(England) The Oval	TBD	

=== Champions Trophy ===
Edition	Round	Position	P	W	L	T	NR	Squad	Ref
(Bangladesh) 1998	Quarter Finals	7/9	2	1	1	0	0	Squad	
(Kenya) 2000	Champions	1/11	3	3	0	0	0	Squad	
(Sri Lanka) 2002	Group Stage	8/12	2	1	1	0	0	Squad	
(England) 2004	Group Stage	5/12	2	1	1	0	0	Squad	
(India) 2006	Semi Finals	4/10	4	2	2	0	0	Squad	
(South Africa) 2009	Runners Up	2/8	5	3	2	0	0	Squad	
(England) (Wales) 2013	Group Stage	5/8	3	1	1	0	1	Squad	
(England) (Wales) 2017	Group Stage	8/8	3	0	2	0	1	Squad	
(Pakistan) (United Arab Emirates) 2025	Runners Up	2/8	5	3	2	0	0	Squad	
(India) 2029	To be determined								
Total	1 Title	3/14	29	15	12	0	2		

=== Commonwealth Games ===
==== Kuala Lumpur 1998 ====
Group stage				Semifinal	Final/BM	
Opposition Result	Opposition Result	Opposition Result	Rank	Opposition Result	Opposition Result	Rank
(Kenya) KEN; W 5 wickets	(Scotland) SCO; W 177 runs	(Pakistan) PAK; W 81 runs	1 Q	(Australia) AUS; L 9 wickets	(Sri Lanka) SL; W 51 runs	3rd place, bronze medalist(s)

== Honours ==
=== ICC ===
- World Test Championship
  - Champions (1): 2019–2021
- World Cup
  - Runners-up (2): 2015, 2019
- T20 World Cup
  - Runners-up (2): 2021, 2026
- Champions Trophy
  - Champions (1): 2000
  - Runners-up (2): 2009, 2025

=== Others ===
- Commonwealth Games
  - Bronze medal (1): 1998

== Result summary ==
=== Test matches ===
Opposition	Span	Series								Matches								
Opposition	Span	P	W	L	D	W/L	%W	%L	%D	P	W	L	D	T	W/L	%W	%L	%D
Australia	1946–2024	22	2	15	5	0.13	9.09	68.18	22.72	62	8	36	18	0	0.22	12.90	58.06	29.03
Bangladesh	2001–2023	9	6	0	3	—	66.66	0.00	33.33	19	14	2	3	0	7.00	73.68	10.52	15.78
England	1930–2026	41	7	25	9	0.24	17.07	60.97	21.95	118	16	55	47	0	0.29	13.55	46.61	39.83
India	1955–2024	22	7	12	3	0.58	31.81	54.54	13.63	65	16	22	27	0	0.72	24.61	33.84	41.53
Ireland	2026–2026	—	—	—	—	—	—	—	—	1	1	0	0	0	—	100.00	0.00	0.00
Pakistan	1955–2023	22	5	10	7	0.50	22.72	45.45	31.81	62	14	25	23	0	0.56	22.58	40.32	37.09
South Africa	1932–2024	17	1	12	4	0.08	5.88	70.59	23.53	49	7	26	16	0	0.26	14.28	53.06	32.65
Sri Lanka	1983–2024	18	8	5	5	1.60	44.44	27.77	27.77	40	18	11	11	0	1.63	45.00	27.50	27.50
West Indies	1952–2025	19	9	6	4	1.50	47.36	31.57	21.05	52	19	13	20	0	1.46	36.53	25.00	38.46
Zimbabwe	1992–2025	8	6	0	2	—	75.00	0.00	25.00	19	13	0	6	0	—	68.42	0.00	31.57
Summary	1930–2026	178	51	85	42	0.60	28.65	47.75	23.59	487	126	190	171	0	0.66	25.87	39.01	35.11
Last updated: 29 June 2026 Source: ESPNCricInfo

* Only bilateral series designated to be of 2 or more matches are included here. One-off matches are not credited as a bilateral series.

=== ODI matches ===
Opposition	Span	Series								Matches							
Opposition	Span	P	W	L	D	W/L	%W	%L	%D	P	W	L	T	Tie+W	Tie+L	N/R	%W
Afghanistan	2015–2023	0	—	—	—	—	—	—	—	3	3	0	0	0	0	0	100.0
Australia	1974–2023	18	3	11	4	0.27	16.67	61.11	22.22	142	39	96	0	0	0	7	28.89
Bangladesh	1990–2026	12	9	3	0	3.00	75.00	25.00	0.00	49	35	13	0	0	0	1	72.92
Canada	2003–2011	0	—	—	—	—	—	—	—	3	3	0	0	0	0	0	100.0
East Africa	1975–1975	0	—	—	—	—	—	—	—	1	1	0	0	0	0	0	100.0
England	1973–2025	21	8	10	3	0.80	38.09	47.62	14.29	99	48	44	2	0	1	4	52.10
India	1975–2026	18	7	9	2	0.77	38.88	50.00	11.11	123	52	63	1	0	0	7	45.26
Ireland	2007–2022	1	1	0	0	—	100.0	0.00	0.00	7	7	0	0	0	0	0	100.0
Kenya	2007–2011	0	—	—	—	—	—	—	—	2	2	0	0	0	0	0	100.0
Netherlands	1996–2023	1	1	0	0	—	100.0	0.00	0.00	5	5	0	0	0	0	0	100.0
Pakistan	1973–2025	22	12	8	2	1.50	54.54	36.36	9.09	122	57	61	1	0	0	3	48.32
Scotland	1999–2022	0	—	—	—	—	—	—	—	4	4	0	0	0	0	0	100.0
South Africa	1992–2025	10	2	8	0	0.20	20.00	80.00	0.00	74	27	42	0	0	0	5	39.13
Sri Lanka	1979–2025	19	11	4	4	2.75	57.89	21.05	21.05	108	54	44	1	0	0	9	55.05
United Arab Emirates	1996-1996	0	—	—	—	—	—	—	—	1	1	0	0	0	0	0	100.0
United States	2004-2004	0	—	—	—	—	—	—	—	1	1	0	0	0	0	0	100.0
West Indies	1975–2026	14	7	6	1	1.17	50.00	42.86	7.14	76	36	33	0	0	0	7	52.17
Zimbabwe	1987–2015	9	6	2	1	3.00	66.66	22.22	11.11	38	27	9	1	0	0	1	74.32
Summary	1973–2026	145	67	61	17	1.10	46.21	42.07	11.72	858	402	405	6	0	1	44	49.81
Last updated: 22 July 2026. Source: ESPNCricInfo

* Only bilateral series designated to be of 2 or more matches have been included here. One-off matches are not credited as a bilateral series.

* "Tie+W" and "Tie+L" indicates matches tied and then won or lost in a tiebreaker such as a bowlout or one-over-eliminator ("Super Over").

* The win percentage excludes no results and counts ties (irrespective of a tiebreaker) as half a win.

* Forfeited matches are not included.

=== T20I matches ===
Opposition	Span	Series								Matches							
Opposition	Span	P	W	L	D	W/L	%W	%L	%D	P	W	L	Tie	Tie+W	Tie+L	N/R	%W
Afghanistan	2021–2026	0	—	—	—	—	—	—	—	3	2	1	0	0	0	0	66.67
Australia	2005–2025	4	1	2	1	0.50	25.00	50.00	25.00	22	5	15	0	1	0	1	26.19
Bangladesh	2010–2026	5	2	1	2	2.00	40.00	20.00	20.00	22	16	5	0	0	0	1	76.19
Canada	2026–2026	0	—	—	—	—	—	—	—	1	1	0	0	0	0	0	100.0
England	2007–2026	6	1	4	1	0.25	16.66	66.66	16.66	31	10	17	0	0	1	3	37.50
India	2007–2026	9	3	6	0	0.50	33.33	66.66	0.00	31	11	17	1	0	2	0	40.32
Ireland	2009–2022	1	1	0	0	—	100.0	0.00	0.00	5	5	0	0	0	0	0	100.0
Kenya	2007-2007	0	—	—	—	—	—	—	—	1	1	0	0	0	0	0	100.0
Namibia	2021-2021	0	—	—	—	—	—	—	—	1	1	0	0	0	0	0	100.0
Netherlands	2014–2022	1	1	0	0	—	100.0	0.00	0.00	3	3	0	0	0	0	0	100.0
Pakistan	2007–2026	11	5	3	3	1.67	45.45	27.27	27.27	50	23	24	0	0	0	3	48.94
Papua New Guinea	2024-2024	0	—	—	—	—	—	—	—	1	1	0	0	0	0	0	100.0
Scotland	2009–2022	1	1	0	0	—	100.0	0.00	0.00	4	4	0	0	0	0	0	100.0
South Africa	2005–2026	4	0	3	1	0.00	0.00	75.00	25.00	25	10	15	0	0	0	0	40.00
Sri Lanka	2006–2026	9	5	1	3	5.00	55.56	11.11	33.33	29	17	9	0	0	2	1	64.28
Uganda	2024-2024	0	—	—	—	—	—	—	—	1	1	0	0	0	0	0	100.0
United Arab Emirates	2023–2026	1	1	0	0	—	100.0	0.00	0.00	4	3	1	0	0	0	0	75.00
West Indies	2006–2025	8	5	1	2	5.00	62.50	12.50	25.00	25	13	6	0	1	2	3	65.91
Zimbabwe	2010–2025	2	2	0	0	—	100.0	0.00	0.00	8	8	0	0	0	0	0	100.0
Summary	2005–2026	62	28	21	13	1.33	45.16	33.87	20.97	267	135	110	1	2	7	12	53.92
Last updated: 2 May 2026. Source: ESPNCricInfo

* Only bilateral series designated to be of 2 or more matches have been included here. One-off matches are not credited as a bilateral series.

* "Tie+W" and "Tie+L" indicates matches tied and then won or lost in a tiebreaker such as a bowlout or one-over-eliminator ("Super Over")

* The win percentage excludes no results and counts ties (irrespective of a tiebreaker) as half a win.

== Records ==
=== Individual records ===
- Richard Hadlee, one of New Zealand and the world's best all-rounders, took the world record for most Test wickets (374) vs India at Bangalore in 1988. Hadlee was the first bowler to reach 400 Test wickets, vs India at Christchurch in 1990, and finished his career with 431 wickets. He subsequently lost the record to Kapil Dev.
- Corey Anderson holds record for the second fastest century in One Day Internationals (or any other format of international cricket). Playing against West Indies, he scored his ton in just 36 balls. Corey Anderson lost the record to AB de Villiers when AB scored a century in just 31 balls against West Indies.
- In a One Day International in 1996, the entire New Zealand team were awarded man of the match against the West Indies, the first such occasion.
- Andrew Jones and Martin Crowe held the highest ever 3rd-wicket partnership in Tests, with 467 against Sri Lanka in 1991, which at the time was the highest partnership for any wicket.
- Brian Hastings and Richard Collinge together scored 151 runs for the 10th-wicket against Pakistan in 1973, the highest 10th-wicket partnership at the time.
- Nathan Astle scored Test cricket's fastest ever double century versus England, at Christchurch in 2002. He scored 200 off 153 balls with the second hundred coming off just 39 deliveries. He was eventually out for 222—the dreaded double Nelson. He knocked the first hundred off 114 balls. Astle smashed the record by 59 balls, previously held by Adam Gilchrist Australia vs South Africa Johannesburg 2002.
- Brendon McCullum holds the world record for the fastest Test hundred in terms of balls faced. It was scored off 54 balls on 20 February 2016, against Australia during his final Test match, in Christchurch.
- Brendon McCullum holds the world record for the most sixes in Test cricket with 107. He passed Adam Gilchrist's record of 100 in his final Test match. This record was also previously held by Chris Cairns.
- Brendon McCullum was the first batsman to score two centuries in Twenty20 International Cricket (116* v. Australia and 123 v. Bangladesh).
- Brendon McCullum held the record for the highest individual score in Twenty20 International cricket, when he scored 123 v. Bangladesh at Pallekele. He lost the record to Aaron Finch who scored 156* against England at Southampton.
- Chris Cairns and his father Lance Cairns are one of the two father-son combinations to each claim 100 Test wickets, South Africa's Peter and Shaun Pollock being the other.
- Martin Guptill scored the highest score in World Cups with 237* in 2015.
- Guptill holds the record for most career runs (2,271) and most sixes (103, equal with Chris Gayle) in Twenty20 Internationals, both records previously held by Brendon McCullum.
- John Bracewell was the first – and so far only – substitute fielder to take four catches in a One Day International, vs Australia in Adelaide on 23 November 1980.
- Daniel Vettori was the first cricketer to take four wickets and score a half-century in each innings of a Test match, a feat he achieved against Bangladesh in October 2008 at Chittagong. His figures were 5/95 and 4/74 with the ball and 55* and 76 with the bat.
- Colin Munro is the first player in to score three Twenty20 International hundreds. This was accomplished on 3 January 2018 against the West Indies when he scored 104 off 88 balls, with 3 fours and 10 sixes.
- Ross Taylor is the first player to have played 100 ODI, Tests and T20Is.
- Chris Harris holds the record for the most ODI caught and bowled dismissals, with 29.

=== Team records ===
- New Zealand has the record of taking the most number of Tests to register their first win in the format (45 Tests)
- New Zealand became the second team after Australia to win their debut ODI (beat Pakistan at Christchurch in 1973)
- New Zealand hosted Australia to play the first-ever T20 international match at Eden Park in Feb 2005
- New Zealand became the sixth team to achieve No. 1 ranking in all three formats by ICC (T20I 2016–2018, Test 2021–2021, ODI 2021–2023)
- New Zealand won the inaugural WTC Title on 23 Jun 2021 beating India at Hampshire Bowl, Southampton
- New Zealand became the first team to appear in two men's Finals in ICC Events in a calendar year (WTC & T20 WC in 2021)
- New Zealand became the first team to whitewash India in India in a Test series of 3 or more matches
- New Zealand has appeared in the joint-most Semi-Finals in ICC ODI & T20I World Cups (14)
- New Zealand has appeared in the joint-fourth Finals in ICC Events (8)
- New Zealand has won two ICC Titles, joint-seventh with South Africa

=== Notable ===
- Ross Taylor has the 8th highest ODI batting average among batsmen to have played at least 100 ODIs, and Kane Williamson has the 10th highest.
- New Zealand dismissed Zimbabwe (Harare 2005) twice in the same day for totals of 59 and 99. Zimbabwe became only the second team (after India at Manchester in 1952) to be dismissed twice in the same day. The whole Test was completed inside two days. This feat was then repeated at Napier in 2012 when NZ dismissed Zimbabwe for 51 and 143 to end the match within three days.
- Kane Williamson holds the record for most centuries by a New Zealander in Tests, with 33.
- Brendon McCullum holds the record for the highest Test innings by a New Zealander of 302 (vs India in 2014). He is currently the only triple centurion from New Zealand.
- Brendon McCullum holds the New Zealand Test record for the most innings of 200 or more, with 4.
- Brendon McCullum scored the fastest World Cup fifty (off 18 balls) for New Zealand in a Pool A Match of 2015 Cricket World Cup against England, beating his own 20-ball record set against Canada in World Cup (2007) earlier.
- Martin Guptill holds the record for the highest One Day International innings by a New Zealander, with 237 not out against West Indies in the 2015 World Cup quarter-final in Wellington.
- Shane Bond took an ODI hat-trick in the last over (innings bowling figures: 10–0–61–4) vs Australia at Hobart in January 2007.
- Tim Southee took a Twenty20 hat-trick, taking 5–18 in the match against Pakistan.
- Colin Munro scored the second fastest T20 International 50, off 14 balls, against Sri Lanka at Eden Park, Auckland on 10 January 2016.
- Chris Harris, Daniel Vettori, Kyle Mills and Chris Cairns are the only New Zealand cricketers to have taken 200 wickets in ODIs.
- Ajaz Patel took all 10 wickets in an innings, being the third international cricketer and first New Zealand cricketer to achieve this feat, after England's Jim Laker and India's Anil Kumble .
- In June 2022 against England, New Zealand scored the fifth-highest team total (553) and second-highest match aggregate (837) in a losing cause in test match history.

== See also ==
- New Zealand Māori cricket team
- List of New Zealand cricketers
- List of New Zealand first-class cricket records
- New Zealand national cricket captains
- New Zealand women's cricket team
- Beige Brigade Black Caps Supporters

Preceded by West Indies	Test match playing teams 10 January 1930	Succeeded by India
