= Dheeraj and East Coast =

Dheeraj and East Coast LLC
- Formation: 1978
- Headquarters: Dubai, United Arab Emirates
- Managing Director: Dheeraj Wadhwan
- Website: www.dheerajeastcoast.com

Dheeraj and East Coast LLC or simply DEC is a real estate developer based in Dubai in United Arab Emirates. This company is a joint venture between Dheeraj Constructions, based in India (mostly Mumbai) and East Coast LLC, based in Dubai City. The company has got experience of about 60 years with each other, according to media reports. Recently DEC acquired nearly 21 projects in the United Arab Emirates which are worth US$1.7 billion. These projects are mostly located in Dubai in areas like Dubai Marina, Business Bay, Culture Village and Jumeirah Village.

Most of their projects in Dubai have been cancelled or left incomplete leaving investors in huge debts

== Awards ==
This company won the Developer’s Commitment to Efficient Buildings award at the Middle East Awards 2000 organised by ITP Business Publishing which is based in United Arab Emirates in the Middle East.

== Sponsorship ==
DEC LLC started sponsoring Cricket in T20 after signing as official sponsor for the Black Caps, New Zealand's National cricket team. It also sponsors Victorian Bushrangers, the domestic cricket team of Australia and Mumbai Indians of the Indian Premier League.

== See also ==
- Real Estate Development
- Real Estate
