= Beige Brigade =

The Beige Brigade is the name of New Zealand Cricket supporters who identify themselves by wearing beige colors. A version of this beige uniform was worn by the New Zealand limited overs cricket team during the early 1980s (in contrast to the more familiar black, which is worn by almost all New Zealand sports teams, including the current cricket team).

== History ==
The Beige Brigade began in 1999 as a group of dedicated New Zealand cricket fans began wearing home sewn beige uniforms to New Zealand matches. These home-made kits echoed the much-maligned official beige team uniform of the 1980s. The uniform become popular as a gesture of solidarity and support for the New Zealand cricket team of the eighties. Today, the Beige Brigade sells the uniforms to the public together with a "moral contract", explaining the supporter's code of conduct.

Such was the impact on the sporting culture of New Zealand, that in 2019 the NZC agreed to have the Black Caps wear a version of the beige uniform for the inaugural Twenty20 international between New Zealand and Australia. Controversy arose later when CEO Martin Snedden told the Brigade's top brass that "NZ Cricket had invested heavily in the black branding for the Black Caps and that a return to beige was completely out of the question." The decision to wear the beige uniforms did not go down well with the members of the Beige Brigade, believing that the decision making omitted members of the Brigade, despite the work done by supporters designing, funding the manufacture of and popularizing the clothing.

The Beige Brigade organizes tours to selected major sporting events as well. The only other overseas Black Caps supporters club is the England-based London New Zealand Cricket Club, notable for their striped blazers that often appear on the camera at Lord's.

Brigadiers are now commonly seen sporting very short shorts known as "Stubbies" and other items such as sweat bands, fluorescent zinc sunblock, and aviator sunglasses that were once staples of New Zealand summer menswear. During 2016 ICC World T20, the new kits also featured the retro beige color, which was the color that was worn when Twenty20 cricket was first introduced.

== See also ==
London New Zealand Cricket Club
