= Palazzo Versace Dubai =

Hotel in Culture Village, Dubai

Palazzo Versace
- Interactive map of the Palazzo Versace area

General information
- Location: Dubai Creek, Dubai, UAE
- Coordinates: 25.2272951°N 55.3419167°E

Technical details
- Floor count: 10
- Floor area: 37,224 square meters (400,680 sq ft)

Design and construction
- Architect: Spatium
- Developer: ENSHAA PSC

Other information
- Number of rooms: 146
- Number of suites: 69

Website
- Palazzoversace.ae versace.com

Palazzo Versace Dubai is a hotel and resort completed in Culture Village on the foreshore of Dubai Creek in Dubai, United Arab Emirates.

In 2024, the resort's owner Emirates PVD went through financial troubles. Palazzo Versace Dubai was put up for an online auction sale on the Emirates Auction website for nearly $380 million (AED1.4 billion).

== Overview ==
Palazzo Versace Dubai is developed on 130,000 square metres (1,400,000 sq ft) and opened in November 2015. It has 215 hotel rooms and suites, 169 residences, and 8 restaurants and bars. The landscaped gardens offer views of the Dubai Creek and skyline.
