= Logos and uniforms of the New York Mets =

New York Mets primary logo, originally designed by cartoonist Ray Gotto in 1962 and slightly revised in 1993 and 1999.

Current Mets uniforms.

The New York Mets, founded in 1962, returned National League baseball to New York following the departure of the Brooklyn Dodgers to Los Angeles and the New York Giants to San Francisco. The Mets' uniform was designed to incorporate elements of both departed clubs, with the Dodgers' royal blue becoming the Mets' primary color and the Giants' orange the trim color, along with the Giants' "NY" crest adopted as the new team's cap logo. The original Mets uniform had a "clean and classic" look that, while it has undergone a number of changes over the course of the team's history, has never been substantially revised. The basic template has always been a conventional short-sleeved baseball uniform with "Mets" in cursive script on a white pinstriped home jersey, and either "NEW YORK" or "Mets" on a gray road jersey, with the lettering and numerals in blue outlined in orange. The most notable variations were the "racing stripe" uniforms of the 1980s and early '90s, and the addition of black as a trim color along with black alternate jerseys and caps that were worn from 1998 through 2011. For 2012, in recognition of its 50th anniversary, the club restored its classic look by removing the black trim from all of its uniforms and phasing out the black jerseys and caps. Since then the club has adopted blue alternate jerseys and caps, revived the black jerseys as an occasional home alternate, and participated in MLB's "City Connect" uniform program, but has generally worn its primary uniform in most games, home and away.

== Primary logo ==
The Mets' primary logo is a circular crest with an orange outline, containing a blue silhouetted representation of New York City's skyline against a white background, with the word "Mets" in orange cursive script outlined in white just below the center of the circle. At the bottom of the circle is a generic image of a suspension bridge in white, symbolizing the joining of New York's five boroughs. The skyline itself includes, from left to right, representations of a church spire (symbolizing Brooklyn, the "borough of churches"), the Williamsburgh Savings Bank building (formerly the tallest building in Brooklyn), the Woolworth Building, the Empire State Building, and the United Nations building. Superimposed over the skyline behind the "Mets" script are orange baseball stitches. The logo was designed by cartoonist Ray Gotto, creator of the Ozark Ike comic strip.

From 1962–1998, the logo had a small interlocking "NY" in orange block letters just to the left of the "Mets" wordmark. It was also slightly revised in 1993 to make the blue one shade darker and adjust the shape of the skyline.

== Current game uniforms ==
=== Home uniforms ===
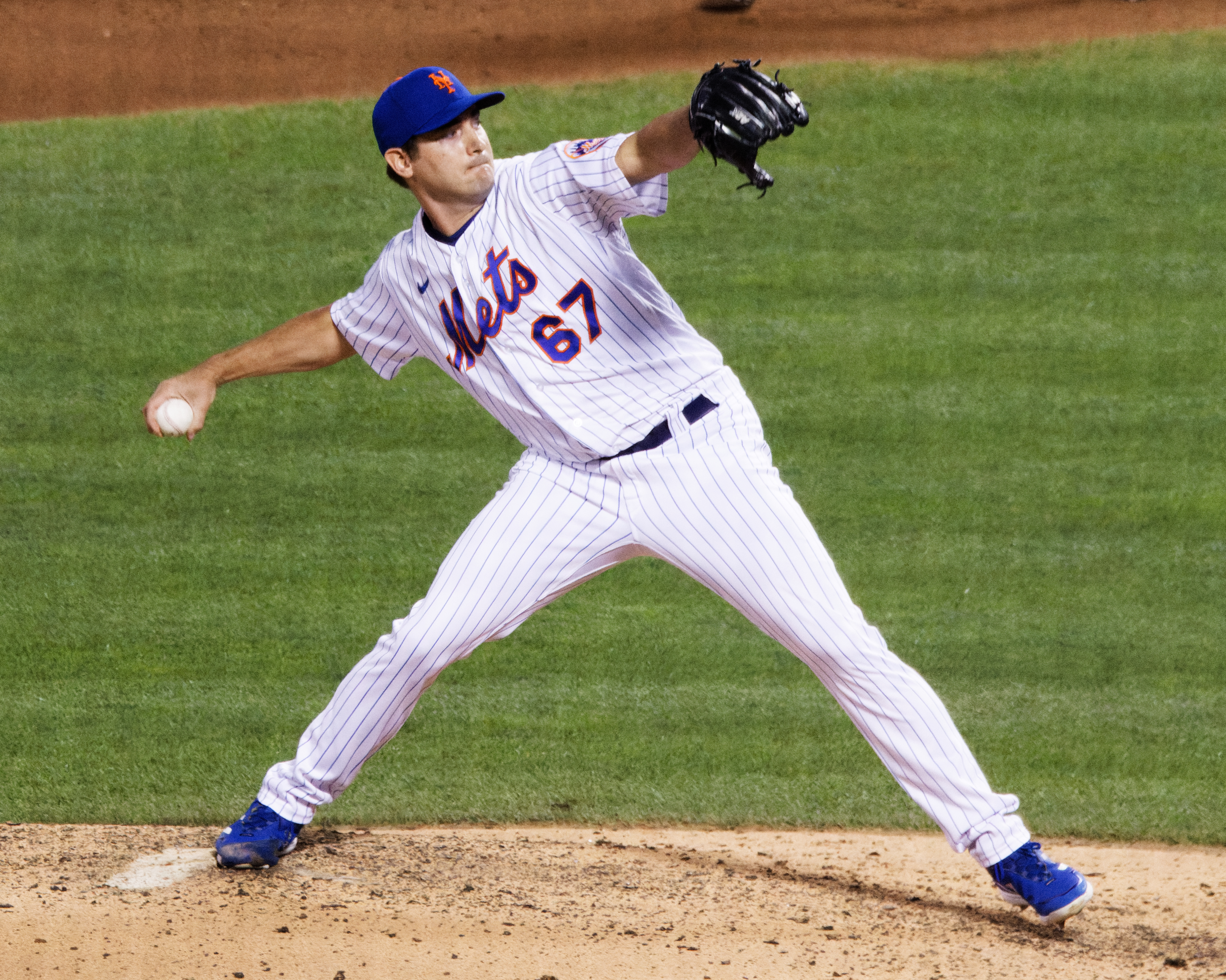

The primary home uniform for the Mets is a white uniform with blue pinstripes, a conventional button-down jersey with short sleeves, and tackle-twill lettering in royal blue outlined in orange. The jersey has the word "Mets" in cursive script across the chest, angled upward, with the player's number in sans-serif block numerals underneath the "-ets" script on the player's left side. On the back of the jersey is the player's number in sans-serif block numerals, with the player's name radially arched above it in block lettering, sewn directly onto the jersey.

The Mets have two sleeve patches: a circular patch depicting the Mets' primary logo, and an advertising patch which is a blue rectangle outlined in orange, horizontally oriented, with the advertiser's logo and wordmark in white lettering. One patch appears on each sleeve; which patch appears on which sleeve depends on the player's handedness, in order to maximize television exposure of the advertisement while the player is at bat. Left-handed batters and pitchers wear the primary-logo patch on the left sleeve (its traditional location) and the ad patch on the right sleeve, as do uniformed non-players such as the manager and coaches; for right-handed batters and pitchers, the ad patch is on the left sleeve and the primary-logo patch is moved to the right sleeve. For switch-hitters, the patch placement depends on the opposing team's starting pitcher; primary on the left, ad on the right against right-handed starters, the opposite against left-handed starters.

The Mets' home uniforms are worn with blue socks, belts, and undersleeves.

=== Road uniforms ===
The Mets' road uniforms are gray with blue lettering and numerals outlined in orange, "NEW YORK" in Tiffany typeface radially arched across the chest, and otherwise featuring the same numerals, lettering, and sleeve patches as the home jerseys. These uniforms were slightly redesigned for 2025, removing the blue piping on the placket, sleeve ends and pants seams that had been in place since 1995 and adding thin blue-orange-blue triple stripes around the collar, sleeve cuffs, and along the pants seams from beltline to cuff. Like the home uniforms, these are worn with blue socks, belts, and undersleeves.

=== Caps ===
New York Mets cap insignia

The Mets' cap, worn at home and on the road, is blue with an orange interlocking "NY" crest on the front panel, and an orange button on top of the crown. The curlicue-style crest is essentially the same as that used by the New York Giants before that franchise relocated to San Francisco following the 1957 season.

The Mets' batting helmets match the primary cap in color and design. In 2020, the orange "NY" logo decal was given a metallic sheen.

=== Alternate uniforms ===
The Mets' home alternate uniform consists of a black jersey with the "Mets" script, numerals and lettering in blue outlined in orange, a black cap with the "NY" logo in blue outlined in orange, and plain white pants with blue piping on the seams. These uniforms are worn with black socks, belts, and undersleeves.

The road alternate jersey is a blue pullover with orange stripes around the collar and sleeve cuffs, with the lettering and numerals in blue outlined in orange. The front of the jersey features a cursive "New York" script that the club previously used on its road jerseys in 1987, with the player's number below "York" on the left side. The road alternates are worn with the blue primary caps and blue accessories.

The Mets also have a "City Connect" uniform, introduced in 2024 as part of an MLB-wide program, consisting of a concrete-gray jersey, white pants, and black caps; the design motif reflects the "concrete jungle" of New York City and the subways and bridges that connect its five boroughs, Queens in particular. The jerseys have wide-spaced black pinstripes consisting of tiny circle and diamond shapes, reflecting the symbols of the MTA's local and express Subway lines; radially arched across the chest are the letters "N Y C" in large black capitals outlined in white, in the same Tiffany typeface as the club's primary road wordmark, and the player's name and number in the same colors and typeface are on the back. On one sleeve is a circular patch in black with a purple outline and the Mets' "NY" cap insignia in purple, the color representing the 7 train which runs past Citi Field; the patch is designed to resemble subway tokens used in the city from 1953-2003. The advertising patch, recolored in black and white, appears on the opposite sleeve. The jerseys also have purple trim around the sleeve cuffs and a purple maker's mark on the upper right chest. The black caps have a purple button on top, the "NY" crest in black outlined in white, and an embroidered image of the Queensboro Bridge in dark gray across the base of the front panel; the bridge's trusses are similarly represented in the sleeve-cuff and pants-seam stripes. The Mets have worn these uniforms with both black and purple undersleeves.

== Uniform history ==
=== Standard uniforms ===
==== 1962–77: Original design ====
The Mets' uniform set in 1962.The primary-logo sleeve patch was added to the home jersey in 1963; numerals appeared on the front of both jerseys beginning in 1965.

The original Mets uniforms from 1962 were of essentially the same design as the team's current primary home uniforms, and the road uniforms used from 2012-2024. The home uniform was white with blue pinstripes, "Mets" script in blue outlined in orange angled upward across the chest, with the player's number on the back of the jersey in blue block numerals outlined in orange, but no player name on the back and no numerals on the front. The cap was blue with the orange "NY" crest on the front panel, the same as the current cap but with a blue button on top of the crown. The road uniform had "NEW YORK" in Tiffany lettering radially arched across the chest, blue placket piping, and also had no player name on the back and no numerals on the front. The primary logo appeared as a patch on the left sleeve of the road jersey in 1962, then was added to the home jersey in 1963.

Apart from the addition of numerals to the front of the jerseys in 1965, underneath the wordmark on the player's left side, and some variations to the numeral typeface, this uniform remained largely unchanged through 1973. A special New York World's Fair patch was worn on the left sleeve in 1964 and '65, in place of the Mets' primary logo. In 1969 the logo patch was supplanted by a patch commemorating the 100th Anniversary of Major League Baseball.

In 1974, the "Mets" script replaced the "NEW YORK" wordmark on the road jersey. The home uniform was unchanged.

On a few occasions in 1976, the Mets wore special "pillbox" caps that had a cylindrical (as opposed to hemispherical) crown and three thin orange horizontal stripes around the cap.

==== 1978–82: Pullovers and player names ====
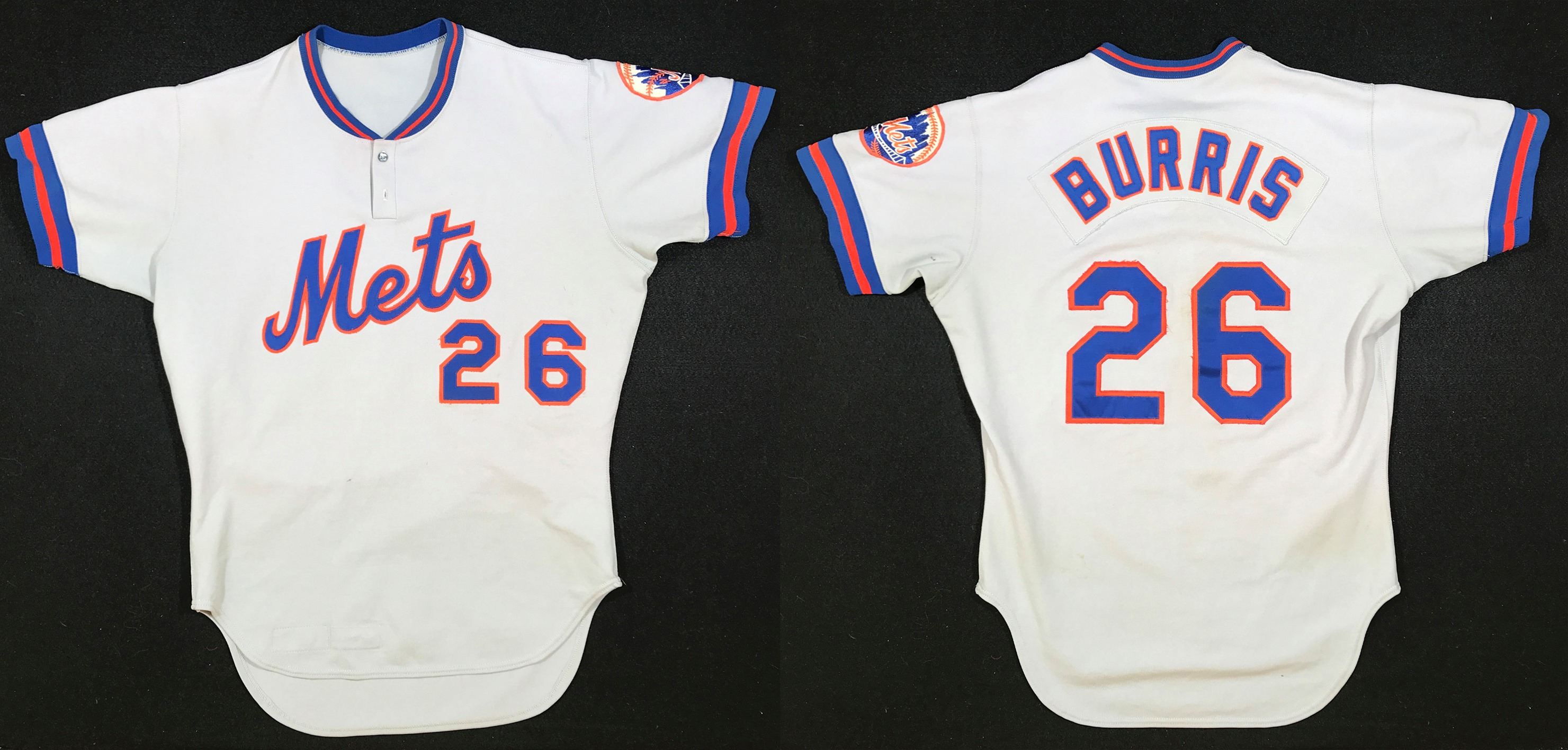
An example of the Mets' Henley-style pullover jerseys; this is the road version worn from 1978-81, with nameplates added in 1979.

In 1978, the home and road jerseys changed from conventional button-down jerseys to Henley-style pullover jerseys, with two buttons just below the collar. The blue piping was removed from the road jerseys. Three thin stripes (blue-orange-blue) were added to the sleeve cuffs and collar on both home and road jerseys, and to the pants seams on the road uniforms. Responsible for the redesign was chairman of the board M. Donald Grant.

In 1979, player names were added to the back of the jerseys, radially arched above the number in blue block letters outlined in orange. The letters were sewn onto an arched fabric "nameplate" (white on the home jerseys, grey on the road jerseys) that was in turn sewn onto the jersey itself.

==== 1982–92: Racing stripes ====
The Mets introduced their "racing stripe" uniforms in 1982–83. This variation was used during their 1986 championship season, although the road jersey had a gray collar which changed to blue in 1987 when the "Mets" script was replaced with a cursive "New York" for one season.

In 1982, the primary logo patch was removed from the left sleeve of both jerseys, and the road uniforms added thick "racing stripes" (blue with orange borders) on the shoulders from neck to sleeve cuff, on the sides of the jerseys from armpit to hip, and along the pants seams from beltline to cuff; the collar and sleeve-cuff striping were removed. The two-button collar was replaced by a gray V-neck. The home jerseys received the same treatment in 1983, adding the "racing stripes" along with a blue V-neck.

From 1982–84, the team occasionally wore blue alternate jerseys on the road. The 1982 blue jersey, worn only rarely, had the "Mets" script, numerals and lettering in orange with gray outline, and orange-blue-orange striping on the collar and sleeve cuffs. For 1983–84, the road blue alternate had the "Mets" script, numerals and lettering in grey with an orange outline, and orange-white-orange collar and sleeve-cuff striping.

In 1986, the team wore a special 25th Anniversary patch on the left sleeve, over the "racing stripes". The patch featured the Mets' primary logo in front of a pair of crossed bats (white with blue accents) in front of a blue diamond shape, with banners on either side reading "1962" (left) and "1986" (right), and "25TH ANNIVERSARY" at the bottom, all outlined in orange.

In 1987, the nameplates were eliminated and the letters of the players' names were sewn directly onto the jerseys. The collar on the road jerseys was changed from gray to blue, and the "Mets" script was replaced with "New York" in cursive script. This was replaced in 1988 by "NEW YORK" in radially-arched block letters (matching the names on the back), with no front numerals. Also in 1988, a thin white outline was added to the wordmark, numerals, lettering, and "racing stripes" on the road jerseys.

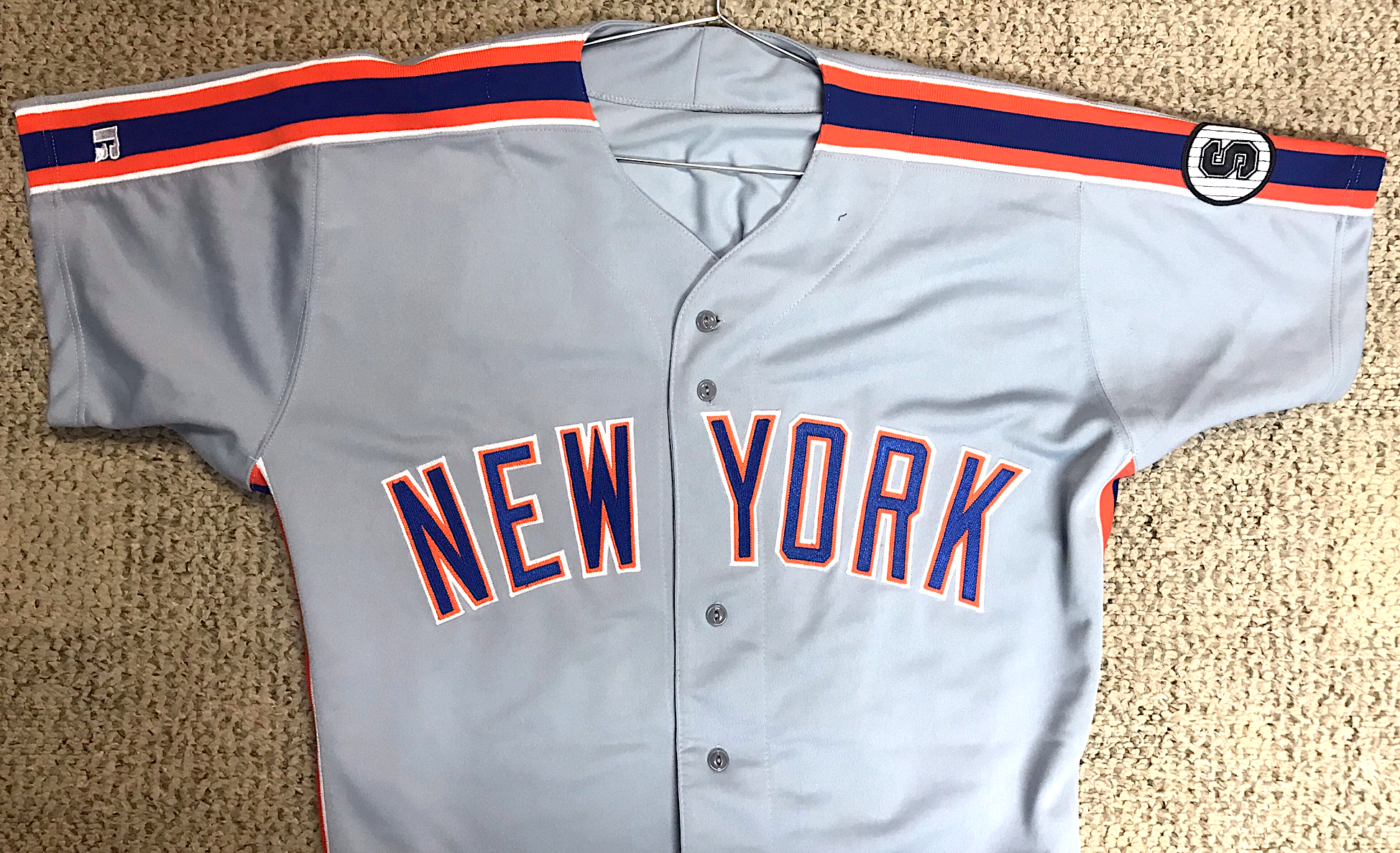
The Mets adopted this "NEW YORK" block wordmark for their road jerseys in 1988, adding white trim and removing the front numerals, and switched from pullovers to button-downs in 1991. The "S" patch on the sleeve was worn in 1992 as a memorial for William Shea.

In 1991, the pullover jerseys became button-down jerseys, resulting in the elimination of the blue collars, and a thin white outline was added to the graphics on the home jerseys.

In 1992, the team wore a patch on the left sleeve, over the "racing stripes", consisting of a white circle with black outline, pinstripes, and the letter "S" in honor of the late William A. Shea, the New York attorney who was instrumental in bringing National League baseball back to New York, and for whom Shea Stadium was named.

==== 1993–94: The "swoosh-tail" ====
The Mets made a brief overhaul that lasted from 1993 to 1994, modifying the home "Mets" script and designing a new road "New York" wordmark, each underlined with a "swoosh-tail." The 1994 road jerseys also had numerals on the front (not shown).

In 1993, the color blue used on the Mets uniforms was changed to a slightly darker shade. The "racing stripes" were removed from both home and road uniforms, and the primary logo returned to the left sleeve. The "Mets" script on the home jersey was modified, and for the first time incorporated a "swoosh-tail" attached to the letter "s" underlining the wordmark. The road jersey had "New York" in cursive script, similar but not identical to the script used in 1987, and also with a "swoosh-tail" attached to the letter "k" underlining the wordmark and passing through the lower loop of the "Y". The road uniform had thin blue-orange-blue striping on the sleeve cuffs and pants seams.

In 1994, player numerals were added to the front of the road jersey, below the wordmark on the player's left side, and the striping was removed from the road uniform. Also in 1994, the primary-logo sleeve patch was modified to incorporate rectangular spaces above and below the circle, containing text commemorating the 25th anniversary of the 1969 "Miracle Mets." On the right sleeve was a patch, worn league-wide, commemorating the 125th Anniversary of Major League Baseball.

==== 1995–97: Back to basics ====
The Mets returned to their traditional uniform design in 1995. The original "Mets" script was restored to the home jersey; the road jersey eliminated the white outlining, revived the original "NEW YORK" wordmark and blue placket piping, and added blue piping above the sleeve cuffs.

In 1997, the blue button on the top of the caps was changed to orange. The Mets introduced an alternate home uniform that was plain white with no pinstripes, and blue piping matching the road uniform. The team also introduced an alternate cap with a white crown and blue bill. The "NY" crest on the alternate cap was blue with an orange outline, and the button on top of the cap was blue. The white cap was worn with the white alternate jersey on some occasions early in the season. Also in 1997, the team wore a patch on the right sleeve of all three jerseys commemorating the 50th anniversary of Jackie Robinson's breaking of Major League Baseball's color barrier.

==== 1998–2011: Mets in black ====
In 1998, a black alternate jersey was introduced, matching the white home alternate in style but with the "Mets" script, numerals and lettering in blue with a white outline and an orange drop-shadow. The black jersey was worn as an alternate at home, paired with the white home alternate pants, and on the road. The team also introduced a black alternate cap with a blue bill, blue button on top, and "NY" crest in blue outlined in orange, to be worn with the black jerseys. The white alternate cap from 1997 was discontinued. A black drop-shadow was added to the script, numerals and lettering on the home white alternate and road gray jerseys.

In 1999, the black drop-shadow was added to the graphics on the home pinstriped uniforms, and a road version of the black alternate jersey (with the "NEW YORK" wordmark) was introduced. An alternate version of the Mets' primary logo, with a black skyline and "Mets" script in blue outlined in white with orange drop-shadow, was also introduced in 1999 and worn on the left sleeve of both black alternate jerseys. A second black alternate cap was added, this one with a black bill, black top-button, and "NY" crest in blue outlined in white with orange drop-shadow (matching the graphics on the black jerseys). This became commonly known as the "solid black cap" or "all-black cap" while the 1998 black alternate cap, which was retained, became known as the "two-tone cap" or "hybrid cap" thanks to its blue bill. Also in 1999, for that season only, the players' names were removed from the back of all three home jerseys.

Although the Mets continued to officially designate the pinstriped uniform as the club's primary home uniform, and the blue cap with the orange crest as its primary cap, the reality of what was worn on the field from 1998 through 2009 was quite different. At some point during the 1998 season, the team began occasionally pairing the two-tone cap, which was designed to be worn with the black jerseys, with the white alternate jerseys and gray road uniforms as well. By the end of the 1998 season the two-tone cap was worn in every road game, and frequently worn at home with the white alternates as well as the black, but not with the pinstripes which still had no black trim. After 1998, the white alternate and two-tone cap became the Mets' de facto primary home uniform, worn in most home games, and by Mets players appearing in All-Star Games in National League parks (except in 2007). Meanwhile, the blue cap was worn only rarely and exclusively at home, except for one road game in 2008; the road gray jerseys were otherwise paired only with the two-tone cap, and the black jerseys with the all-black cap, while the home pinstriped and white uniforms were paired at various times with all three caps. All five uniforms were worn with black socks, belts, and undersleeves; the blue accessories appeared only with the blue caps. In addition, beginning in 2001 when the two-tone cap was designated as the official road cap and until it was discontinued after the 2011 season, the Mets were the only team in MLB to wear its designated road cap at home.

In 2001, following the terrorist attacks of September 11, when play resumed and for the balance of the season all MLB teams including the Mets had an American flag patch sewn onto the back of the collar of all game jerseys. The Mets added embroidery to the right sleeve cuff of all five jerseys showing the phrase "9-11-01" flanked by two American flags. In addition, beginning September 21 at their first home game after the attacks, the Mets wore caps of New York City's first-responder agencies—the Police Department (NYPD), Fire Department (FDNY), Emergency Medical Services (EMS) and Port Authority Police (PAPD)—in place of their regular game caps. The Mets were only permitted to wear these caps during pre-game warmups on September 21 but defied MLB instructions and wore them in game play, that night and for the remainder of the season. All of the first-responder caps were navy blue, with either "NYPD" in white serif lettering, "FDNY" in thick yellow-orange-red gradient lettering, or the EMS or PAPD shield logo on the front panel. Typically, each player and coach chose one of the caps and wore that same one for the balance of the season. These caps did not have corresponding batting helmets; the team used its regular two-tone or black helmets in these games depending on which jersey was worn.

In 2002, the Mets wore a patch on the right sleeve commemorating the club's 40th Anniversary. The "9-11-01" sleeve embroidery was carried over from the previous season.

In 2004, the Mets wore a patch on the right sleeve commemorating the 40th Anniversary of Shea Stadium. Below this patch, embroidered onto the sleeve in black lettering on the pinstriped, white and gray jerseys and white lettering on the black jerseys, was the phrase "Ya Gotta Believe" and the name "TUG", in honor of former Mets pitcher Tug McGraw who died on January 5. Also in 2004, the name of longtime Mets broadcaster Bob Murphy was embroidered on the left sleeve above the primary logo patch after Murphy died on August 3.

Prior to 2006, throughout Mets history, the team's batting helmets were designed to match the caps. The 1976 "pillbox" cap had no corresponding batting helmet, nor did the 1997 white alternate cap (although first baseman John Olerud and catcher Todd Hundley wore white helmets on the field); the team used its standard batting helmets (matching the primary caps) in all games. Beginning in 1998, each alternate cap had a matching corresponding batting helmet with the same crown and bill colors, and the same "NY" logo crest applied as a decal on the front of the helmet. In 2006, however, the club began using the Rawlings Coolflo batting helmet, and changed the design of the two-tone helmet such that the cap and helmet no longer matched. The helmet shell was black; the bill and the front of the crown were painted metallic blue, the area of which conformed to the surface contours of the helmet shell and faded gradually toward the back. The "NY" crest on the front of this helmet was black with a white outline and orange drop-shadow. The blue and all-black helmets received the same metallic paint treatment as the two-tone helmet, but still essentially matched the respective caps as the metallic paint was the same color as the helmet shell and the "NY" logo decals matched the crests on the corresponding caps.

In 2008, the Mets wore a patch on the right sleeve denoting the final season of Shea Stadium. For the team's final home series at Shea in late September, the patch was embroidered on the left side of the caps. Also in 2008, for the first game of a doubleheader on June 27 against the Yankees at Yankee Stadium, the Mets wore blue caps and accessories with the road gray uniforms for the first time since 1998. This combination would not appear again until the black trim, caps, and accessories were eliminated for the 2012 season.

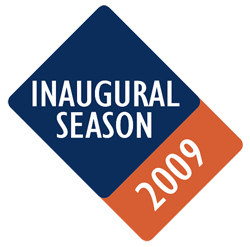
Citi Field Inaugural Season logo, worn on home uniform sleeves.

In 2009, the Mets wore a patch on the right sleeve of their home jerseys to mark the opening of their new ballpark, Citi Field. A different Inaugural Season logo for Citi Field was placed on the left side of the caps, worn at home and on the road. Neither logo patch contained the name of the ballpark, in deference to MLB rules prohibiting corporate names or logos (other than those of the uniform manufacturer) from appearing on the uniform; similar logos containing the name "Citi Field" were designed and used in publications, signage and other contexts. Also in 2009, the road ("NEW YORK") version of the black alternate jersey was discontinued, although the home ("Mets") version continued to be worn as an alternate in road games as well as at home.

In 2010, the white alternate uniform was re-designated as the primary home uniform. The pinstriped uniform was re-designated as an alternate, with the fabric base color changed from white to off-white/cream. This uniform was paired exclusively with the blue cap, which was still the designated home cap and was worn somewhat more often in 2010 and 2011 than it had been from 1998–2009, but still only at home.

On August 29, 2011, the Mets wore their blue batting-practice jerseys in the second game of a doubleheader against the Florida Marlins at Citi Field. These jerseys had the "Mets" script, numerals and lettering in black with a white outline and orange drop-shadow, black side-panels, no sleeve patches or piping, and were worn in this game with the white alternate pants, all-black alternate caps, and blue accessories.

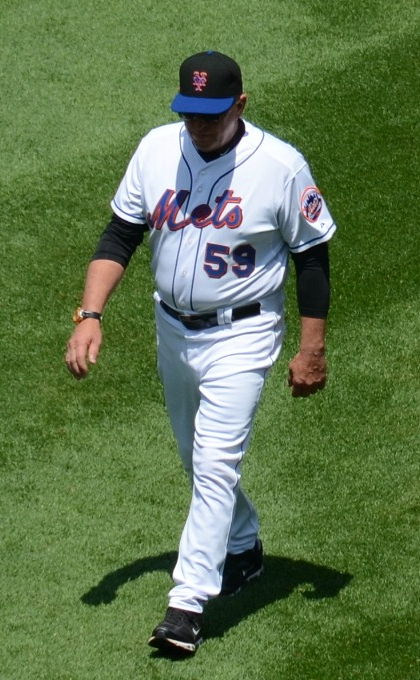
Pitching coach Dan Warthen in what was the Mets' de facto primary home uniform from 1998-2009, consisting of the plain white alternate jersey and pants with blue piping and black drop-shadows, and the two-tone alternate/road cap.

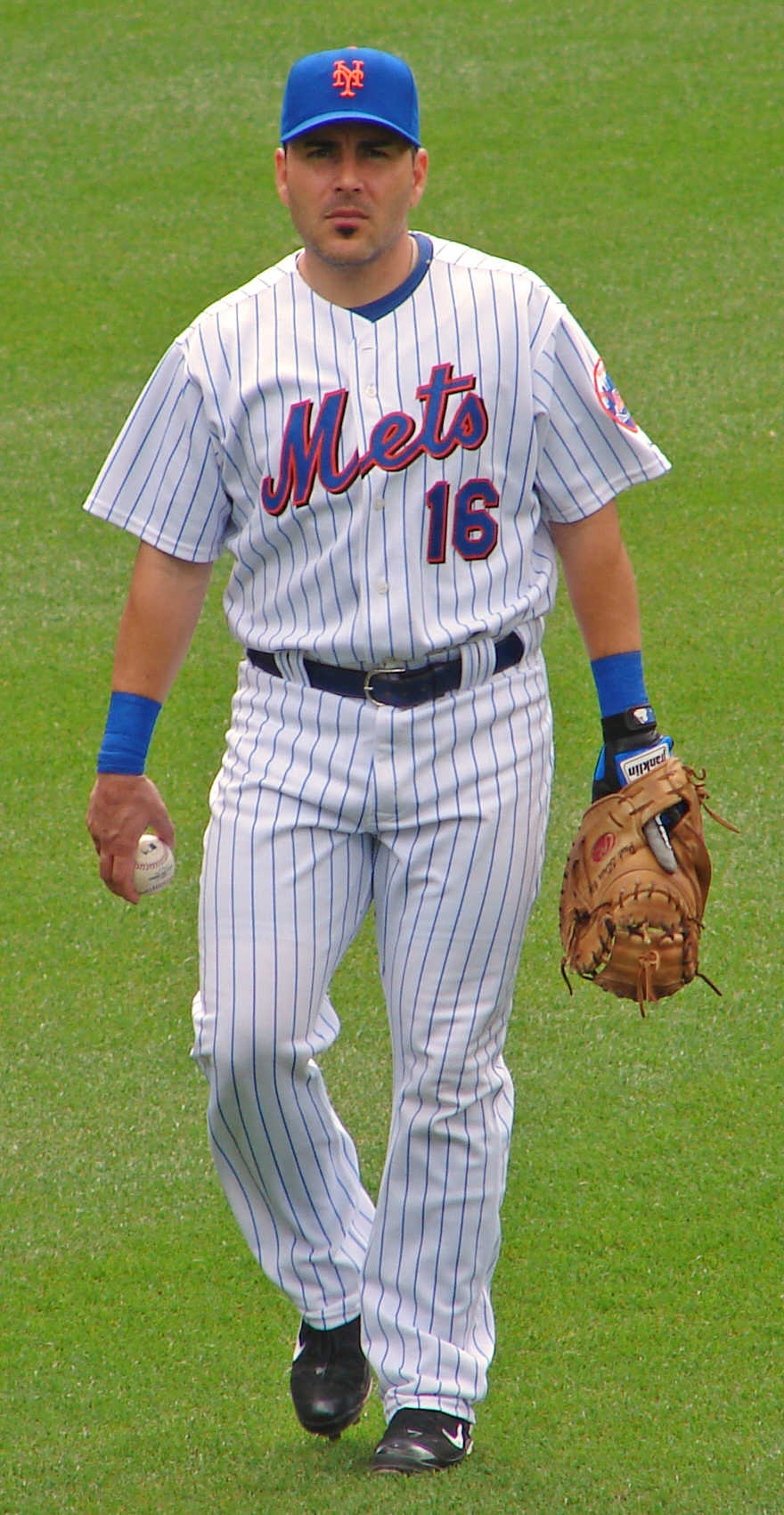
Paul Lo Duca wearing the "official" (but rarely seen) 1999-2009 primary home uniform, with pinstripes and the blue cap.

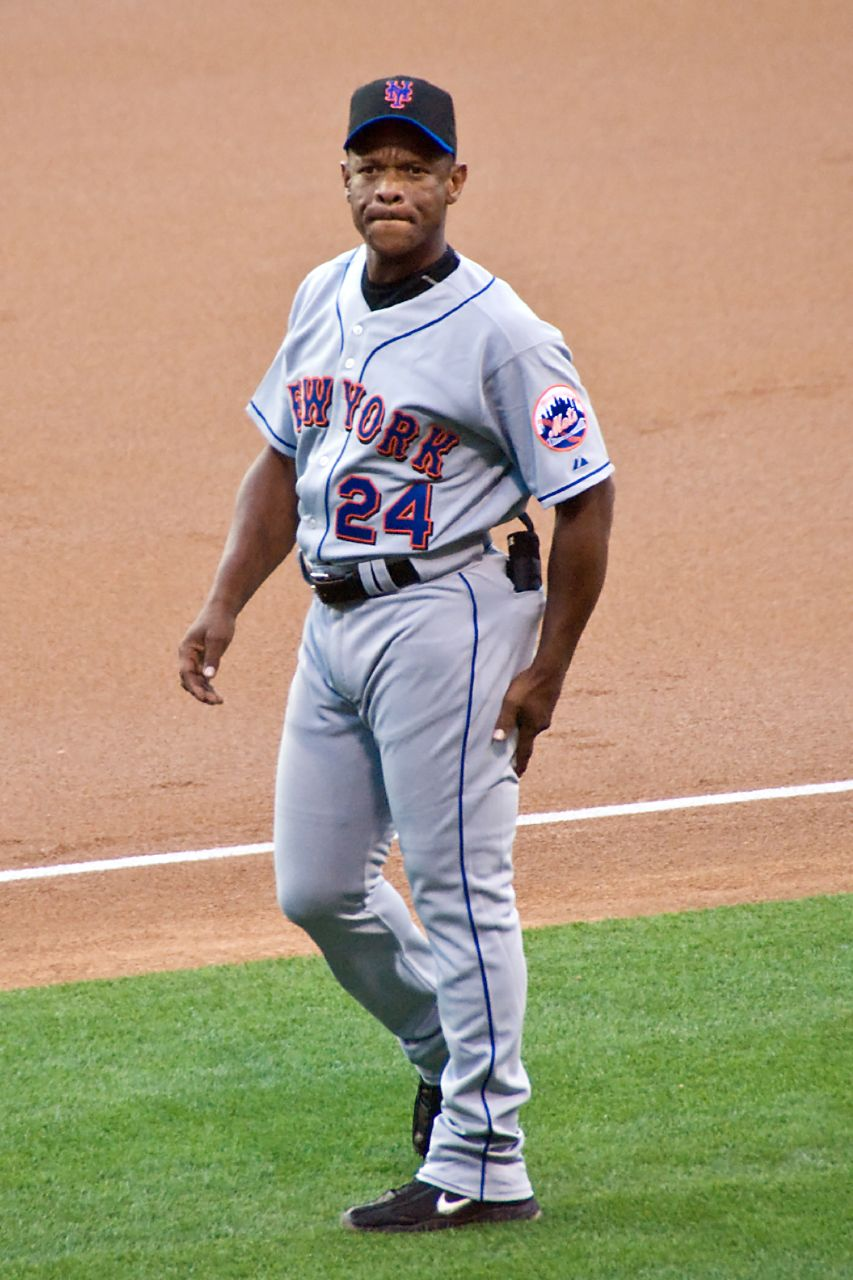
Coach Rickey Henderson in the Mets' 1998–2011 road uniform; the two-tone cap was officially designated as the road cap in 2001.

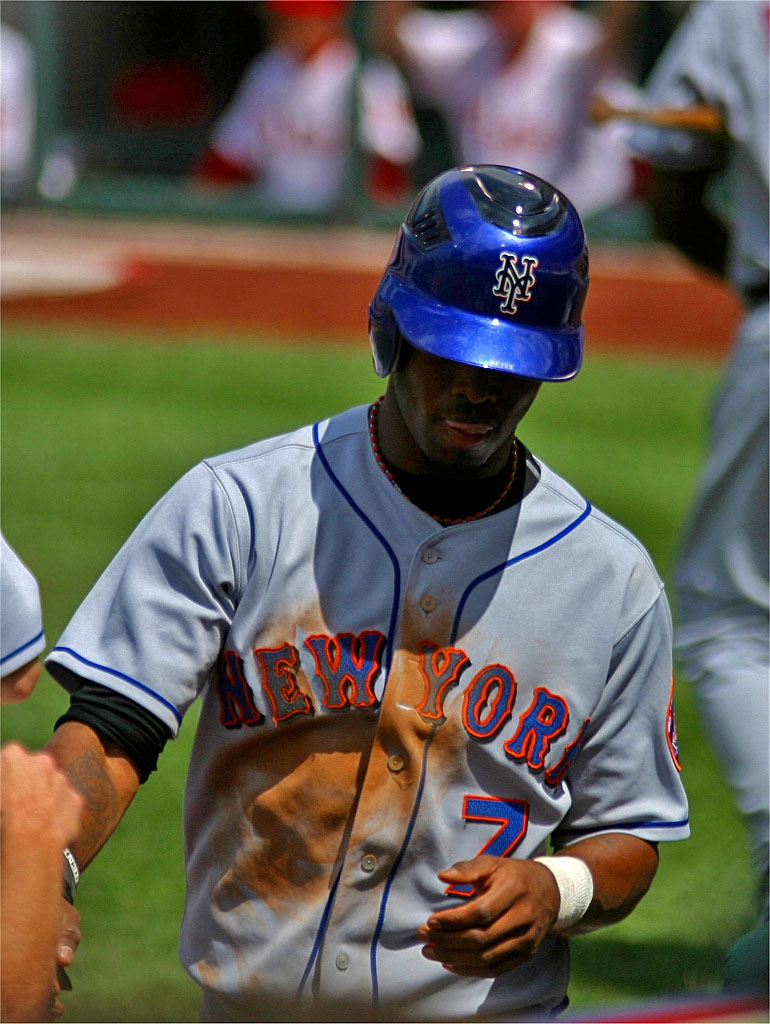
José Reyes in the 1998–2011 road uniform, with the two-tone batting helmet used from 2006–2011.

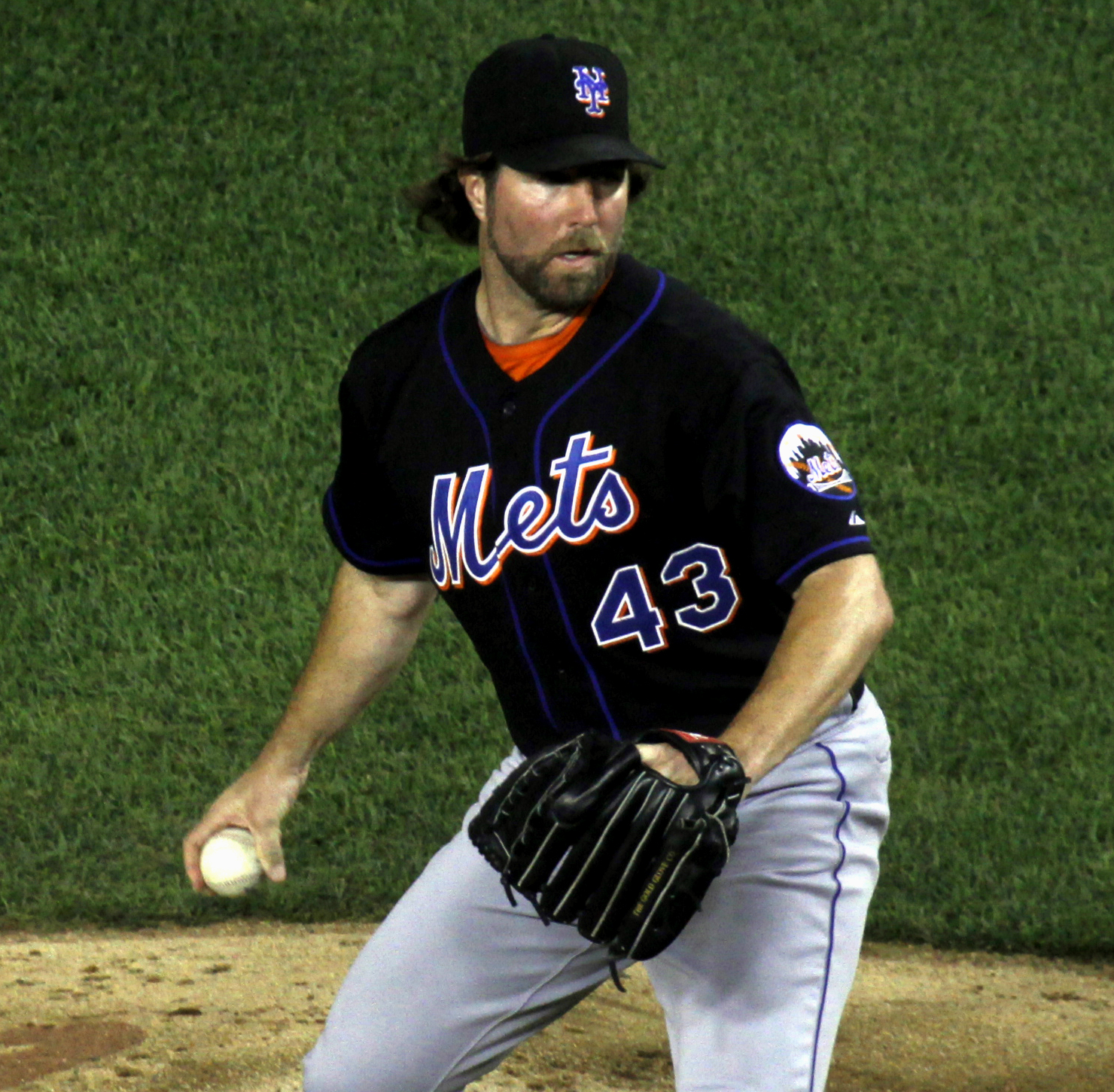
R. A. Dickey in the Mets' 1999–2012 black alternate jersey and cap, on the road in 2011. When introduced in 1998, the jersey had the Mets' standard primary-logo patch on the left sleeve and was worn with the two-tone cap, replaced in 1999 by the alternate logo and all-black cap, respectively, shown here.

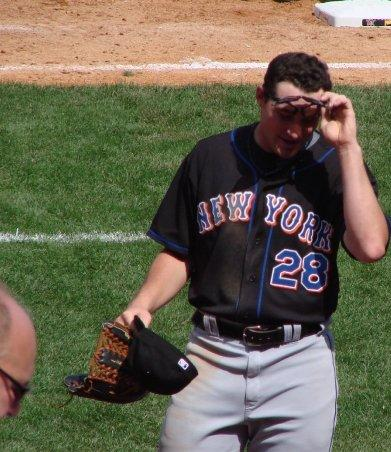
Daniel Murphy in the Mets' 1999–2008 black road alternate jersey. The "Mets" version was worn as both a home and road alternate in 1998 and from 2009–2011.

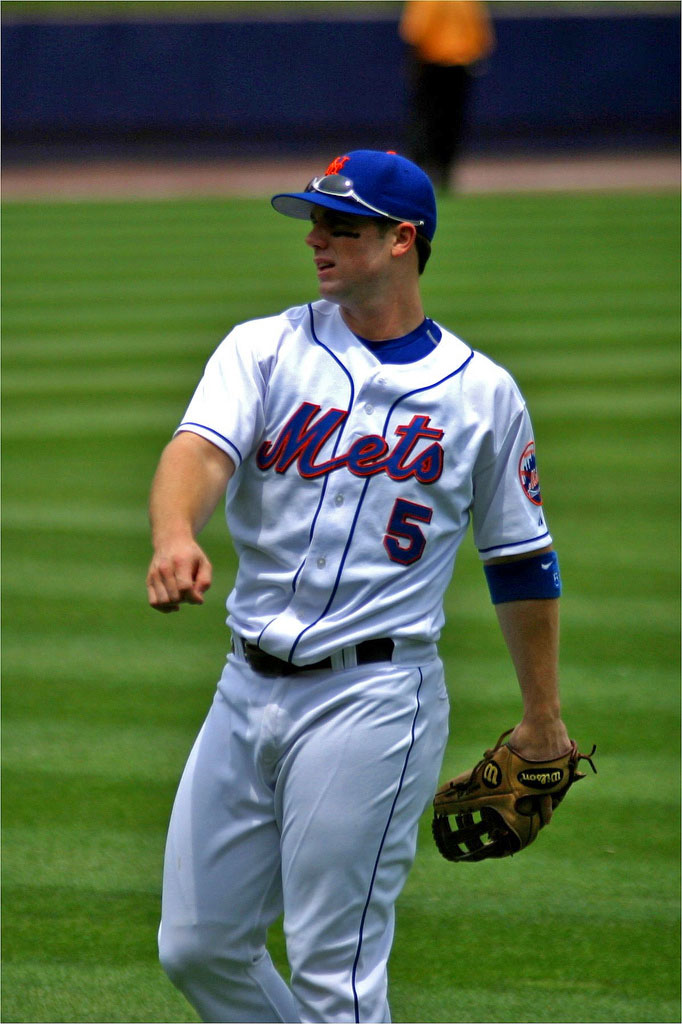
David Wright wearing the 1998-2009 white alternate uniform with the blue primary cap. This combination was the primary home uniform in 2010 and 2011.

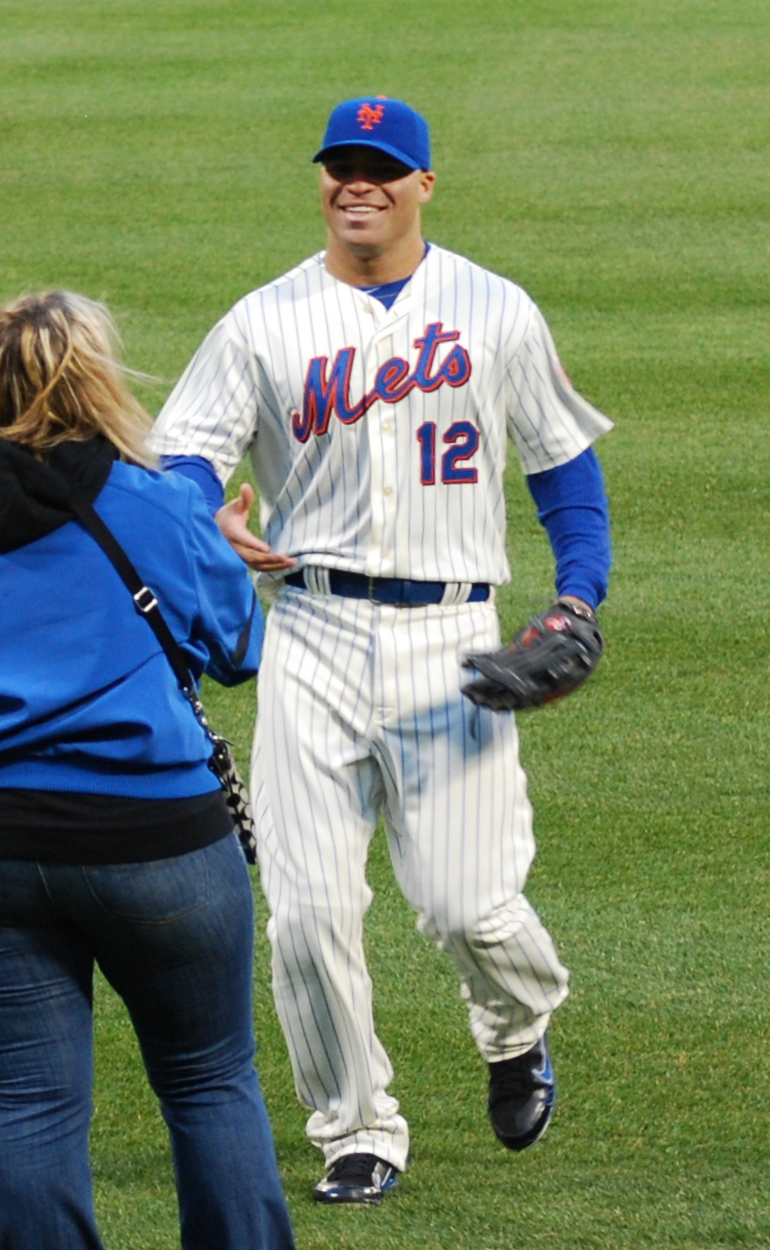
Scott Hairston wearing the 2010-2011 off-white pinstriped home alternate. The black alternate caps and accessories were not worn with this uniform.

==== 2012–2020: Back to basics, again ====
In 2012, the black drop-shadow was removed from all of the team's jersey graphics, and the two-tone cap was discontinued. The off-white/cream-colored pinstriped uniform became the primary home uniform, the white uniform became the home alternate, the blue cap with orange crest became the sole uniform cap for both home and road games, and all three uniforms were worn with blue socks, belts and undersleeves. The metallic paint treatment on the batting helmets was discontinued. The black jerseys and all-black caps were retained but worn only twice, on occasions honoring former players Edgardo Alfonzo and John Franco who wore them during significant portions of their Mets careers. A special 50th Anniversary logo patch supplanted the primary logo patch on the left sleeve of the home, alternate and road jerseys, was added to the right sleeve of the black jerseys, and was also embroidered on the back of the caps. A memorial patch for former Mets catcher and Hall of Famer Gary Carter was worn on the right sleeve of the home, alternate and road jerseys, and on the front of the black jerseys by the player's right shoulder. This patch was black, in the shape of home plate, with "KID" (Carter's nickname) above "8" (Carter's number) in white lettering.

In 2013, the Mets hosted the All-Star Game, and wore a corresponding logo patch on the left sleeve of their jerseys, supplanting the primary logo for another year. The team also added blue home and road alternate jerseys to its uniform rotation. The blue home jersey had the "Mets" script, numerals and lettering in orange outlined in white, and orange placket and sleeve piping, and was worn with the white home alternate pants. The road version had the "NEW YORK" wordmark, numerals, and lettering in grey outlined in orange. Also in 2013, the club introduced an alternate cap with a blue crown, orange bill, and "NY" logo crest in orange outlined in white, but with no corresponding alternate batting helmet. This alternate cap was worn occasionally at home, with either the blue or white alternate jerseys. The black alternate jerseys were not worn at all in 2013 despite indications that the club might retain them for special occasions as it did in 2012 and so were removed from the team's wardrobe, although they would be revived as a home alternate in 2021.

In 2014, the blue alternate jerseys were given a new left-sleeve patch depicting the Mets' mascot, "Mr. Met", in a running pose facing to the left of the viewer toward the front of the jersey. The primary-logo patch returned to the left sleeve of the home pinstriped, white alternate and road gray jerseys after being supplanted for two years. Also in 2014, the Mets wore a patch on the right sleeve of all five jerseys honoring former longtime Mets broadcaster and baseball Hall of Famer Ralph Kiner, who died on February 6. The patch was a black circle with silver border and lettering, depicting a microphone at center with the name "RALPH KINER" circumscribed above and "1922–2014" below.

In addition, the Mets introduced a military-camouflage alternate jersey for 2014, to be worn in select Monday home games. This jersey had the regular home "Mets" script and numerals with no piping, and an American flag patch in place of the primary logo on the left sleeve. It was worn with a matching camouflage cap, with the "NY" logo crest in blue outlined in orange.

In September 2014, a revised version of the Mets' primary logo began to appear on the club's social media accounts, substituting the Citigroup Center for the United Nations building on the right side of the skyline. The club subsequently announced that the primary logo was not changing and the accounts reverted to the proper logo.

In 2015, the Mets changed the fabric base color of the home pinstriped uniform from off-white/cream to white, and discontinued the white alternate uniform. As a result, the blue home alternate jerseys were worn with the pinstriped pants. The club also added an alternate road cap, with a blue crown and bill and the "NY" logo in grey outlined in orange, matching the road blue alternate jerseys; as with the home alternate cap, there was no corresponding alternate batting helmet.

In 2016, the Mets wore 1986 "throwback" uniforms in every Sunday home game, to mark the 30th anniversary of the club's last world championship. The uniform featured the same pullover jersey, blue collar, "racing stripes", and commemorative patch worn in 1986. The military-camouflage alternate jerseys and caps were discontinued.

For the 2017 season, the Mr. Met sleeve patch on the blue alternate jerseys was replaced by the standard primary-logo patch. The Mets also revised their home alternate cap, replacing the orange bill with a blue bill.

In 2018, beginning with the second game of the season on March 31, the Mets wore a memorial patch on the right sleeve of their jerseys to honor Rusty Staub, who died on March 29. The patch was a black circle with Staub's autograph (first name only) rendered in orange.

In 2020 the Mets made minor changes to their batting helmets, giving the orange "NY" logo decal a metallic sheen and removing the orange dot from the top of the crown. Beginning September 4, a memorial patch for Hall of Fame pitcher Tom Seaver, who died on August 31, was worn on the right sleeve of the Mets' jerseys; a black circle with white outline, and Seaver's number 41 in white. For the 2021 season the Mets wore a different Seaver tribute patch, this one a white circle with an orange outline, blue pinstripes, and Seaver's 41 in blue outlined in orange.

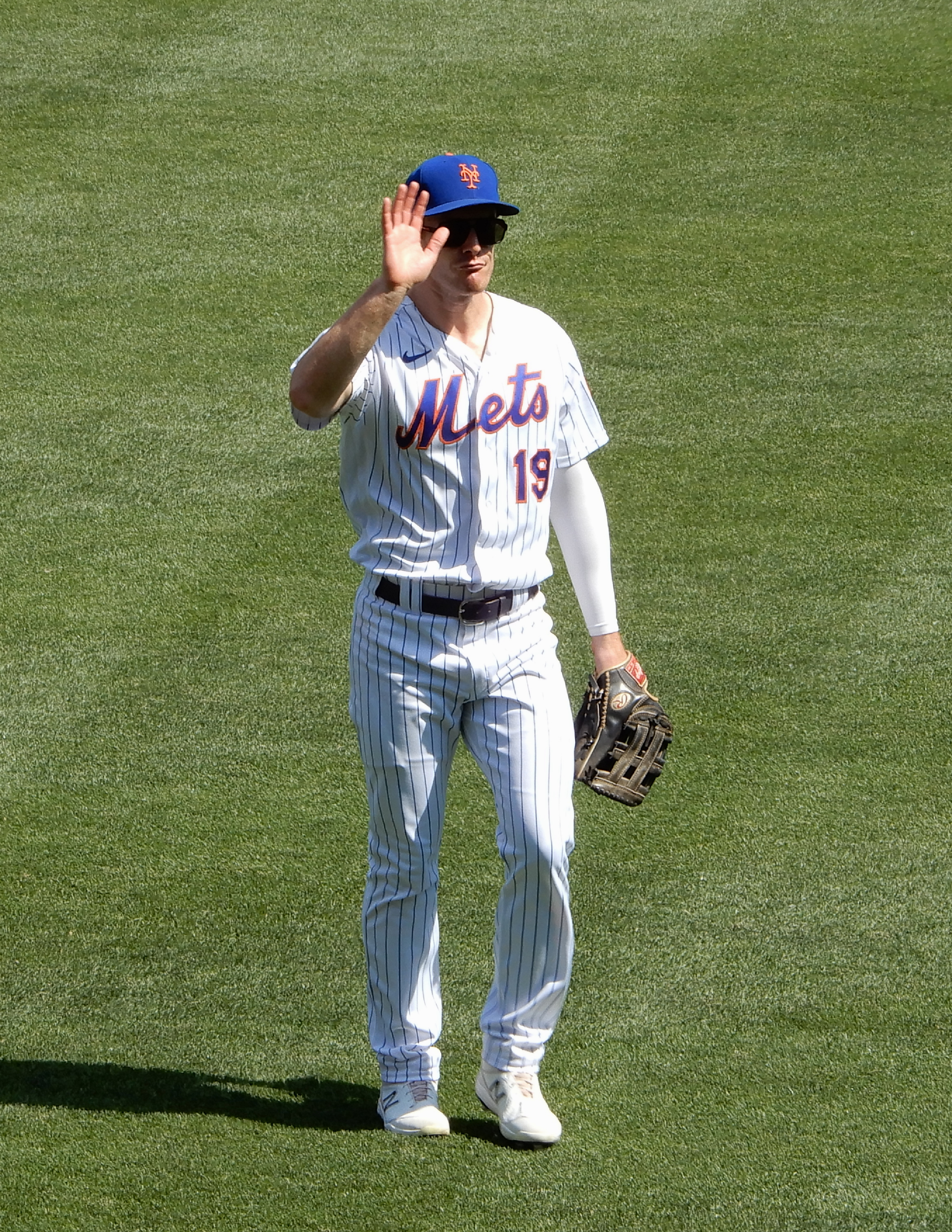
Mark Canha wearing the Mets' current white pinstriped uniform, the club's primary home uniform since 2015; shown here with the Nike mark added in 2020.

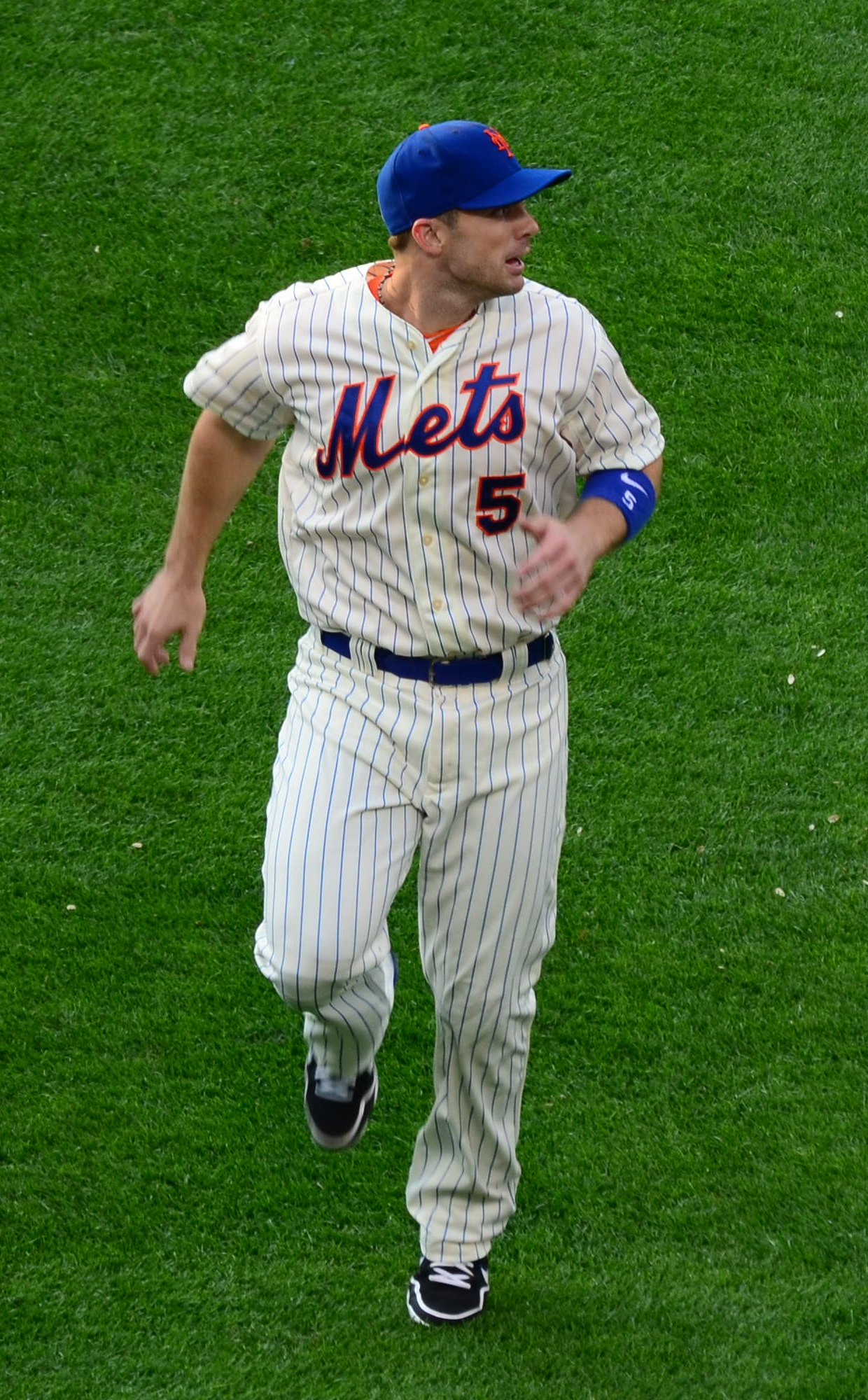
David Wright wearing the off-white pinstriped uniform, the primary home uniform from 2012–2014.

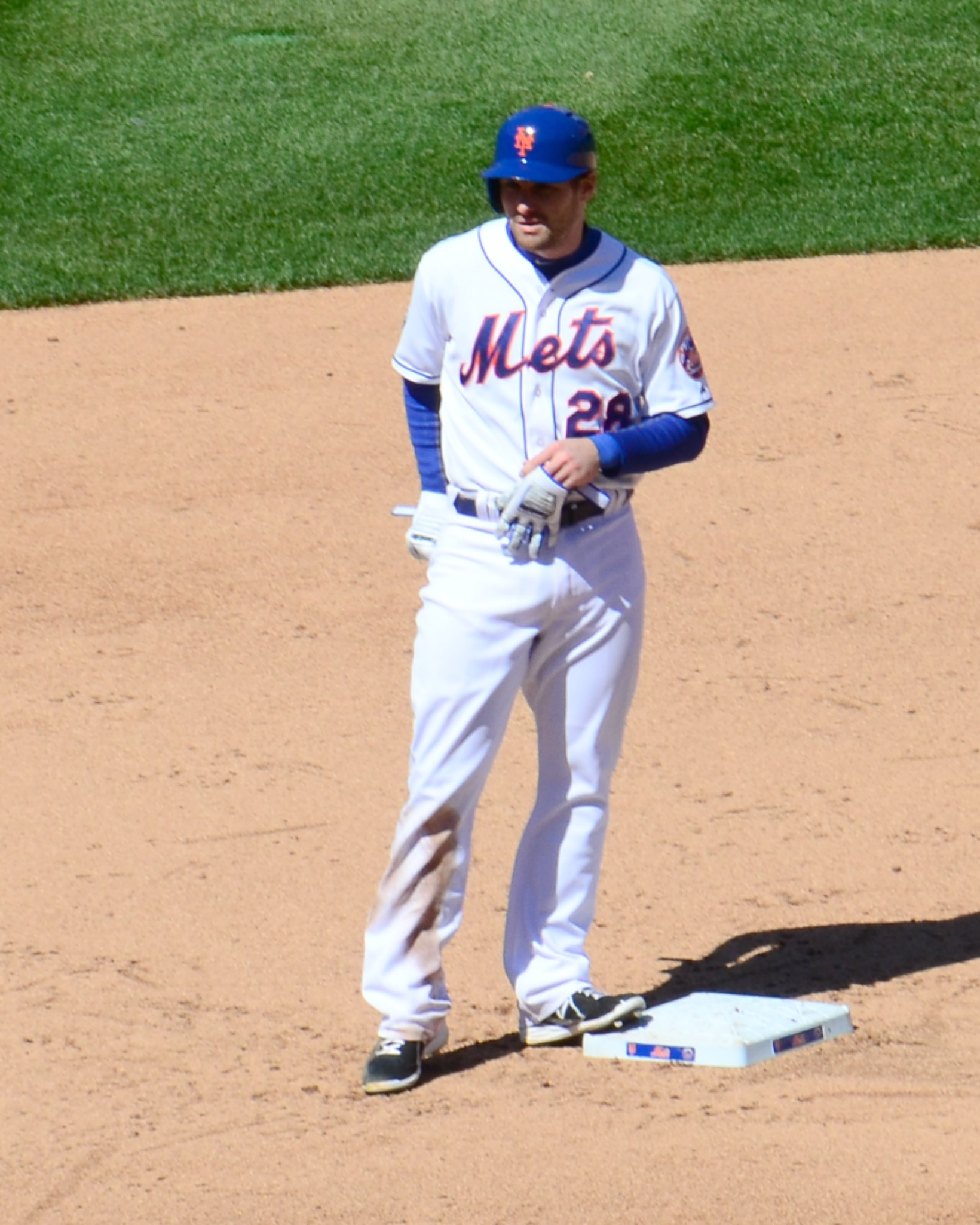
Daniel Murphy wearing the alternate white home uniform used from 2012–2014, shown here in 2014 with the primary-logo sleeve patch.

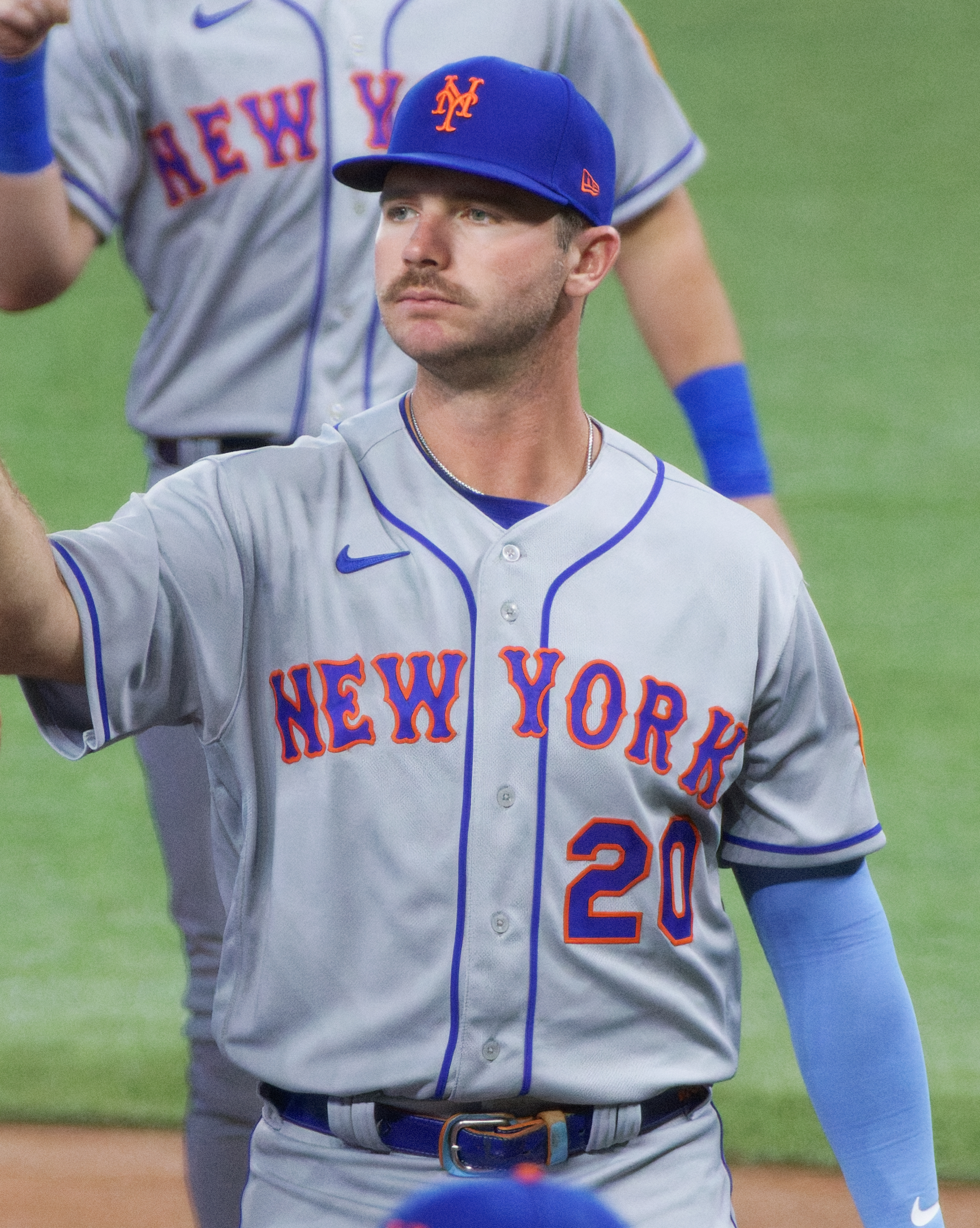
Pete Alonso wearing the Mets' 2012-2024 road uniform. This uniform was slightly revised in 2025 to delete the blue piping and add stripes on the collar, sleeve cuffs, and pants seams.

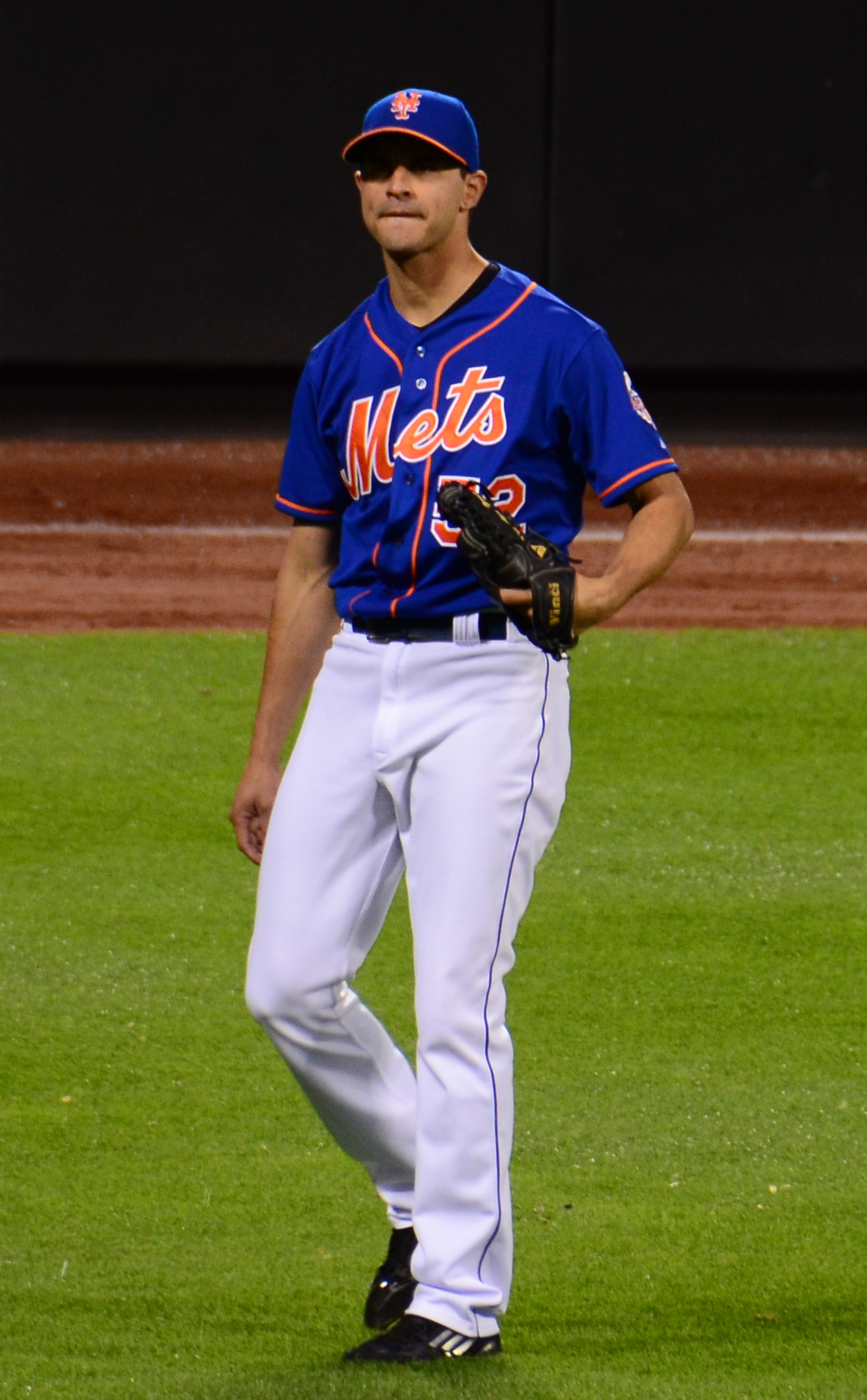
Carlos Torres wearing the Mets' alternate blue home uniform in 2013. This uniform had the 2013 All-Star Game patch and the white-trimmed "NY" crest on a blue cap with orange bill.

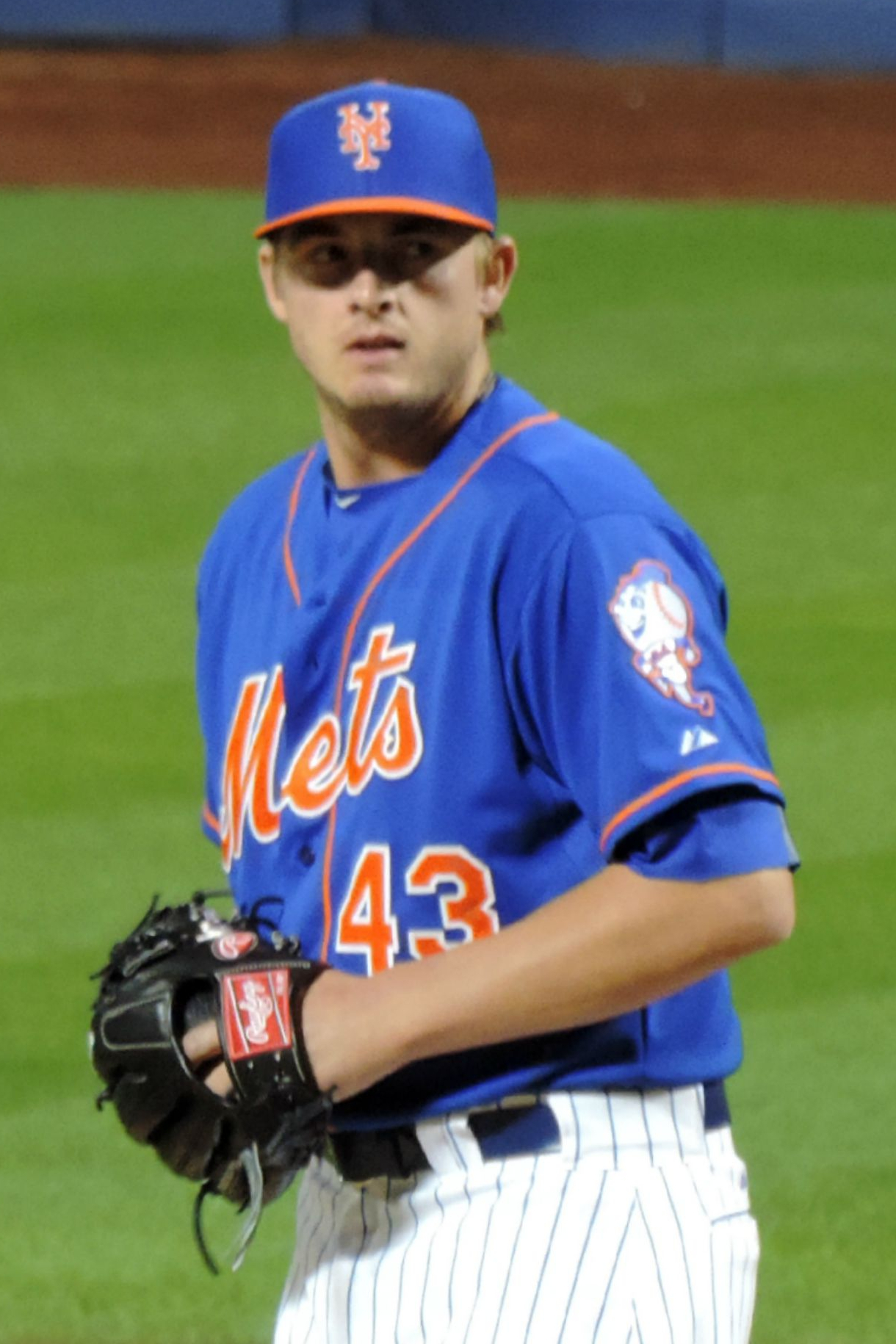
Addison Reed wearing the Mets' blue alternate home uniform in 2015, with the "Mr. Met" patch and pinstriped pants.

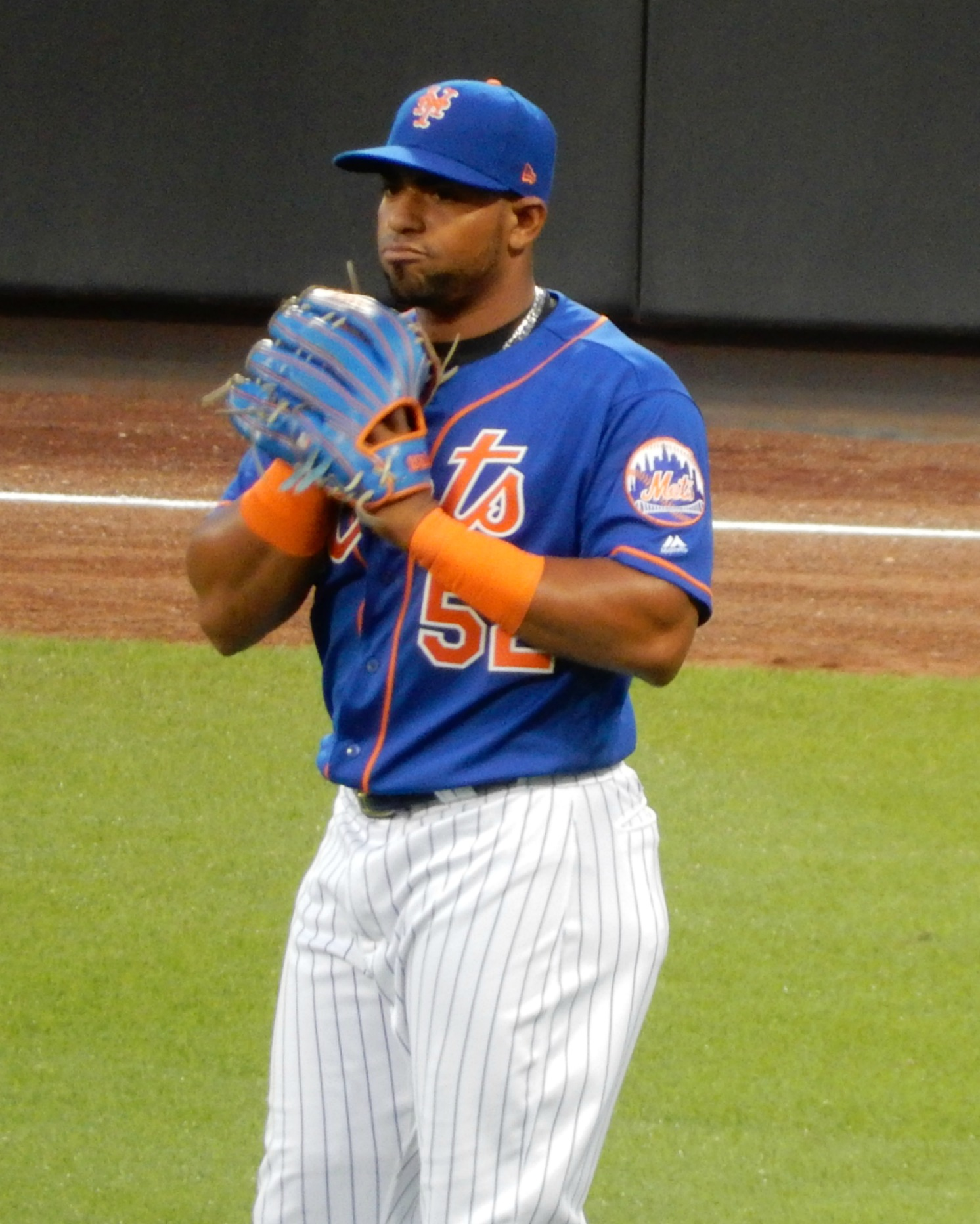
Yoenis Céspedes wearing the Mets' blue alternate home uniform in 2017, with the primary-logo patch and all-blue cap with the white-trimmed "NY" crest.

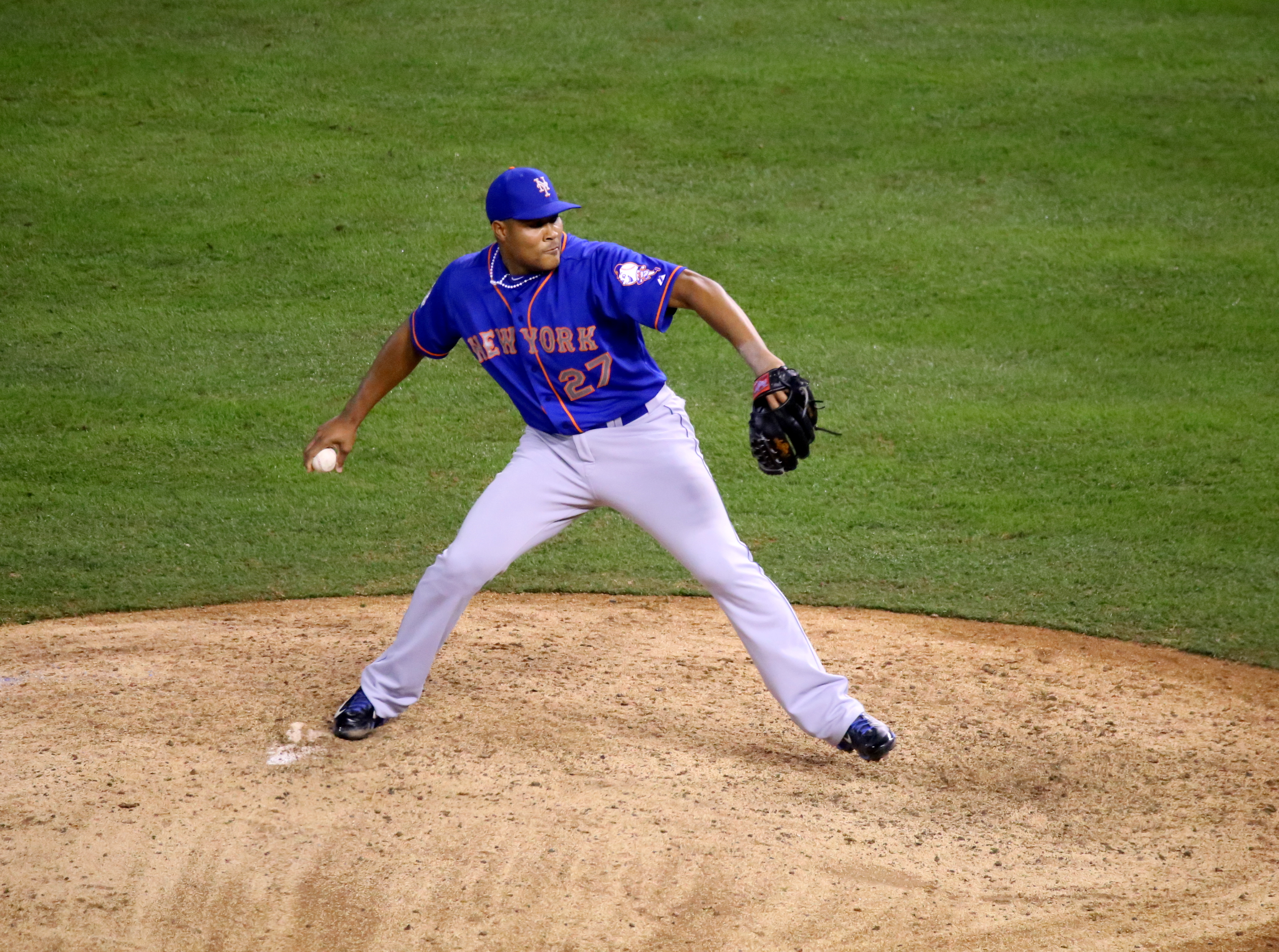
Jeurys Familia wearing the Mets' alternate road uniform in 2015, with the "Mr. Met" patch and grey "NY" with orange trim on the all-blue cap.

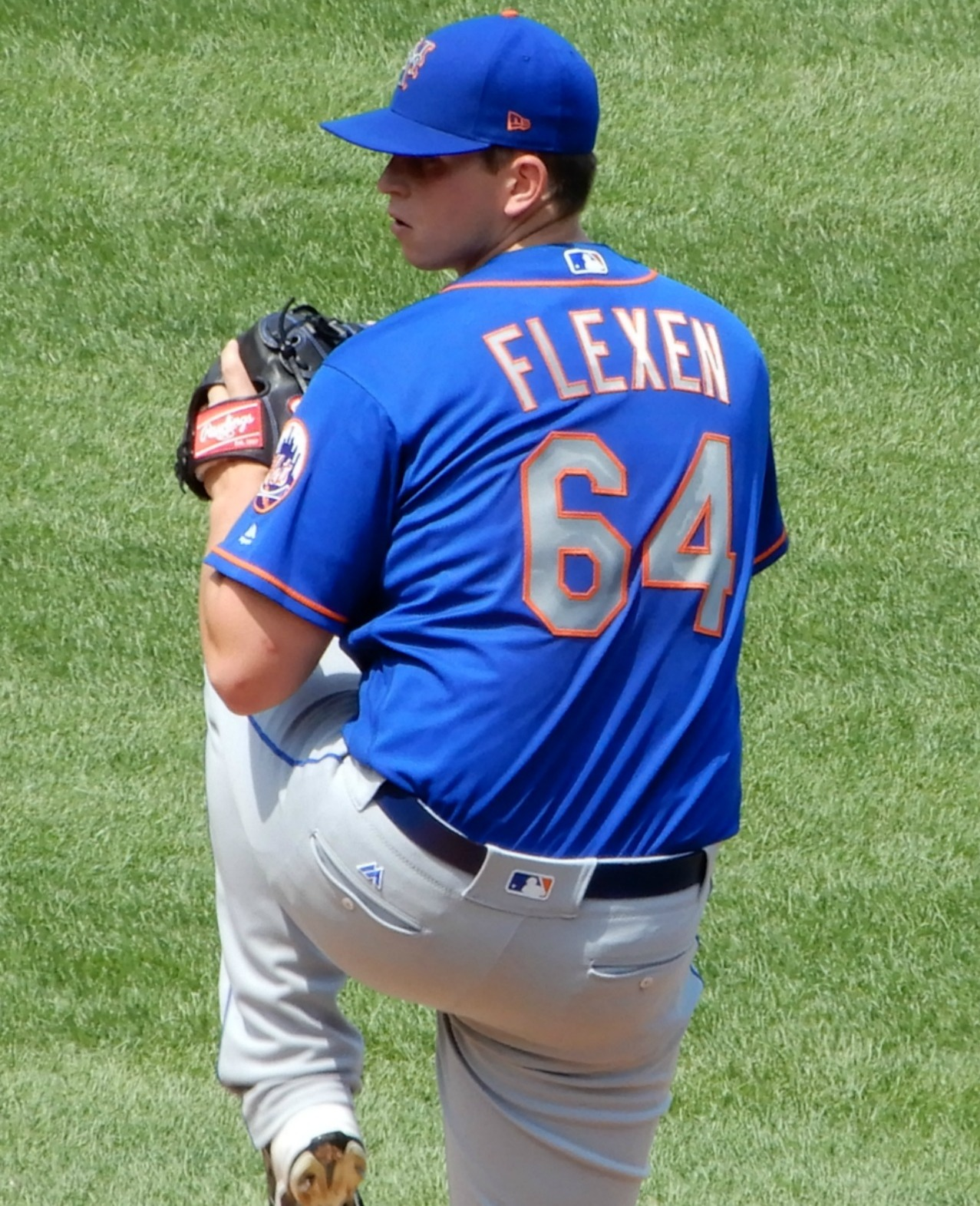
Chris Flexen wearing the 2017-2021 version of the Mets' alternate road uniform, with the primary-logo patch. This uniform was discontinued in 2022.

==== 2021–present: Back in black, sleeve ads, and "City Connect" ====
In 2021, the Mets revived the black alternate jerseys for Friday home games beginning on July 30. The jerseys featured the standard primary-logo patch on the left sleeve, matching the original black jerseys from 1998, and were worn with plain white pants with blue piping and the all-black caps and batting helmets used from 1999-2012. The Mets brought back the black jerseys, without the blue piping, as a full-season Friday home alternate for 2022, and discontinued the blue alternate road jersey and cap. Also in 2022, after one game wearing the blue home alternate jerseys with pinstriped pants (as they had done since 2015) the Mets switched to the plain white pants with blue piping for the blue home alternates.

In 2023, beginning with the team's home opener on April 7, the Mets added an advertising patch to the sleeves of their jerseys. The advertiser is NewYork-Presbyterian Hospital; the patch initially consisted of a large white square outlined in red with the advertiser's name and logo in red lettering. Almost immediately after the ad patch debuted the Mets indicated that its colors would change from red and white to "a more team-friendly look." On April 25, 2023 the team introduced a revised ad patch which reduced the large white square to a smaller blue rectangle outlined in orange and horizontally oriented around the advertiser's logo and wordmark in white lettering. Although the Mets have traditionally worn the primary-logo patch on the left sleeve (and uniformed non-players such as the manager and coaches continue to do so), its position now depends on the player's handedness, in order to maximize television exposure of the advertisement while the player is at bat. As such, left-handed batters and pitchers still have the primary-logo patch on the left sleeve, with the ad patch on the right sleeve, while right-handed batters and pitchers have the ad patch on the left sleeve with the primary-logo patch moved to the right sleeve. Switch-hitters have the patches placed according to the opposing team's starting pitcher; primary on the left, ad on the right against right-handed starters, the opposite against left-handed starters.

In 2024, Major League Baseball clubs began using a new uniform template that resulted in some minor changes to the Mets' uniforms. The MLB batterman logo on the back of the collar was moved downward (below the piping on the blue home alternate and road gray jerseys) resulting in the players' names being rendered in smaller letters, while the front numeral typeface was altered to be slightly thinner and taller. Also in 2024, the Mets made additional changes to their black home alternate jerseys and caps, changing the three-color graphics to two-color, viz., blue with an orange outline and no drop-shadow. On March 25, 2024 the Mets announced that they would wear a memorial patch for former player, coach and manager Bud Harrelson, who died on January 11, on their uniform sleeves above the primary logo. The diamond-shaped patch was black with a white outline, containing the numeral "3" (Harrelson's number) outlined in white with the name "BUDDY" in solid block letters inscribed vertically through the open side of the "3" from bottom to top. The Harrelson patch was later combined with a number "15" patch with the same design in memory of former player Jerry Grote, who died on April 7, with "GROTE" to the left of the numeral 1. The Harrelson and Grote patches were displayed side-by-side, left-to-right, on a solid white, grey, or black (depending on the jersey) rectangular field with rounded corners, above the primary logo patch on whichever sleeve it appears. In addition, the Mets memorialized Hall of Fame outfielder Willie Mays, who died on June 18, played for the Mets in 1972 and 1973 and had his number retired by the team in 2023, with a black circular "24" patch appearing above the advertising patch on the opposite sleeve. Both the Mays and Harrelson/Grote patches were worn on the uniforms beginning on June 29.

These symbols of the New York City Subway 7 train inspired some of the details of the Mets' "City Connect" uniforms, including the purple color and the circle and diamond shapes denoting local and express trains, respectively.

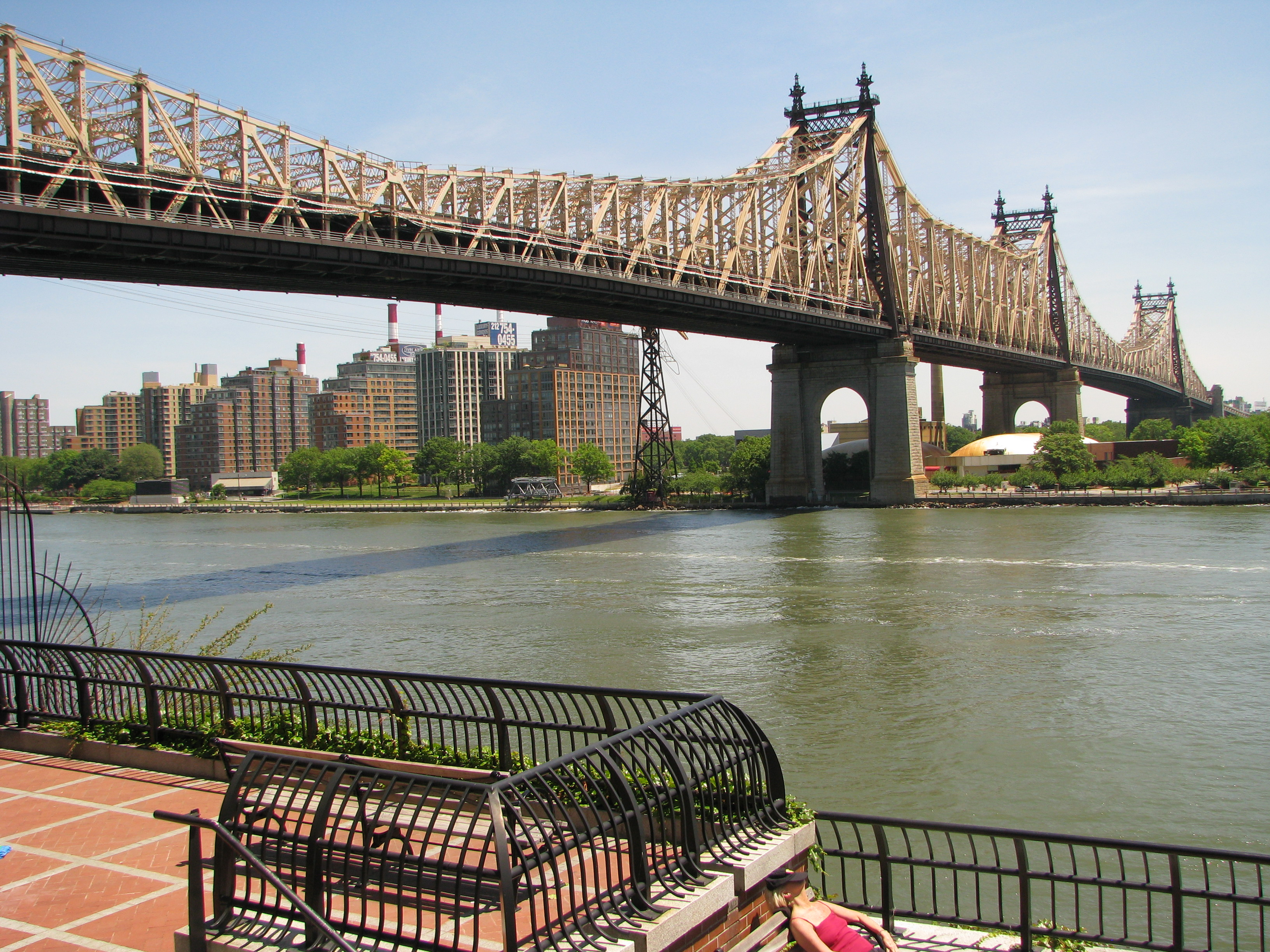
The Queensboro Bridge.

On April 19, 2024, the Mets introduced their "City Connect" uniforms, as part of an MLB-wide program designed to reflect the cultural aspects of each team's home city and feature different color schemes, typefaces, and graphic elements compared with each team's main home, road, and alternate uniforms. The Mets' "City Connect" uniform consists of a concrete-gray jersey, white pants, and black caps; the design motif reflects the "concrete jungle" of New York City and the subways and bridges that connect its five boroughs, Queens in particular. The jerseys have wide-spaced black pinstripes consisting of tiny circle and diamond shapes, reflecting the symbols of the MTA's local and express Subway lines; radially arched across the chest are the letters "N Y C" in large black capitals outlined in white, in the same Tiffany typeface as the club's primary road wordmark, and the player's name and number in the same colors and typeface are on the back. On one sleeve is a circular patch in black with a purple outline and the Mets' "NY" cap insignia in purple, the color representing the 7 train which runs past Citi Field; the patch is designed to resemble subway tokens used in the city from 1953-2003, particularly those minted prior to 1986 with an "NYC" emblem in the center. The advertising patch, recolored in black with white outline and lettering, appears on the opposite sleeve. The jerseys also have purple trim around the sleeve cuffs and a purple maker's mark on the upper right chest. The black caps have a purple button on top, the "NY" crest in black outlined in white, and an embroidered image of the Queensboro Bridge in dark gray across the base of the front panel; the bridge's trusses are similarly represented in the sleeve-cuff and pants-seam stripes.

For 2025 the Mets redesigned their road gray uniforms to remove the blue piping used since 1995 (and from 1962–77) and add thin blue-orange-blue triple stripes on the collar, sleeve cuffs, and pants seams, similar to those used from 1978–81 and in 1993. The team also introduced a new road alternate jersey, a blue pullover with orange stripes around the collar and sleeve cuffs, with the lettering and numerals in blue outlined in orange. The front of the jersey revived the cursive "New York" script used by the club on its 1987 road uniforms, with the player's number below "York" on the left side. With the addition of this new road alternate, the blue home alternates were discontinued in order to comply with MLB's "4 + 1" rule (four uniforms plus "City Connect"). The Mets wore these jerseys in a home game against the Atlanta Braves on June 26, the first time in club history that a road jersey was worn at home and only the second time the Mets wore "New York" on the front of their jerseys in a home game, after the special 9/11 anniversary jerseys worn in 2021.

Some of the changes made to the uniforms in 2024 by the new template were reverted in 2025, including the numeral and name-lettering specifications. Also in 2025, the Mets added a memorial patch for former player Ed Kranepool, who died on September 8, 2024. The patch was a black square with rounded corners outlined in white, with Kranepool's number 7 in white in the center, and appeared on the sleeve above the primary logo patch. In addition, the Mets began wearing purple undersleeves with their "City Connect" uniforms.

For the 2026 season the Mets added a memorial patch for former manager Davey Johnson, who died on September 5, 2025. The patch consisted of a black rectangular strip with a white border and the name "DAVEY" in white block lettering, and was placed above the primary logo patch on the jersey sleeve. The "NEW YORK" lettering on the road gray jerseys, reduced in size for 2024, reverted to its previous specification. Also in 2026, the Mets wore their blue road alternate jerseys at home on several occasions, with the white pinstriped pants.

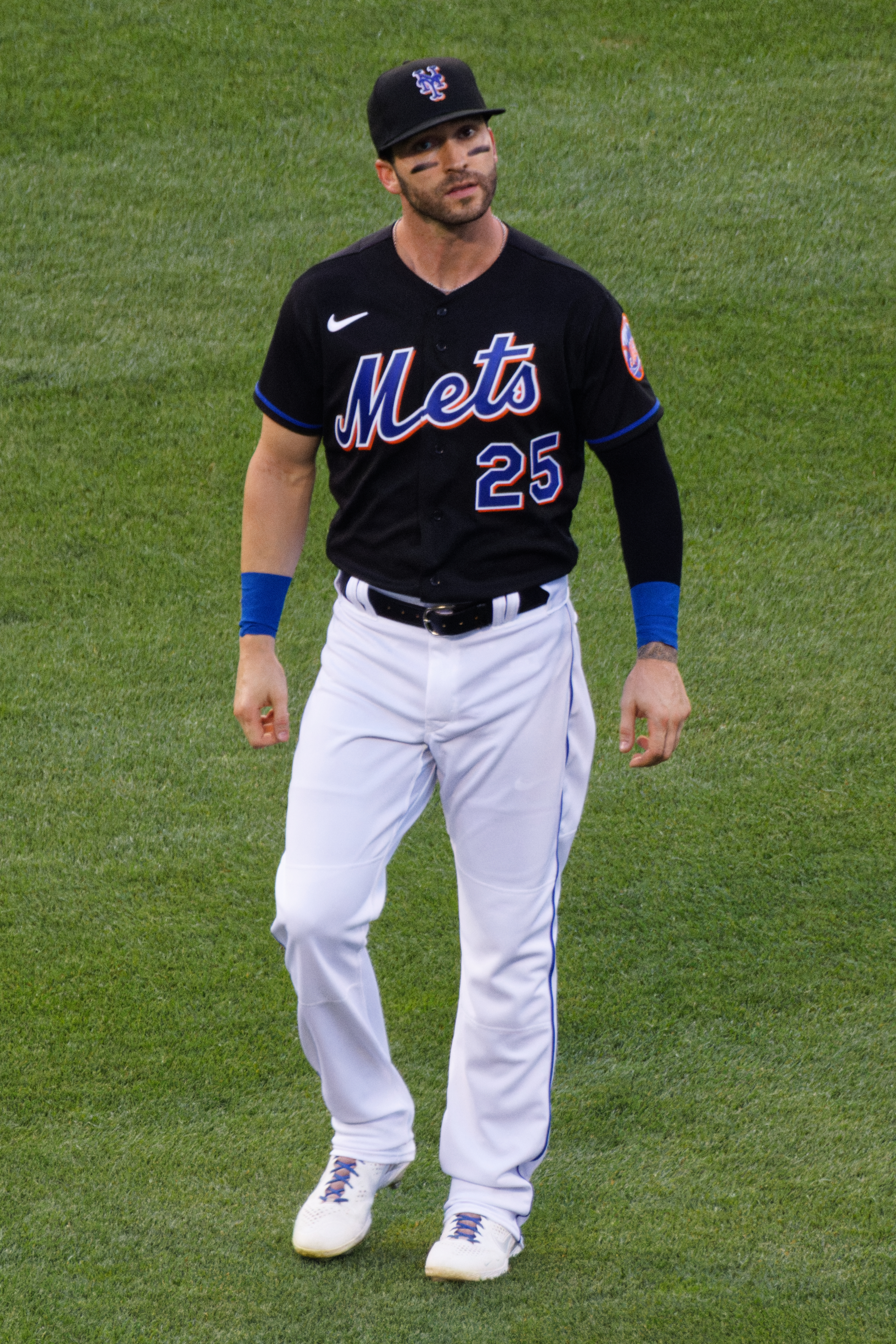
Tyler Naquin wearing the Mets' 2022-2023 black alternate home uniform, which deleted the blue placket and sleeve piping used in 2021 and from 1998-2012.

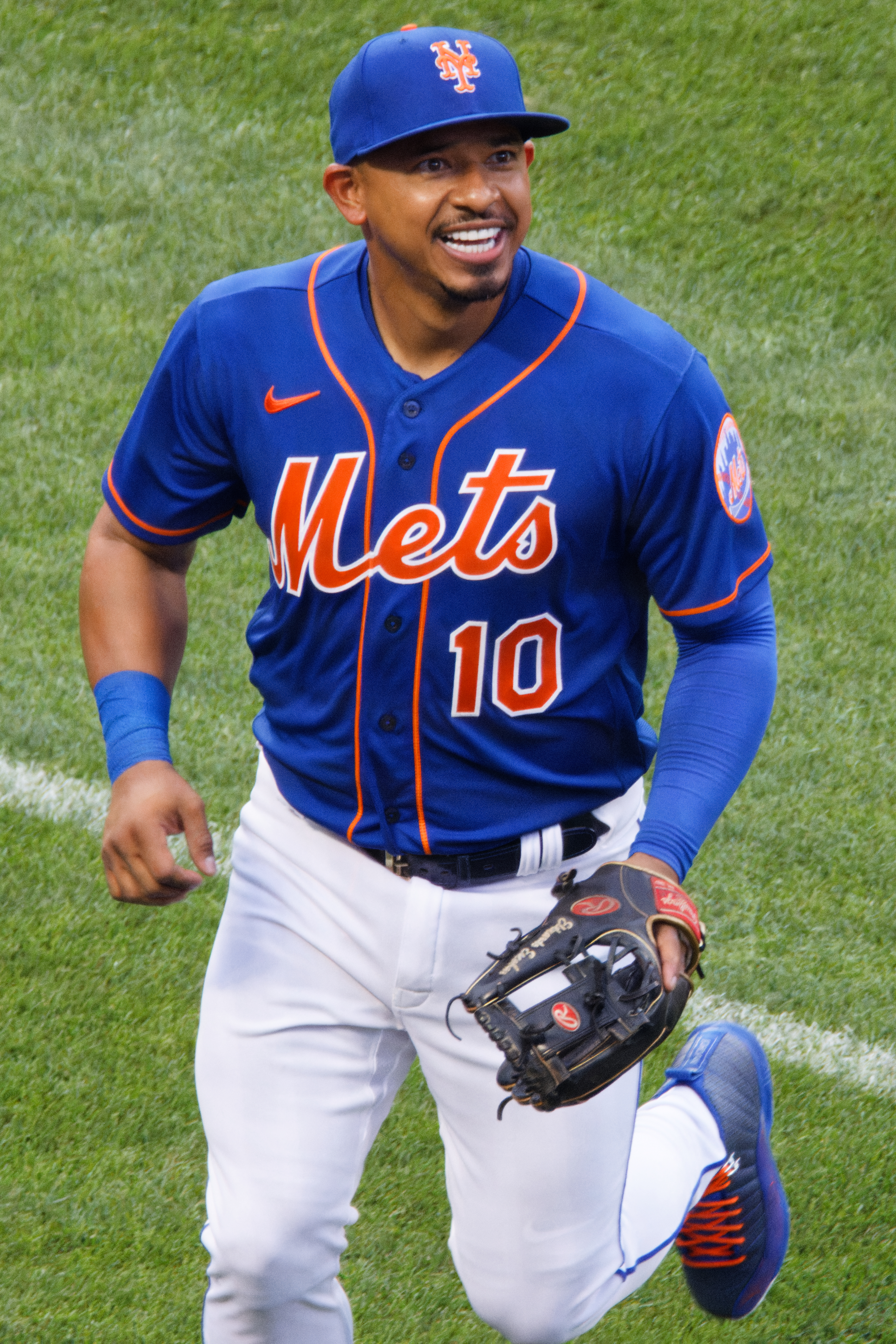
Eduardo Escobar wearing the Mets' blue alternate home uniform with plain white pants in 2022. This uniform was discontinued in 2025.

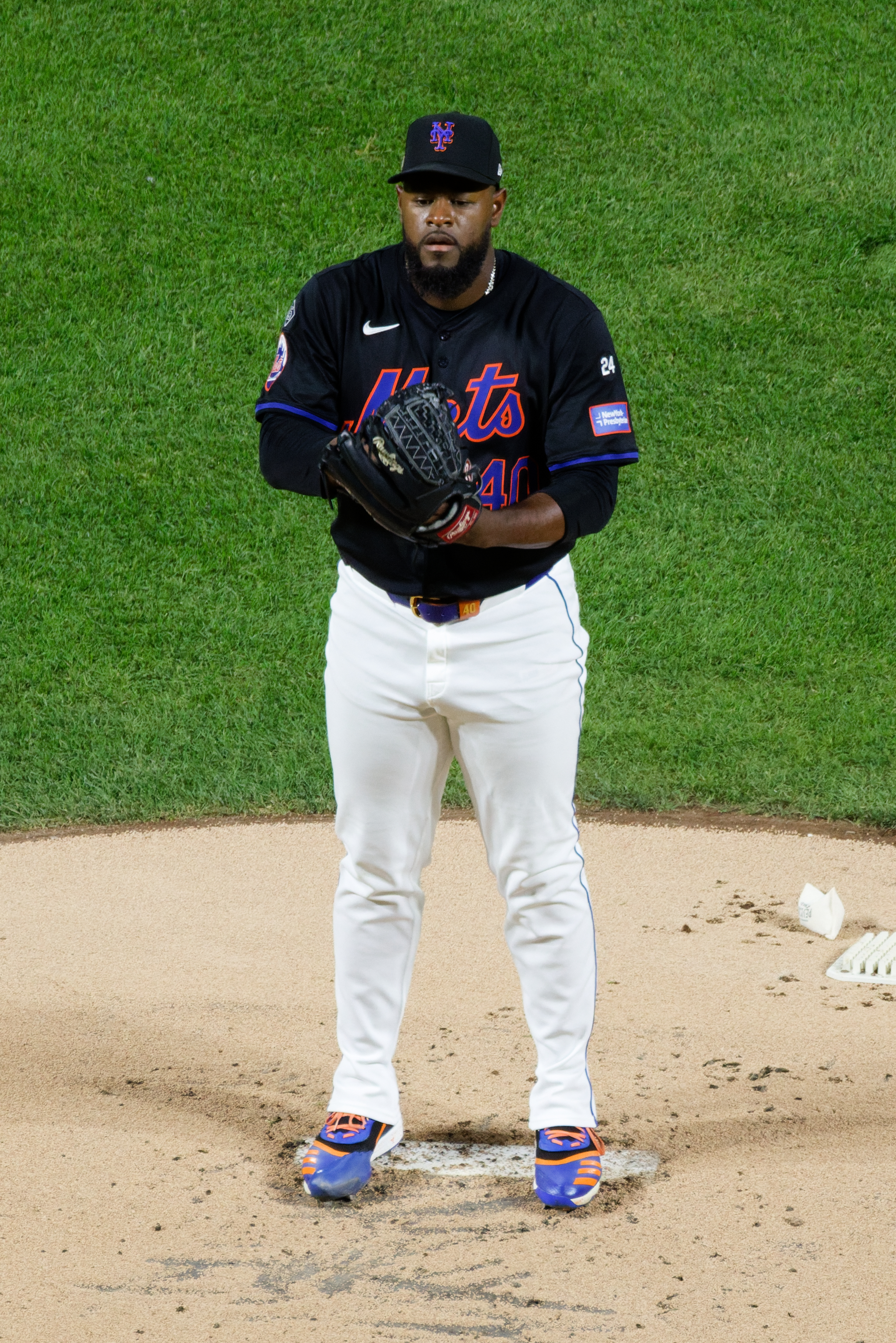
Luis Severino wearing the Mets' current black alternate home uniform in 2024, with two-color graphics and a Willie Mays memorial patch; also visible is the advertising patch first worn in 2023.

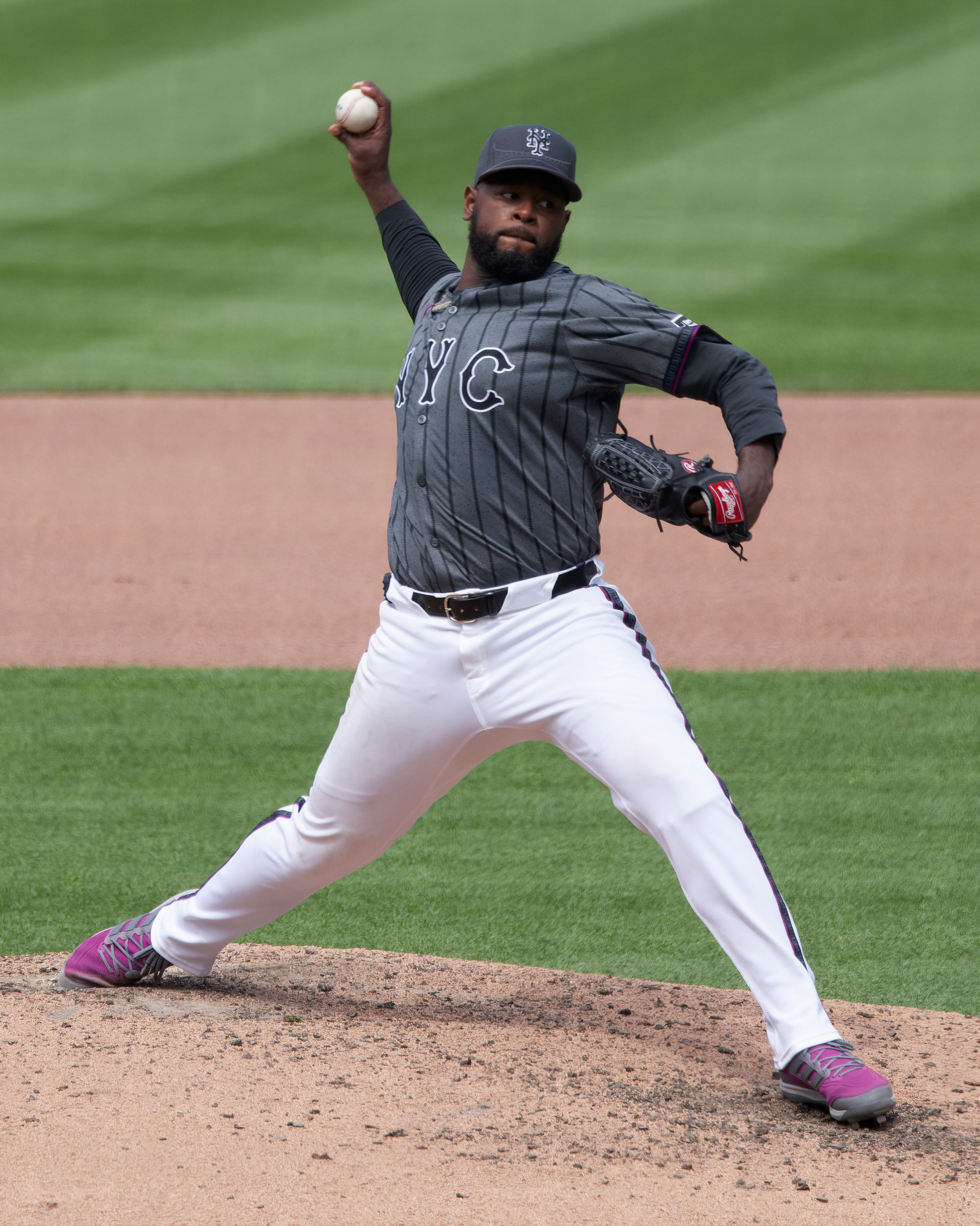
Severino wearing the Mets' City Connect uniform in 2024. These have been worn with purple undersleeves since 2025.

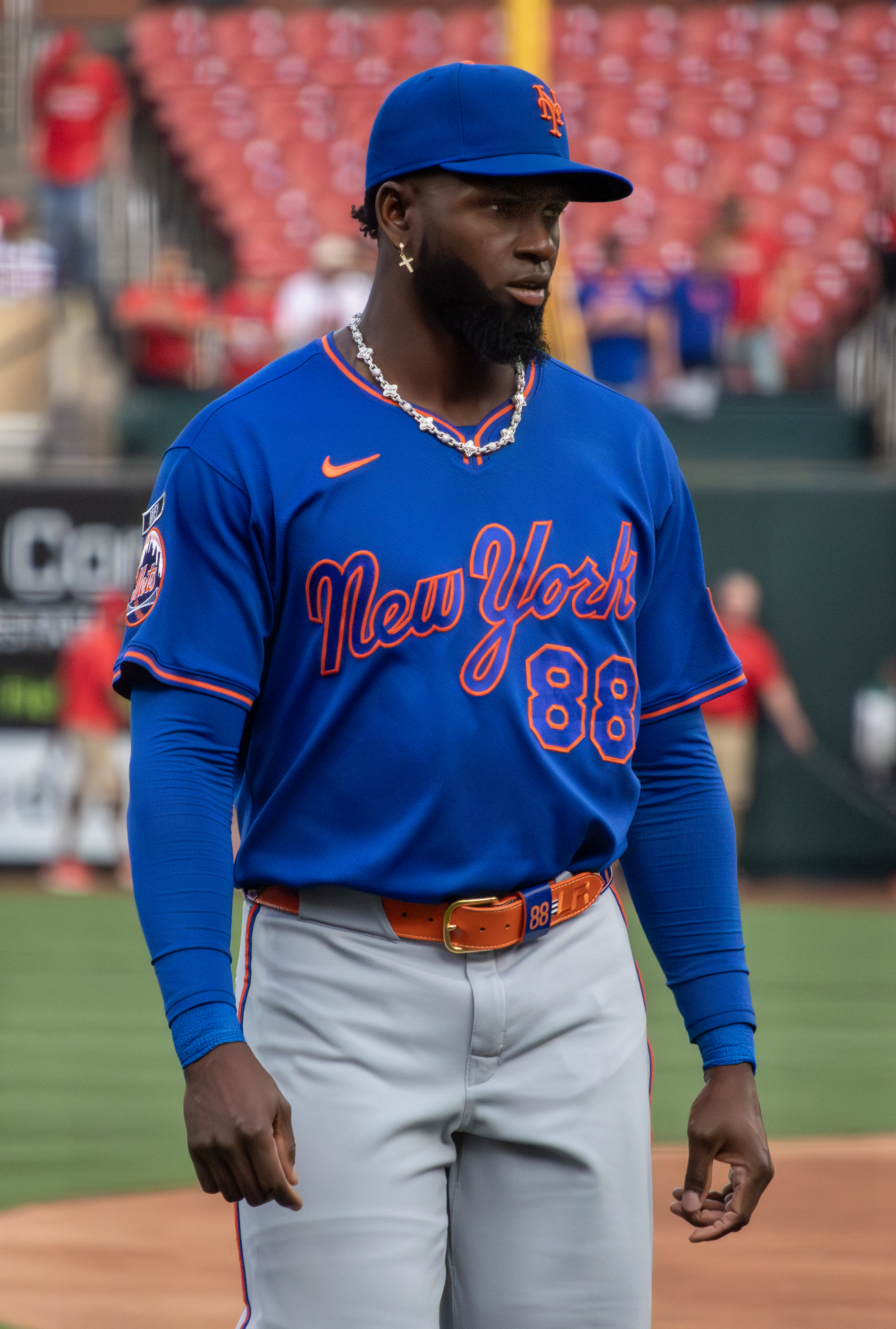
Luis Robert Jr. wearing the Mets' current blue alternate road uniform. The Mets also used this jersey as a home alternate in 2026.

=== "Throwbacks" and special uniforms ===
The Mets wore their first "throwback" (or "Turn Back the Clock") uniform, a 1962 replica, for a game against the Cincinnati Reds at Shea Stadium on August 30, 1992. The jerseys had the primary-logo patch on the left sleeve even though it was not actually used on the home jersey in the Mets' inaugural season.

In 1999, the Mets wore gray flannel 1969 replica uniforms for a road game against the Tampa Bay Devil Rays on July 17. Ten days later, most (albeit not all) MLB teams including the Mets participated in a "Turn Ahead the Clock" promotion, with futuristic uniform designs. The Mets, playing at home against the Pittsburgh Pirates, were branded as the "Mercury Mets" in reference to the planet Mercury, wearing black caps with the planetary symbol in silver as the team's logo. The jerseys were black with silver-trimmed armscyes, and had the word "Mercury" in silver appearing horizontally across the top of the chest with "METS" in vertically-stacked capitals on the player's left side. Below the word "Mercury" on the player's right side was an image of the symbol hovering above and casting its shadow upon a generic gray cratered planetoid. On the back of the jersey, the player's name and number were rendered in silver, with the player's name to the right of the number written vertically from top to bottom. (Pitcher Jason Isringhausen's name was too long to fit this design template, so his jersey read "IZZY" instead, the only time in Mets history a player's nickname appeared in place of his surname on the back of a jersey until MLB's first Players Weekend promotion, discussed below, in 2017.)

A 1969 "throwback" home uniform was worn on April 25, 2000, for a home game against the Cincinnati Reds.

On July 15, 2001, for a home game against the Toronto Blue Jays, the Mets wore replica uniforms of the 1947 New York Cubans of the Negro leagues. These uniforms were white with red piping on the placket, shoulders, sleeve cuffs and pants. Across the chest was "NEW YORK" in red lettering, angled upward, above a black silhouetted baseball bat, with "CUBANS" inscribed horizontally underneath with the letter "C" encircling the end of the bat. The caps were black with a red bill and the Mets' "NY" crest in red. The Mets would dress as the Cubans again for Negro league tribute games in subsequent seasons. On June 13, 2004 at Kansas City, July 9, 2005 at Pittsburgh, and August 11, 2006 at Washington, they appeared as the 1944 Cubans in gray uniforms with black piping on the placket, sleeve cuffs and pants, "NEW YORK" in red in radially-arched sans-serif capitals across the chest, and "CUBANS" in vertically-stacked capitals on the left sleeve. The caps were black with a red bill and the "NY" crest in red outlined in white. These were worn again, without the white outline on the cap logo, on May 29, 2010 at Pittsburgh. Later that season, on August 21 at Milwaukee, the Mets wore a Cubans uniform that was gray with red piping, red cap, and lettering resembling the 1947 version worn in 2001, as described above.

In 2002, the Mets wore 1986 replica uniforms for home games against the Florida Marlins on July 15 and 16. The uniforms featured pullover jerseys with "racing stripes" similar to the 1983–1990 style but without the 25th-Anniversary sleeve patch worn in 1986. On August 19 and 20, 2006, the Mets again wore 1986 replicas, this time with the 25th-Anniversary sleeve patch, at Shea Stadium against the Colorado Rockies.

From 2007–2014, the Mets celebrated "Hispanic Heritage Night" once each season with a special jersey, featuring the phrase "Los Mets" in place of the traditional "Mets" wordmark. From 2007–09, the "Los" was simply added to the home white alternate jersey in miniature cursive script, blue with orange outline and black drop-shadow, just above and to the left (from the viewer's perspective) of the "M" in "Mets"; in 2010 they did the same with the home pinstriped jerseys. In 2011, the team created an alternate jersey that was blue with orange placket piping, orange numerals and lettering outlined in white, a "Los Mets" wordmark in cursive script across the chest, angled upward, with "Los" on the player's right placket and "Mets" on the left above the numeral. In 2012 the blue jersey was used again, this time with white numerals and lettering outlined in orange. The 2013 "Los Mets" jersey was orange, with blue lettering outlined in white and blue piping, worn with the home alternate cap and the All-Star Game patch on the left sleeve. The orange "Los Mets" jersey returned in 2014, this time with the standard cap and the "Mr. Met" sleeve patch.

In 2009, for three games in mid-August against the San Francisco Giants at Citi Field, the Mets wore a "fauxback" (i.e., resembling the past or a particular era in style but not matching an actual previous uniform) designed to honor the old New York Giants. The uniform was off-white/cream-colored and displayed the letters "N Y" in large thick royal-blue capitals, in Tiffany typeface, on the front of the jersey with one letter on each side of the placket, with plain blue serif block numerals on the back, and thin blue-orange-blue striping around the collar and sleeve cuffs. On the right sleeve was a patch depicting the team's mascot, "Mr. Met", in a running pose facing to the right of the viewer toward the front of the uniform. The jerseys were worn with the Mets' standard blue caps, helmets, and white home alternate pants, blue socks and undersleeves, and black belts.

The Mets wore replicas of their 1989 road uniforms for a game at San Diego on August 3, 2012, adding the 2012 Gary Carter memorial patch to the right sleeve of the "throwback" jersey.

On April 16, 2013, the Mets wore replicas of their 1993 home uniforms in the second game of a doubleheader against the Colorado Rockies at Coors Field. Although the Mets were the visitors, the Rockies were commemorating the first game in franchise history which took place at Shea Stadium on April 5, 1993, so the Rockies wore replicas of their original road uniforms for the occasion.

In 2014, the Mets once again paid tribute to the Negro leagues, this time as the Brooklyn Royal Giants for a game at Pittsburgh on June 28. The uniforms were royal blue with orange piping on the shoulders, sleeves and pants, and "ROYAL GIANTS" in thick orange capitals across the chest ("ROYAL" above "GIANTS"). The caps were also royal blue, with a large interlocking "RG" crest in orange. The jerseys had a circular patch on the left sleeve, the top part showing the orange "RG" logo on a blue background and the bottom part showing "ROYAL GIANTS" in serif capitals above "Brooklyn" in italic script, on a white background. These uniforms appeared again on June 20, 2015 and June 25, 2016, at Atlanta.

On July 20, 2016, the Mets wore replicas of their 1986 road uniforms for a game against the Chicago Cubs at Wrigley Field.

On September 11, 2021, the twentieth anniversary of the 9/11 attacks, in a home game against the Yankees, the Mets wore first-responder caps and special uniforms resembling the 1999-2011 home white alternates, with the road "NEW YORK" wordmark in place of the "Mets" script, an American flag patch on the back of the collar, and the "9-11-01" embroidery used in 2001-02 on the right sleeve. The batting helmets resembled the two-tone helmets used from 1998-2005, with an American flag decal above the left ear.

=== MLB-wide holiday and special event uniforms ===
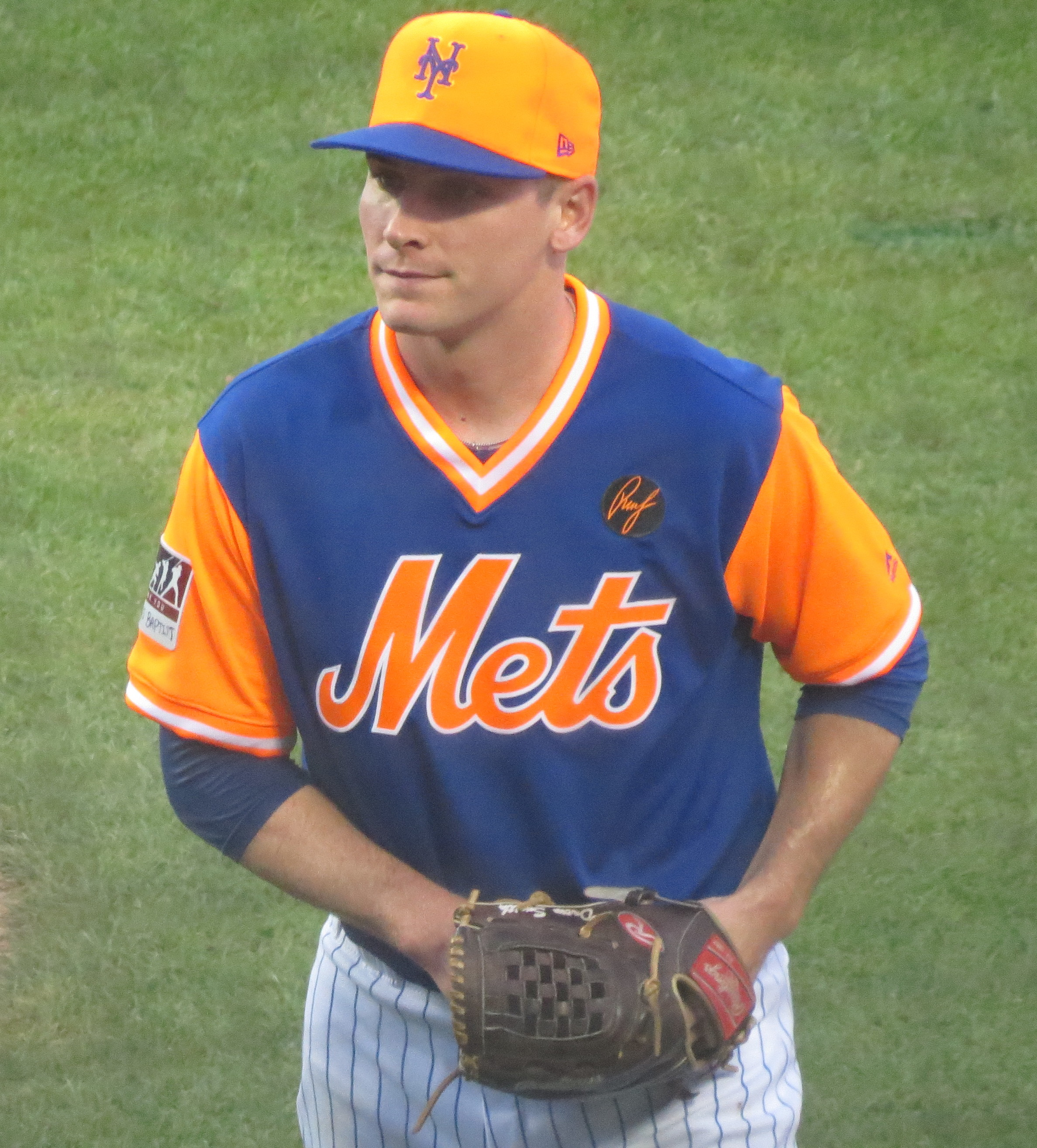
Drew Smith wearing the "Players Weekend" uniform in 2018, with the Rusty Staub memorial patch.

Beginning in 2013, MLB teams began wearing special uniforms on certain holidays and holiday weekends, with every team incorporating the same color and design scheme into its own uniform graphics template. The first such event was Memorial Day 2013 (May 27); the Mets' home pinstriped jerseys were modified with desert camouflage in place of blue in the wordmark, numerals, and lettering, outlined in orange, and the team also wore desert-camouflage caps with the "NY" logo in orange outlined in blue. The program expanded to Independence day in 2015, with an American-flag motif, then to Mother's Day with a pink motif and Father's Day with a light-blue motif in 2016. In 2017 and 2018 MLB had a "Players Weekend" in late August in which each team wore colorful uniforms inspired by Little League Baseball, with each player having a nickname in place of his surname on the back of the jersey.

These holiday/special event uniforms change from year to year, overtaking more or fewer uniform elements depending on the design and adding various patches, ribbons, and other graphics to the jerseys and caps, but maintaining the basic color motifs described above. In 2019, Armed Forces Day took over the military/camouflage motif from Memorial Day, which continues to be recognized with a jersey patch depicting a red poppy. There were no holiday or special-event uniforms worn in 2020, as the MLB season was delayed until July 23 and shortened to 60 games due to the COVID-19 pandemic.
