= Turn Ahead the Clock =

Major League Baseball promotional event

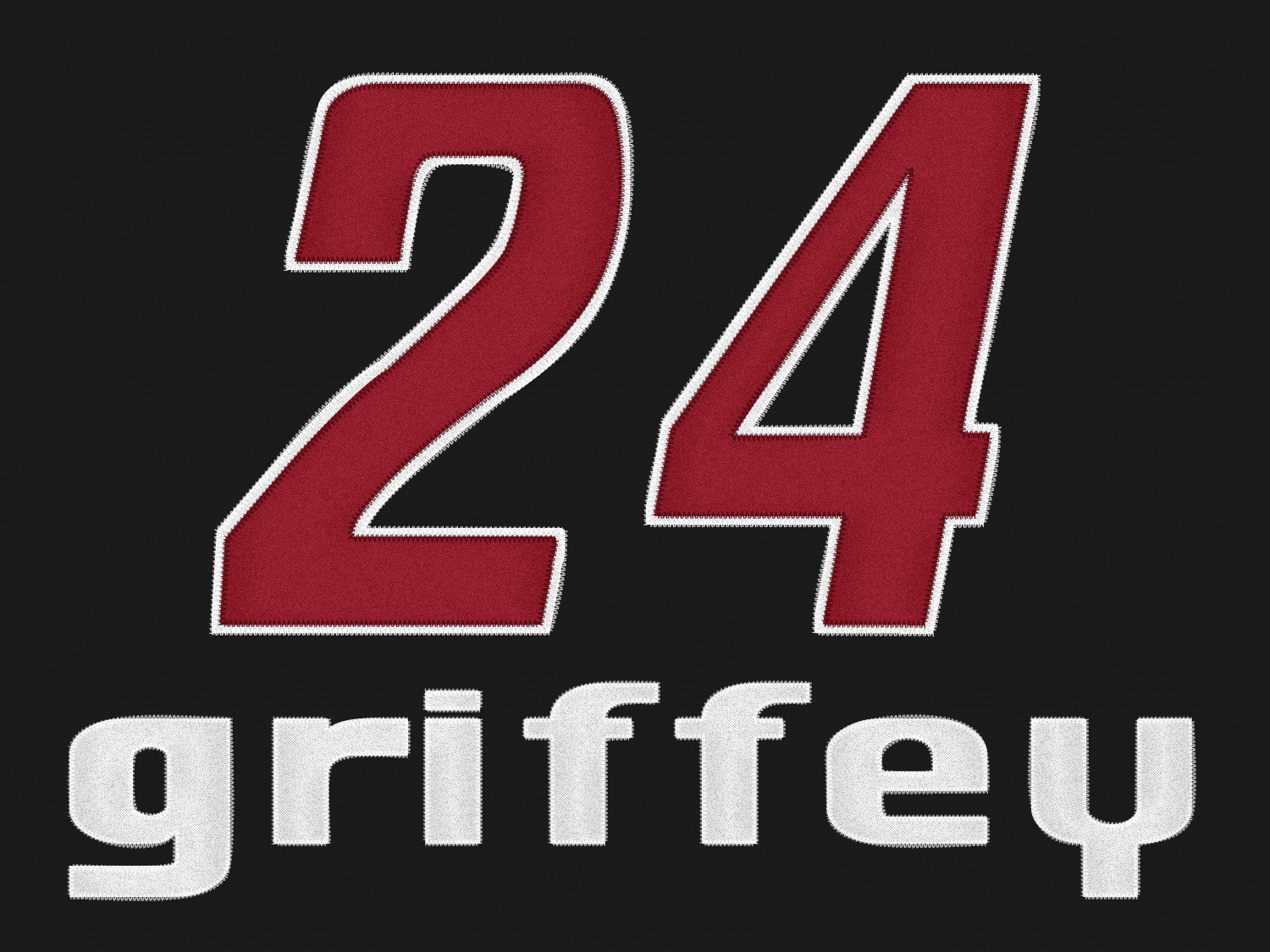
Replicated uniform from the Turn Ahead the Clock promotion.

Turn Ahead the Clock was a promotion in Major League Baseball (MLB). It was originated by the Seattle Mariners marketing team in the 1998 season. During the 1999 season, all but eight teams elected to wear the promotional uniforms that were in a "future" style. The uniforms were widely criticized and the promotion proved unsuccessful.

== Origin ==
Kevin Martinez, the marketing director for the Mariners in 1998, came up with the idea to have futuristic jerseys from the 2027 season as an alternative to "Turn Back the Clock" promotions. The marketing team transformed the Kingdome to give it a futuristic atmosphere. According to Martinez, Ken Griffey Jr. was instrumental in the design of the jerseys and came up with the idea to change the Mariners' colors from navy, teal, and white to crimson, black, and silver. Majestic Athletic worked with the Mariners' marketing team to create the uniform; the jersey front featured an oversized compass rose. Martinez himself described the jerseys as "gaudy."

The opponent for the promotion game on July 18 was the Kansas City Royals, who according to Martinez, were "fantastic to work with". Originally, the Mariners played with the jerseys un-tucked and turned their baseball caps backwards. Griffey painted his teammates baseball cleats with silver spray paint, and also convinced teammates to cut off the sleeves of their uniforms. The Royals wore yellow gold vests with royal blue sleeves, and white pants trimmed in blue and gold.

During the game, the umpires, who were wearing silver shirts as a part of the promotion, ruled that the un-tucked shirts gave batters an advantage because they could more easily be hit by a pitch (a ball touching the batter's clothing is considered a hit-by-pitch) so the umpires ruled that the players had to tuck them in. The Mariners promotion was considered successful, unlike the major league wide promotion in 1999. The futurism also extended to pregame festivities: the ceremonial first pitch was thrown out by actor James Doohan (Mr. Scott from Star Trek), who arrived at the pitcher's mound in a DeLorean and was given the ball by a robot created at the University of Washington. Seattle shortstop Alex Rodriguez broke a 4–4 tie in the seventh inning with a three-run homer and the M's won 8–5.

== 1999 season promotion ==
Major League Baseball sold the promotion concept to Century 21 Real Estate. The New York Yankees, Chicago Cubs, Toronto Blue Jays, Texas Rangers, Montreal Expos, Houston Astros, Cincinnati Reds, and Los Angeles Dodgers did not participate in the promotion. The teams that did participate wore special sleeveless jerseys with oversized front logos and players' surnames being printed on the side of the number, instead of its traditional place above the number. (This style was also used for the that year's All-Star Game batting practice uniforms.) Uniform changes ranged from the subtle (the St. Louis Cardinals changing the "birds on the bat" from living beings to robotic depictions) to the outlandish: the New York Mets changed their names to the "Mercury Mets" (complete with caps featuring the ☿ symbol) while hosting the Pittsburgh Pirates on July 27, 1999.

In games, which were "set" in the year 2021, stadiums would use futuristic graphics on their scoreboards as a part of the promotion. During a Padres / Giants game, fielding positions were renamed. Shortstop was renamed "intermediate station" and left field was renamed "left sector". Some ballpark advertisements also joined in, with Northwest Airlines becoming "Northwest Spacelines" (this can be seen when Mariners outfielder Butch Huskey crashed into the outfield wall during a game).

=== Criticism ===
Paul Lukas, writer for ESPN.com, described the promotion as "a concept that was goofy yet charming for one night became a bad joke when transmogrified into an extended vehicle for corporate sponsorship." Pitcher Greg Hansell was quoted as saying, "It looks like Halloween came early."

== 20th anniversary ==
The Seattle Mariners wore the 1998 "Turn Ahead the Clock" uniforms (as did their opponents, the Royals, who took part in the promotion in 1998) at Safeco Field on June 30, 2018, to commemorate the promotion's 20th anniversary.

== See also ==
- Turn Back the Clock (baseball), started in 1990
- City Connect, started in 2021
