= Turn Back the Clock (baseball) =

Baseball teams wearing throwback uniforms

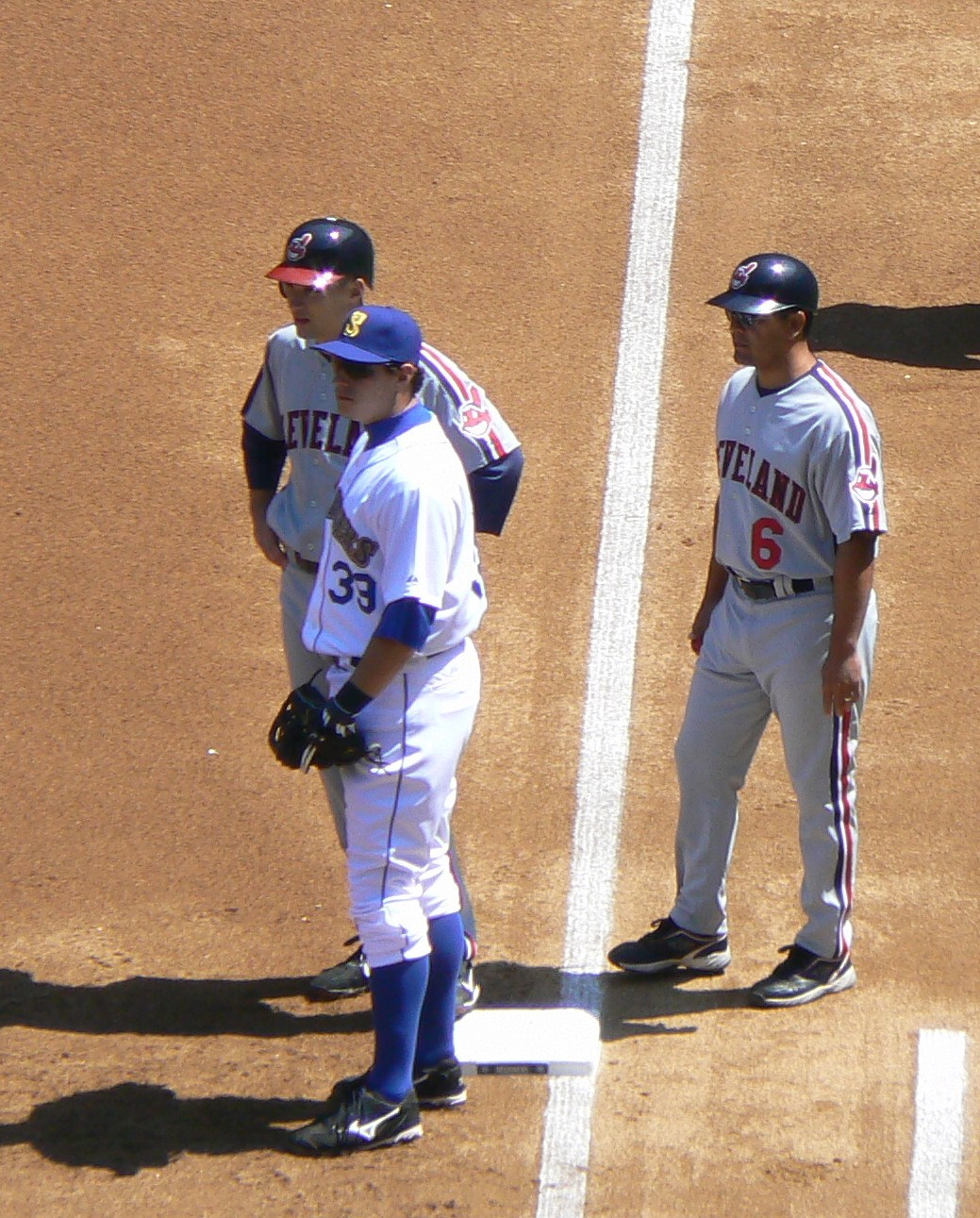
The Seattle Mariners and the Cleveland Indians participated in a "Turn Back the Clock" promotion in 2008 where they wore throwback uniforms from the 1989 season.

Turn Back the Clock is the name associated with the promotion by Major League Baseball (MLB) franchises when they wear throwback uniforms. Often, the uniforms signify a special event in the team or regions history. The promotion was originated in 1990 by the Chicago White Sox. Since then, multiple other teams have made it a yearly tradition.

== Origin ==
In 1990, the Chicago White Sox set up a "Turn Back the Clock" game against the Milwaukee Brewers on July 11. The White Sox dressed in 1917 uniforms, while the Brewers wore their normal uniforms. The promotion was aimed at celebrating Comiskey Park's final season. To set the early baseball atmosphere, ballpark ushers wore dated dress and some had megaphones to announce lineups. Also, ticket prices for general admission were $.50 and all other tickets were half price. The 1917 season was selected because it was the last time (at the time of the promotion) that the White Sox won a World Series. The promotion was considered successful.

== League-wide promotion ==
The Philadelphia Phillies were the second team to hold a TBTC game, June 16, 1991 against the Cincinnati Reds. Both teams wore throwback uniforms from the 1957 season. The Baltimore Orioles were the third team to use the marketing strategy after the Chicago White Sox. In that game, against the Minnesota Twins, the Orioles wore attire from the 1966 season and bleacher ticket prices were reduced to $.75. After that, the Chicago Cubs mimicked the promotion in 1992 wearing throwback uniforms. Likewise, the Milwaukee Brewers used the promotion in 1993 by wearing uniforms from the 1920s Milwaukee Brewers. Multiple other teams built off the concept over the seasons (including the wearing of Negro league uniforms).

A faux-back Turn Back the Clock game was featured on June 30, 2012, featuring the Tampa Bay Rays and the Detroit Tigers wearing uniforms from the 1979 season. The Rays, who did not exist as a franchise in 1979 (they were enfranchised in 1998), wore specially designed throwback uniforms for the game, using popular design cues of the time such as two-tone caps, colored pants and pullover tops.

=== "Turn Ahead the Clock" ===
In 1998, the Seattle Mariners marketing team developed a concept off the "Turn Back the Clock" promotion. In the "Turn Ahead the Clock", the team's uniforms would be transformed into a "futuristic" style. The Mariners promotion was successful, and in 1999 it was sold by Major League Baseball to Century 21 Real Estate, who made it into a league-wide marketing campaign. The league-wide promotion proved unsuccessful despite the success seen by the Mariners.
