= Major League Baseball uniforms =

The uniforms worn by Major League Baseball teams have changed significantly since professional baseball was first played in the 19th century. Over time they have adapted from improvised, wool uniforms to mass-produced team brands made from polyester. The official supplier for Major League Baseball uniforms is Nike, who has held the contract since 2020.

== Uniforms ==
=== Early days ===
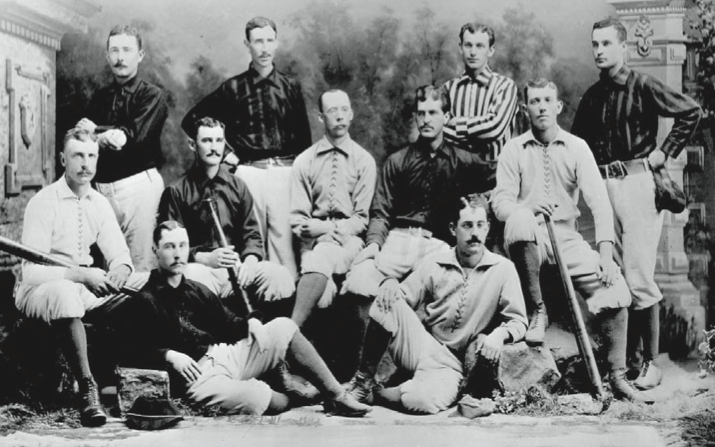
The Cincinnati Red Stockings (here pictured in 1882) popularized the adoption of sock color as the explicit identity of the club

The official rules of MLB require that all players on a team wear matching uniforms, although this rule was not enforced in the early days. Originally, teams were primarily distinguished by the colors of their stockings and the success of the Cincinnati Red Stockings popularized the adoption of sock color as the explicit identity of the club. The 1876 Chicago White Stockings actually wore caps of different colors. In 1882, the National League assigned stocking colors to the member clubs: red for Boston, white for Chicago, gray for Buffalo, blue for Worcester, gold for Detroit, green for Troy, and so on. That year, the league also assigned jersey and cap colors, but by player position rather than by club.

=== Changes ===
Traditionally, when playing at home, teams wore uniforms that were mostly white with trim in team colors and when playing away, they wore uniforms that were mostly gray with trim in team colors. Aside from the obvious need to distinguish one team from the other, conventional wisdom held that it was more difficult to properly launder uniforms while on a road trip, thus the "road grays" helped to hide accumulated soil. This convention continued well after its original premise was nullified by the issuance of multiple uniforms and the growth of the laundromat industry.

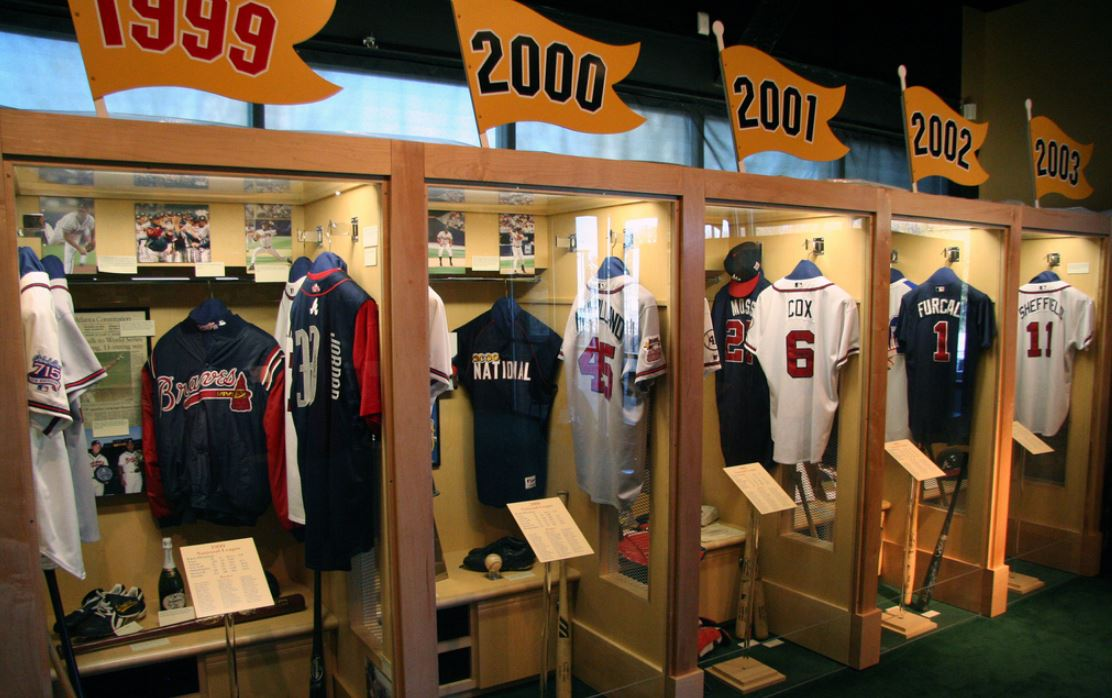
All-time uniforms displayed at the Atlanta Braves Museum in 2009

Starting in the 1970s, with the advent of synthetic fabrics, teams began using more color in their uniforms, notably the Kansas City Athletics in 1963, the San Diego Padres' brown-and-yellow scheme beginning in 1969, and the Houston Astros' rainbow stripes in the mid-1970s. This era also saw the emergence of powder blue as a primary road color, with teams such as the Kansas City Royals, Minnesota Twins, Montreal Expos and Philadelphia Phillies popularizing the look. Pullover jerseys also became a trend, with the Pittsburgh Pirates first popularizing the look in 1970, going as far as using multiple combinations of differently colored jerseys and trousers and caps (with the options of black, yellow, and white with pinstripes). At one point in the 1970s, the Cleveland Indians had an all-red uniform. From 1976 to 1981, the Chicago White Sox at times had an all-blue uniform, part of a radical style which included a jersey with a large collar, worn untucked—and, for two games in 1976, shorts. The pullover era peaked in 1978, when all but four teams had at least one pullover jersey. The only teams who continued to wear more traditional uniforms were the New York Yankees, Los Angeles Dodgers, Philadelphia Phillies and Montreal Expos. With colored tops becoming popular during this period, some teams stopped wearing road gray uniforms, mainly due to the fact that these uniforms are easily distinguishable. By the mid-1980s, however, the road grays would return, and the trend of colored jerseys would not return until the mid-1990s. As for pullovers, the Cincinnati Reds became the last team to wear them regularly, returning to a more traditional design after 1992. The pullover style wouldn't return until 2024 when the Washington Nationals wore a white pullover alternate.

Most uniform tops featured sleeves, but in 1940, the Chicago Cubs introduced the vest/undershirt combination for three seasons. The traditional uniform top was worn but the sleeves were removed, exposing the colored undershirt. The Cubs' experiment was short-lived, but other teams tried to incorporate uniform vests into the rotation. The Cincinnati Reds went through several brief periods wearing vests, the last coming in 2006. The Pittsburgh Pirates won the 1960 World Series while wearing vests, and continued to do so on-and-off until 2008. In the 1990s and early 2000s, almost half of Major League teams incorporated vests to their uniforms, the most prominent being the Florida Marlins and Arizona Diamondbacks who respectively won the 1997 and 2001 World Series while wearing vests. Teams such as the Anaheim Angels and Toronto Blue Jays incorporated a 'faux-vest' uniform, featuring contrasting color sleeves to simulate the look. However, merchandising concerns led to the demise of the uniform vest, with the Colorado Rockies in 2021 being the last team to wear a uniform vest.

In his comedy routine "Baseball & Football", George Carlin observes that in baseball, as compared to football, the manager is required to wear the same uniform the players do. However, this was actually not true in the early years of the game. Player-managers were common, but non-playing managers whose realm was strictly the dugout often wore business suits, a common occurrence at the time. Retired players who became managers were more likely to continue to wear a baseball uniform (John McGraw, for example, although he later switched to wearing a suit), especially if they were also active on the coaching lines; managers often doubled as third-base coach. By the late 1940s, nearly all managers were wearing baseball uniforms. Connie Mack was the last major league manager to wear a suit in the dugout until his retirement in the early 1950s; however, in contrast to the uniform-wearing managers, Mack rarely if ever stepped onto the field during a game; instead he sent uniformed coaches onto the field when a managerial presence outside the dugout was required.

=== Modern era ===
Starting in the 1990s, MLB clubs began heavily marketing licensed goods, such as caps and uniform jerseys to the public and this has resulted in a wide array of uniforms for each team. Now, some teams have not only a basic home uniform and away uniform, but also special "Sunday game" uniforms and uniforms worn only during batting practice and uniforms worn on singular events. From time to time, individual MLB teams have held "Turn Back the Clock Day", regularly scheduled games in which teams donned uniforms in styles their predecessors wore generations earlier (sometimes called "throwback" uniforms), or other antique-style uniforms such as those of Negro league clubs. The Los Angeles Dodgers occasionally use the livery of their original identity as the Brooklyn Dodgers, on special anniversaries or occasions, for example such as in honor of the retirement of Jackie Robinson's uniform number 42 throughout professional baseball (on April 15 – the anniversary of Robinson's MLB debut – entire teams often wear 42). In addition, in 1999, MLB staged "Turn Ahead the Clock Day", in which teams wore uniforms that were built around a "futuristic" theme, including science fiction references, such as the New York Mets being referred to as the "Mercury Mets."

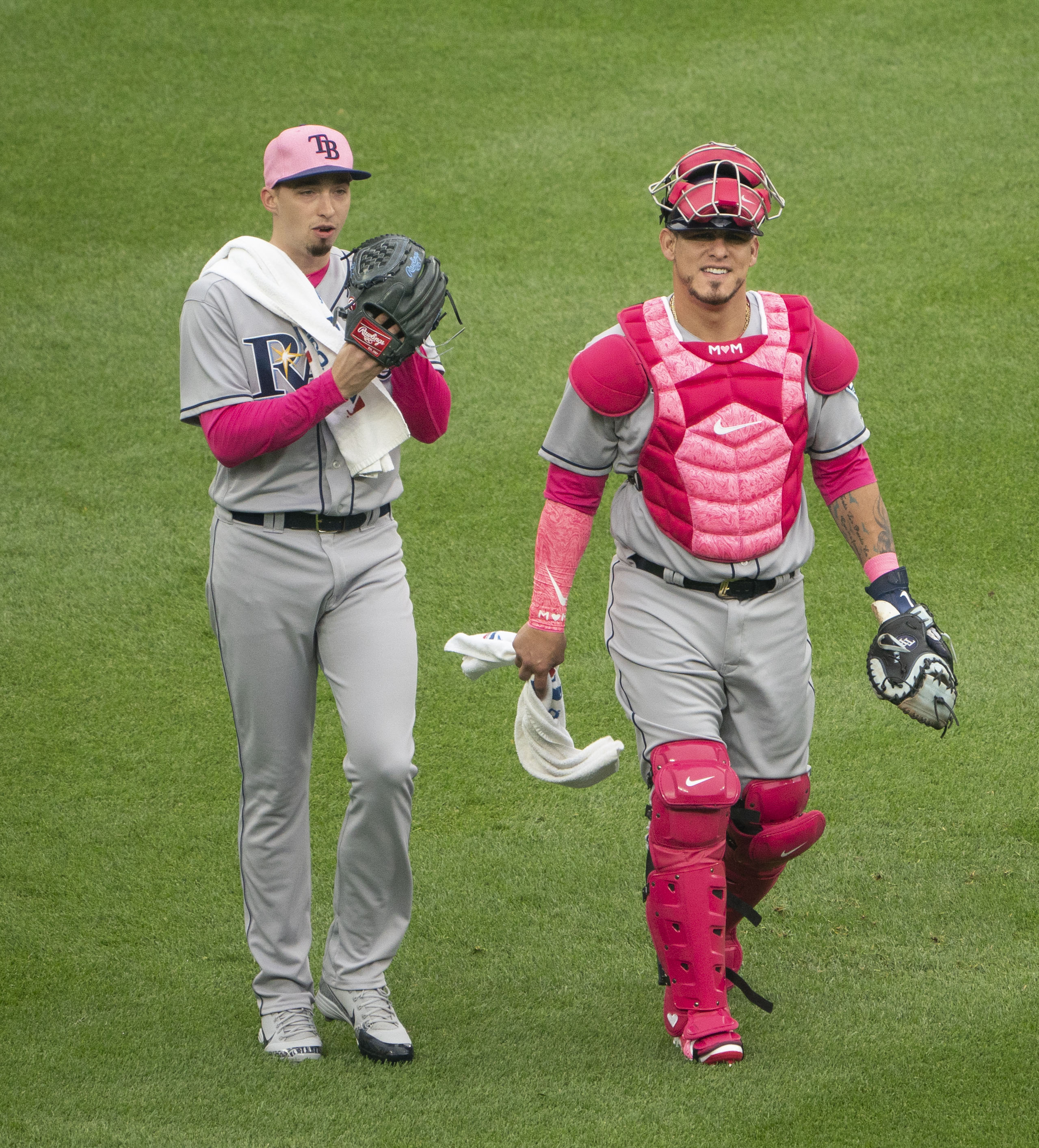
Blake Snell (left) and Wilson Ramos of the Tampa Bay Rays wearing "Mothers' Day" attire in 2018

For example, from 1999 to 2006 the Cincinnati Reds wore a variety of caps: all red, red crown and black bill, black crown and red bill, and all black, but since 2007, only the all-red (home) and red crown/black bill (away) are used. In contrast from the pre-1970s era, in which there usually was just one home uniform and one road uniform (with certain exceptions, such as Oakland and Pittsburgh's complex combinations), today choices of what combination of uniform elements are worn are now sometimes left up to players. In some cases, aspects of the uniform that are considered official are rarely worn, such as the New York Mets' blue home cap, with the orange button, which was rarely seen on the field in the years 1998–2012 in favor of an "alternate" black-and-blue cap. The Mets added the orange button on their blue caps in 1995. Through 2025, the New York Yankees and Los Angeles Dodgers wear uniforms which have changed little since the 1930s – while the Detroit Tigers have worn essentially the same home uniform during that span (only the Tigers, Yankees, and Chicago White Sox retain the once-common practice of placing the cap insignia on their home whites, though many teams, including the White Sox, do so on alternate jerseys), their road grays have changed more often. The Dodgers did, however, started wearing two road uniforms regularly in 2014 – one which featured the team name and another which featured the city name; the former is currently their primary road uniform. The Tigers, who for one game in 1995 wore an alternate navy blue uniform, did not unveil another full-time alternate until 2026, when they started wearing an orange alternate at home and a navy blue alternate on the road. This leaves the Yankees as the only MLB team without an official alternate uniform.

Starting in 2023, Major League teams are limited to a home, away and two alternate uniforms, as well as the City Connect uniform. As a result, a number of teams began to veer away from wearing gray uniforms on road games, something that was not seen since the "pullover" era of the 1970s–1980s.

In 2024, Nike and Fanatics received harsh criticism after modifying the template of each Major League uniform to the new Vapor Premier chassis. The most notable changes included lowering the MLB "batterman" logo below the neck piping (on some teams), shrinking the size of the letters on each player's name, and lack of customization options. While the intent was to make the uniform lighter and more breathable, players and fans disliked the newly-revamped uniforms for its poor quality. In 2025, Nike reversed some of these changes, including reverting to the former lettering sizes and fabric on gray uniforms, with more changes planned for 2026.

=== Teams and cities displaying ===
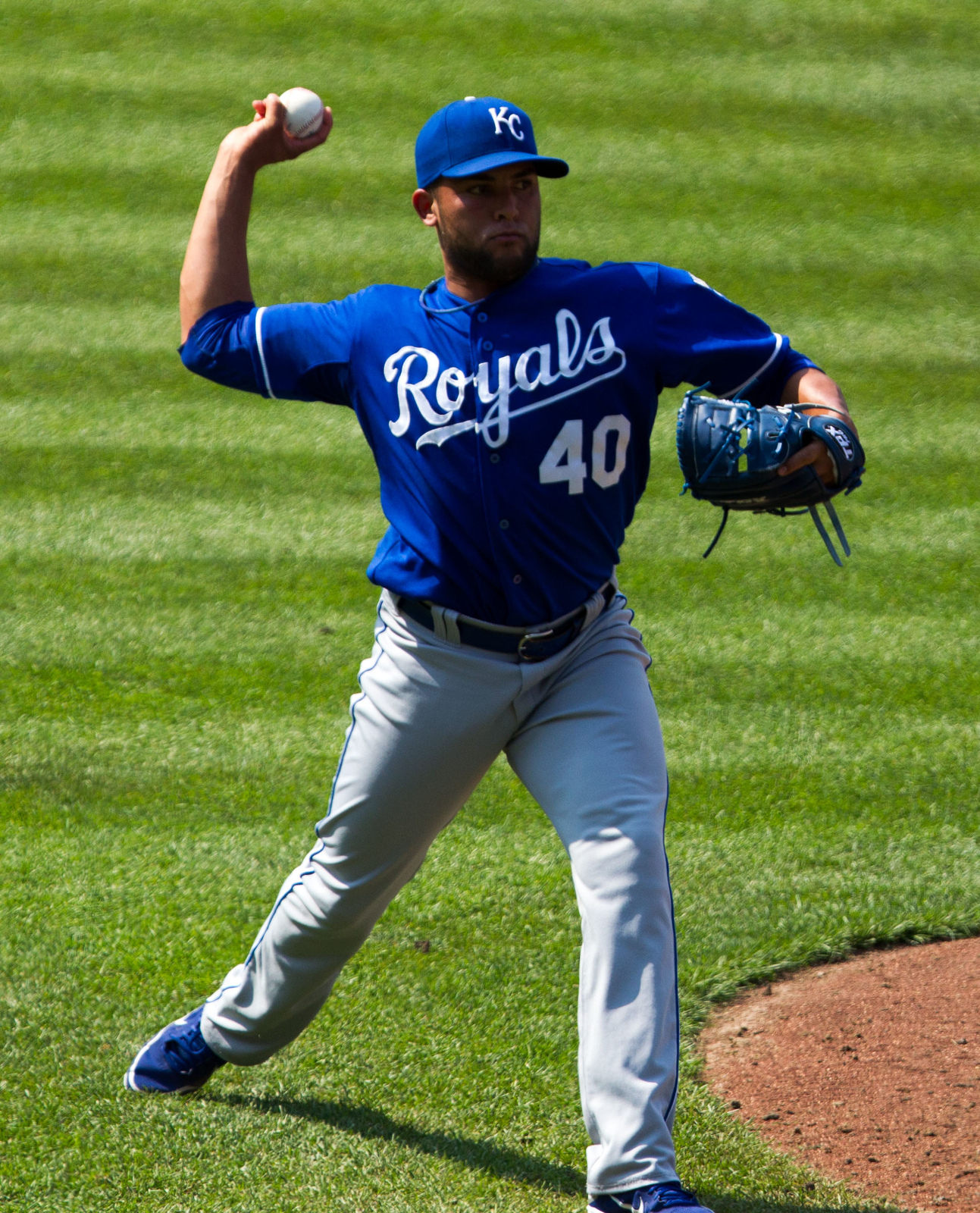
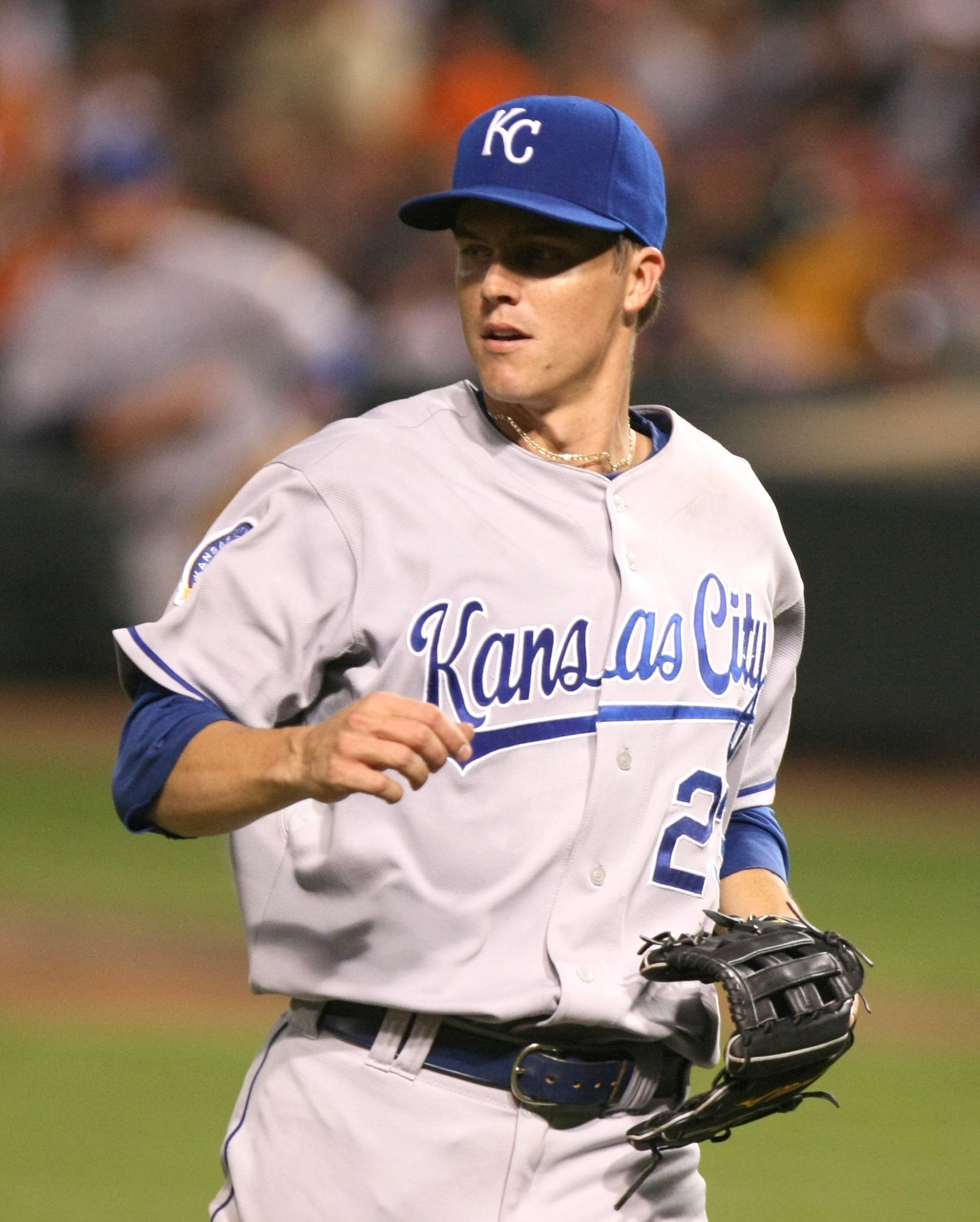
Kansas City Royals alternate uniform (left) with the team name on the chest; the away version (right) features the city of origin

Typically, home uniforms feature the team's nickname, while away uniforms feature the name of the team's geographic designation. Currently, the Tampa Bay Rays, Los Angeles Angels, Philadelphia Phillies, St. Louis Cardinals, and Athletics are the only exceptions to this rule, although the Cardinals' aforementioned 2013 alternate placed "St. Louis" on their jerseys for the first time since 1932. In 2026, the Athletics introduced a gold alternate jersey with “Sacramento” across the chest to acknowledge their temporary home. These teams feature the club nickname on both the home and away uniforms (since 1900, in 169 seasons – including the Athletics' presence in the city from 1901 to 1954 – the full word "Philadelphia" has never appeared on a Major League jersey). The Milwaukee Brewers did not display their city name on their road gray jerseys from 2000 to 2019, and from 2000 to 2009, had an alternate blue jersey with "Brewers" on the front. They introduced a navy jersey with "Milwaukee" on the front in 2010, but kept the navy alternate with "Brewers" on the front; both navy jerseys were worn interchangeably at home and on the road for the next ten seasons.. The Brewers redesigned their uniforms for 2020, with "Milwaukee" on the front of the road grays for the first time since 1999.

From 1973 to 2008, the Baltimore Orioles were part of this group – the omission of the city's name being part of a largely successful effort to attract fans from the Washington, D.C. area – before returning "Baltimore" to the road jerseys in 2009, by which time the current Nationals franchise had begun playing in Washington, D.C. In 2014, the Los Angeles Dodgers and Chicago Cubs partially joined this group, carrying one road jersey with the city name and another with the team name, and wearing both interchangeably; in only the third game of the season, one player accidentally played the first inning in the "Chicago" jersey while the team wore "Cubs"; the Cubs dropped the alternate road jersey in 2016, leaving the "Chicago" version as the lone style.

As of 2020, only one team wears their city/state name on their home uniforms, the Miami Marlins. From 2009 to 2019, the Texas Rangers wore their state name on all of their jerseys, but introduced a new uniform set for 2020 to coincide with the move to Globe Life Field which displays "Rangers" on the white jersey.

The Chicago White Sox wore uniforms which displayed the city name on the home white and away blue uniforms from 1976-81, then swung the other way from 1982-86, displaying "SOX" in large lettering across the chest of both of their pullover uniforms (white and gray).

A number of teams do not display their team nickname on their home uniforms. Instead, they place the team logo or insignia in front. The most famous example is the New York Yankees' classic pinstripe home uniforms featuring the interlocking "NY" logo. Other examples include the Detroit Tigers' Old English "D", the Arizona Diamondbacks' A (which they returned to for the 2024 season).

MLB jerseys worn on the field have been made out of double-knit polyester since the early 1970s. The Pittsburgh Pirates were the first to switch when they opened Three Rivers Stadium following the 1970 All-Star Game. The Cardinals followed suit to open 1971, and the Orioles made a gradual change until adopting them full-time for that season's ALCS.

16 teams debuted double-knits to open 1972; the Red Sox adopted them after the All-Star Game, and the Giants debuted them at home only at mid-season as well. The final flannel holdouts, the Expos, Royals, (who were scheduled to convert to knits in 1972 to coincide with the opening of their new stadium, but remained in flannels when construction was delayed) and Yankees, converted to open the 1973 season.

Jerseys have featured an MLB logo on the back collar since 2000, whereas MLB on-field caps have featured an MLB logo on the back since 1992. Until 2007, MLB caps were made out of wool, with a gray underbrim having become common by the late 1980s. (The New York Yankees were among the last MLB teams to wear caps with the previously common kelly green underbrim, only switching their caps to the gray underbrim in 1994.) In 2007, all standard MLB caps were made of polyester, with a black underbrim to reduce glare. Since 1993, the New Era Cap Company serves as the official cap provider of MLB, with all teams wearing the standard 59Fifty cap in-game. Players and coaches were supplied with the "low-profile" variation of the 59Fifty, which featured a pre-curved visor, whereas the original flat-brimmed version is sold on retail stores.

=== Jersey numbers ===
Jersey numbers were first used in Major League Baseball by the Cleveland Indians on June 26, 1916. The Indians were inspired by football and hockey teams using numbers. The team donned the numbers on their sleeve and only did so for a few weeks as an experiment.

Jersey numbers would not appear again in the Major Leagues until 1923, when St. Louis Cardinals' manager Branch Rickey decided to add numbers to the sleeves on a recommendation by sportswriter John Sheridan. The team was subject to criticism for wearing numbers on their uniforms by opposing teams and fans. Ricky was quoted as saying, "The effect upon the team was bad and ‘busted up’ the team morale or spirit completely. They really didn't want to show themselves on the field. Because of the continuing embarrassment to the players, the numbers were removed." Jersey numbers fell out of use again until 1929.

In 1929, the Cleveland Indians and the New York Yankees both introduced jerseys with numbers on the back. On April 16, 1929, the Yankees opening game was cancelled due to rain while the Indians played, becoming the first team to wear numbers on the back. By the mid-1930s every team in Major League Baseball was wearing numbers on the back of jerseys except the Philadelphia Athletics. The Athletics later added numbers to their jerseys in 1939.

The first jersey number retired by a team was #4 by the New York Yankees to honor Lou Gehrig. In 1997, MLB retired Jackie Robinson's #42 league wide, the first and only number that no player is allowed to wear anymore. As of April 15, 1997 #42 was retired except for players wearing the number prior to it being retired. Mariano Rivera was the last player to wear #42 when he retired in 2013. Every April 15 since 2009 every player, manager, and umpire wears #42 to commemorate Jackie Robinson. April 15th is now known as Jackie Robinson day.

== Official rules ==
The official rules state that:

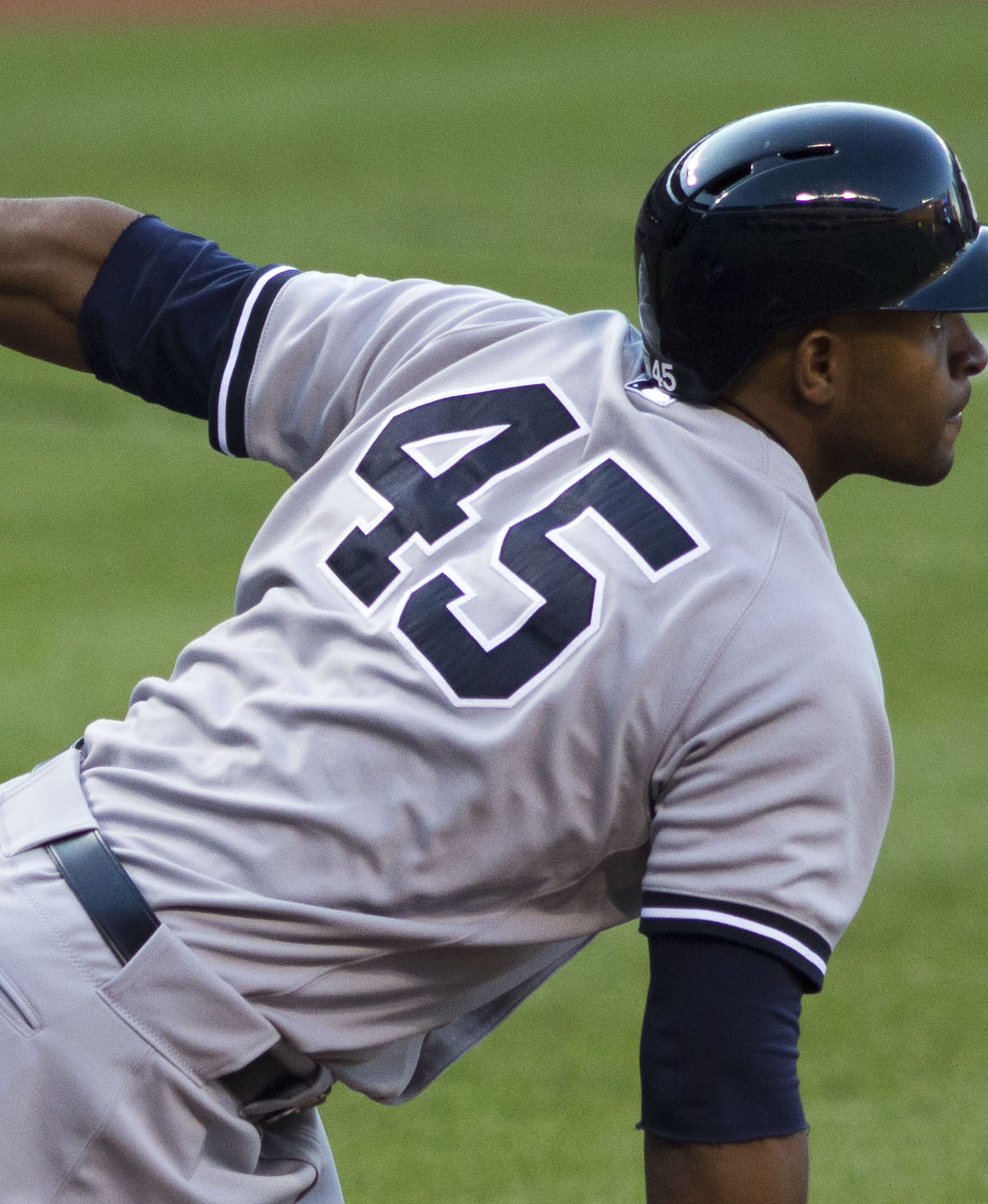
The Yankees uniforms do not display player names on their uniform backs, as can be seen on Zoilo Almonte's jersey during a game in 2013

- All players on a team must wear identical uniforms during a single game.
- Numbers: All players must wear their uniform numbers on the back of the uniform.
- Undershirt: If the undershirt is exposed then all the players on the team must wear matching ones. Numbers or other devices may be worn on the sleeve of the undershirt (for example, if it is worn with a sleeveless jersey), except that pitchers may not have such devices on their undershirt sleeves.
- Colors: The league office might require that each team have a single uniform for all games or requires that each team have a single, white home uniform and a single, non-white away uniform. With the elimination of the separate American League and National League administrations, this rule is most often seen in use in the minor leagues.
- Sleeve length: The rules allow for minor variation in sleeve length, but they must be "approximately the same length" and the sleeves may not be "ragged, frayed or slit."
- No attachments: Tape or other attachments of non-matching color may not be used on uniforms. Pants may not be attached to the bottom of the shoe in any manner.
- No images of baseballs: No "pattern that imitates or suggests the shape of a baseball" may be used on uniforms. Notably, in apparent violation of this rule, several teams have used cap or jersey logos that have incorporated a baseball in their design, such as the Toronto Blue Jays, Philadelphia Phillies, Miami Marlins, Minnesota Twins, Milwaukee Brewers, New York Mets, Los Angeles Angels, Colorado Rockies, San Francisco Giants, and the Seattle Mariners. However, in each of these cases, the baseball element of each logo is either obscured by another logo element, or rendered so small as not to be confused with an actual baseball. The purpose of this rule is to prevent one team from deceiving the other. (The National Football League has a similar rule, which states that no pattern that imitates or suggests the shape of a football.)
- No glass buttons or polished metal.
- Commercial advertisements on uniforms: While almost completely prohibited by MLB before 2022, The 2022-2027 Collective Bargaining agreement allows a small shoulder patch with a corporate logo or image on one sleeve of the Uniform, as well as the batting helmets. As such patches are optional, the players have allowed them to raise money for their clubs. All other commercial advertisements are forbidden.
- Names: "A league may provide that the uniforms of its member teams include the names of its players on their backs. Any name other than the last name of the player must be approved by the League President. If adopted, all uniforms for a team must have the names of its players." Again, with the elimination of separate administrations for the American and National leagues, this rule is more often invoked by the minor leagues. (Ichiro Suzuki, formerly of the Seattle Mariners, is the last player to have his given name rather than his family name displayed on the back of his uniform, having applied for this permission in order to continue being identified as he had been in the Japanese leagues. Vida Blue also used his first name on the back of his uniform when he played for the San Francisco Giants in the mid-1980s). As of 2023, the New York Yankees and Boston Red Sox do not display their players' names on their home uniforms; the Yankees also do not display them on their road uniforms. The Seattle Mariners' cream home alternate uniforms, introduced in 2015, also went without player names. In 2023, the Texas Rangers unveiled their cream City Connect uniform which does not have player names on the back. The Chicago White Sox were the first team to add player names to their uniform, doing so on their 1960 road uniform, and then added them on the home uniform the next year. The White Sox then removed the player names in 1971 before bringing them back in 1976. Names were removed again from 1987 to 1990, but were added only on the road uniform midway through 1990. Their alternate black uniform would have player names when first introduced in 1991. Player names would return to the home uniform in 1997. The San Francisco Giants adopted names on their uniforms in the 1970s but removed them from the home uniform in 2000. The Giants also went without names in their orange (starting in 2010) and black (2001 and starting in 2015) alternate uniforms, but added names to their home and alternate uniforms in 2021. The New York Mets used alternate home uniforms without last names for the 1999 season. The names were returned the next season. The Chicago Cubs, who did not display names on their home jerseys until 1993, did not have names on their home or alternate jerseys for the 2005 and 2006 seasons. The names are now back on both jerseys. The Los Angeles Dodgers did not have names on the back of their home and road jerseys for the 2005 and 2006 seasons. Names returned on both jerseys in 2007. The Minnesota Twins did not feature names on the back of three different "throwback" alternate uniforms, used in 2009, 2010, 2011, and 2018. The Cleveland Indians wore cream alternate home uniforms without player names from 2008 to 2016.
  - The National League adopted a rule in 1979 that all teams must display names on their away jerseys. In 1978, four NL teams--the Braves, Cubs, Mets and Pirates--did not have player names on their jerseys. The Mets and Pirates immediately added names to all of their jerseys, while the Braves and Cubs only did so for their away jerseys. The Braves added names to their home jerseys in 1980 when they were redesigned, but the Cubs did not until 1993. The rule was discarded when separate league offices were eliminated.

Another apparent violation of the concept of a "uniform" is that some players on a team will wear the traditional knee-breeches or "knickers" while other teammates are wearing the more-recent ankle-length, closely cut trousers. Many clubs do this at both major and minor league level, with no apparent objections. Furthermore, advertisement patches introduced in 2023 are often placed on each individual player's front-facing sleeve, violating the concept of an "identical uniform".

On game days that do not require a special uniform (either by team or MLB request) it is generally (but not always) the starting pitcher for a team that chooses the uniform to be worn for that day's game.

== See also ==
- Baseball uniform
- City Connect, an alternate uniform introduced in 2021, 2022 and 2023 for many MLB teams
- Major League Baseball § Uniforms
