= 2024 Major League Baseball uniform controversy =

2024 MLB jersey controversy

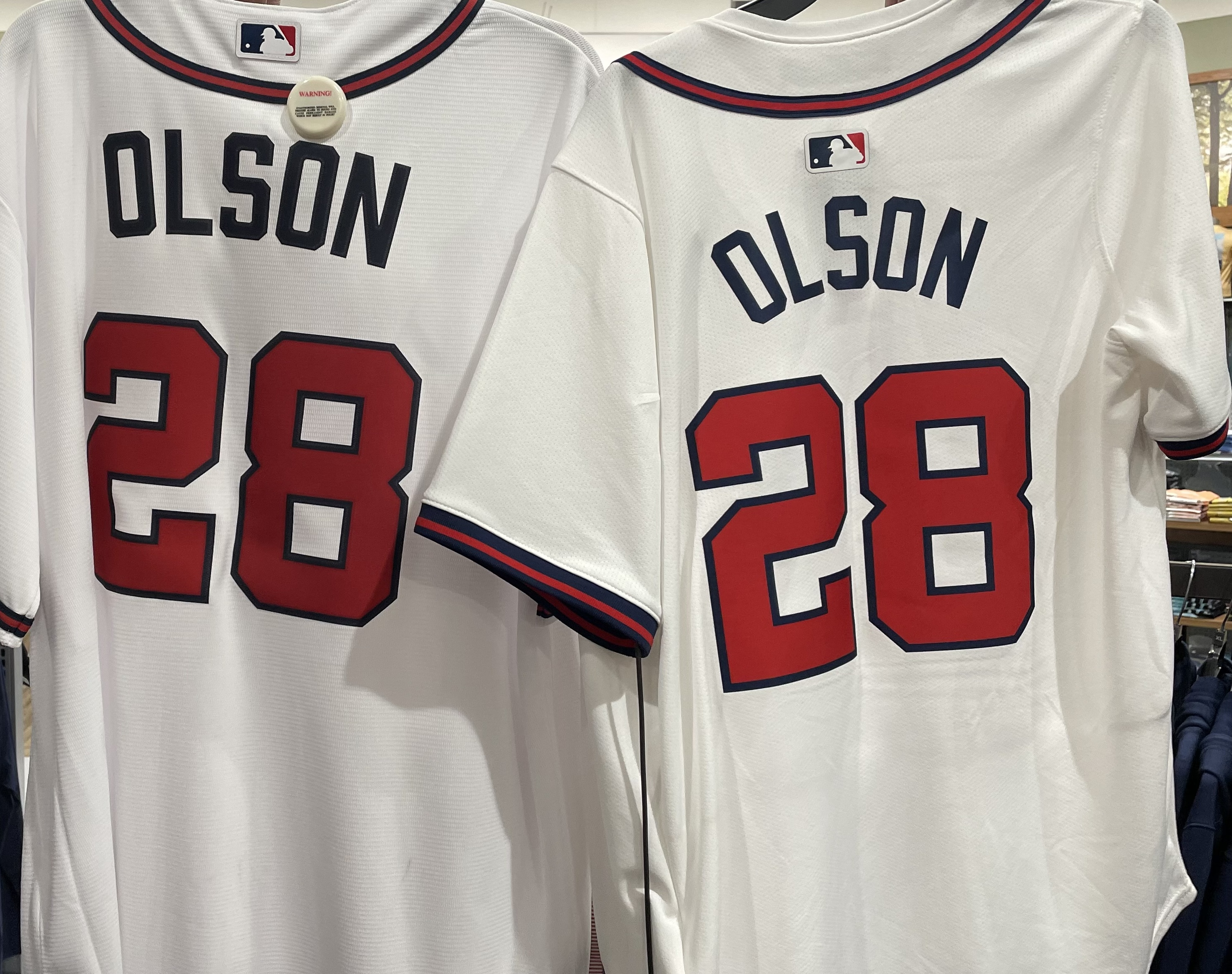
A comparison between an old Majestic template jersey (left) and a new Nike template jersey (right).

Beginning in the 2024 season, Major League Baseball (MLB) adopted a new template for its uniforms, designed by Nike and produced by Fanatics, officially titled the Nike Vapor Premier. The new uniforms have been subject to much controversy and criticism. While some players have praised the new uniform's feel and mobility, other players and fans have complained that the jerseys are of poor quality.

== Background ==
From 2005 to 2019, MLB uniforms were manufactured by Majestic Athletic, which was purchased by Fanatics in 2017. Nike and Fanatics began designing the new uniforms in 2018, with more than 300 players undergoing body scans to analyze how the players wore the jerseys. In 2020, Nike agreed to take over the MLB's uniform contract and Fanatics would instead oversee the distribution of merchandise to consumers. During the 2023 Major League Baseball All-Star Game, Nike debuted the new Vapor Premier template.

== Controversy ==
=== Design ===
Controversy arose surrounding the new pants designed for the uniforms, which were made of very thin and partially see-through fabric. The issue was brought to further attention after a photo of San Francisco Giants infielder Casey Schmitt modeling the uniform went viral due to the revealing nature of the tight pants. The translucency of the pants was also showcased when Shohei Ohtani posed for a photo, and his jersey tail could be seen through the pants. In a video posted by the Seattle Mariners of catcher Cal Raleigh, his jersey could clearly be seen tucked in through his pants. During a spring training game between the San Diego Padres and Los Angeles Dodgers, a not-safe-for-work photo of an unnamed Padres player began to surface, revealing the player's "sensitive areas". During a St. Louis Cardinals spring training game, pitcher Miles Mikolas and other Cardinals players' jerseys appeared to be two distinctly different shades of gray.

=== Supply ===
The new uniforms were also subject to supply shortages, with teams on occasion not receiving them during the season. Controversy arose after it was revealed that there was a shortage of pants and that Cincinnati Reds personnel would have to wear pants from previous seasons during the remainder of spring training. The Texas Rangers and Milwaukee Brewers were forced to push back the use of their City Connect uniforms from April 5 to April 26 because both teams had not received the uniforms from Fanatics. On April 29, New York Mets outfielder Brandon Nimmo admitted that the reason the Mets had not worn their standard blue or black jerseys a month into the season was that the team had not received the pants that coordinate with the jerseys.

== Reactions ==
=== Players ===
Some players have defended the new jerseys because of their better fit and improved mobility. Baltimore Orioles catcher Adley Rutschman stated that the uniform would "make a difference during those hot summer games when I'm in full gear" and Atlanta Braves outfielder Ronald Acuña Jr. stated that the jerseys, "fit better and feel lighter", in an MLB press release. Seattle Mariners pitcher Logan Gilbert praised the jerseys for their thinness and described them as "feeling great". MLB Commissioner Rob Manfred maintained that the jerseys would become popular and affirmed that the jerseys were designed by Nike and not Fanatics.

On the other hand, many players have criticized the jerseys for their appearance and quality. Upon reporting to spring training, one Baltimore Orioles player was reported to have compared the new jerseys to knockoffs from TJ Maxx. In an interview, Philadelphia Phillies shortstop Trea Turner said that "everyone hates" the new jerseys. Phillies pitcher Matt Strahm noted that the players' names were printed smaller on the back and the league should not try to "fix what's not broken". Los Angeles Angels outfielder Taylor Ward described the jerseys as looking like papery replicas that did not meet the standard for Major League uniforms. Boston Red Sox reliever Zack Kelly compared the numbers to iron-ons and publicly expressed his desire for the uniforms to be changed.

=== Fans ===
Many fans have expressed their outrage with the new uniforms, criticizing their cheap looks and the seemingly transparent pants. Fans have also displayed dismay over the changes to the font and overall quality of the new uniforms. One fan posted a screenshot of a photo from Michael Chavis' Instagram of his new jersey to X (Twitter), to which the Fanatics customer support account responded. The now deleted reply stated, "Hey there, it looks like we dropped the ball on this one", before proceeding to request a direct message for more information. Some fans have drawn comparisons between the new uniforms and the Seinfeld episode "The Chaperone", in which George Costanza proposes to Yankees manager Buck Showalter that the team would perform better with new cotton uniforms. The controversy also added to ongoing concerns by National Hockey League fans that their jerseys may suffer from quality drops following Fanatics' ten-year jersey exclusivity deal starting with the 2024–25 NHL season.

=== Nike and Fanatics ===
In response to input provided by teams, Nike stated that different options will be evaluated in an effort to "lessen the moisture-related aesthetic color differences". Michael Rubin, founder of Fanatics, expressed his belief that the issues with the uniforms are being unfairly blamed on Fanatics, going on to say, "we're getting the shit kicked out of us".

== Aftermath ==
In late April 2024, the Major League Baseball Players Association sent a memo to players stating that the uniforms would be overhauled, at the latest by the start of the 2025 season, hoping to rectify many of the complaints aimed at Nike's Vapor Premier template. These included a return to the larger name lettering, fixing the mismatched shades of grey for jerseys and pants, examining the Vapor Premier's "propensity to collect sweat", and a fix for the pants with a return to "the higher quality zipper used in 2023" and addressing their see-through nature. The MLBPA "placed the blame on Nike" and the Vapor Premier uniform, claiming "Nike was innovating something that didn't need to be innovated", while "absolv[ing] Fanatics".

Before the 2025 season, players and fans were pleased with many of the issues concerning the Vapor Premier uniforms being corrected. Nike confirmed that road gray uniforms would use the pre-2024 fabric, with the home white uniforms to follow by 2026.
