= '47 (brand) =

American clothing brand

- Formerly: Twins Enterprises, '47 Brand
- Type: Subsidiary
- Industry: Apparel
- Founded: Boston, Massachusetts, U.S. (1947; 79 years ago)
- Founders: Henry and Arthur D'Angelo
- Headquarters: Westwood, Massachusetts
- Key people: Dominic Farrell (president)
- Products: Sports licensing, headwear, apparel
- Parent: New Era Cap Company
- Website: www.47brand.com

'47 is an American lifestyle brand that brings together sports, fashion, and cultural influences. It offers a wide range of licensed headwear, apparel and gear tailored for men, women, and children. The brand has been owned by New Era Cap Company since August 2024.

== Founders ==
Company founders Arthur and Henry D'Angelo, were born in Orsogna, Italy in 1926 and arrived in the United States in 1938 at age 12 and soon began selling various items, including baseball pennants for two cents, and sold them near Fenway Park where the Boston Red Sox play. In 1947, the brothers acquired a street cart to increase their sales—that was the beginning of what became '47. The name '47 honors the heritage of the founding of the business.

Fueled by their entrepreneurial spirit and love of baseball, the D'Angelos became the founding fathers of the sports licensed industry of today. Arthur and Henry were well-known to the Red Sox, including players Ted Williams and Carl Yastrzemski. When Williams joked that the brothers were profiting on his fame by selling gear with the team's name and logo, Arthur reportedly replied with a laugh, "We're making you famous!"

In 1977, Arthur's oldest son, Robert, joined the business. Over the next nine years, Arthur's three other sons—Mark, David, and Steven—joined as well. Henry D'Angelo died from cancer in 1987.

On September 21, 2013, the Red Sox and then-mayor Thomas Menino honored Arthur D'Angelo by naming a street near Fenway Park after him: Arthur's Way. After the street dedication, the D'Angelo family and the Red Sox presented a check for $1,422,547 from '47 to Mayor Menino for The One Fund, which assists victims and family members affected by the 2013 Boston Marathon bombing. The Red Sox and '47 Brand partnered to create B Strong baseball caps and t-shirts, with proceeds benefiting The One Fund.

Arthur D'Angelo died on February 29, 2024. The Boston Globe called him the "all-star" of Fenway Park souvenirs and apparel.

== History ==
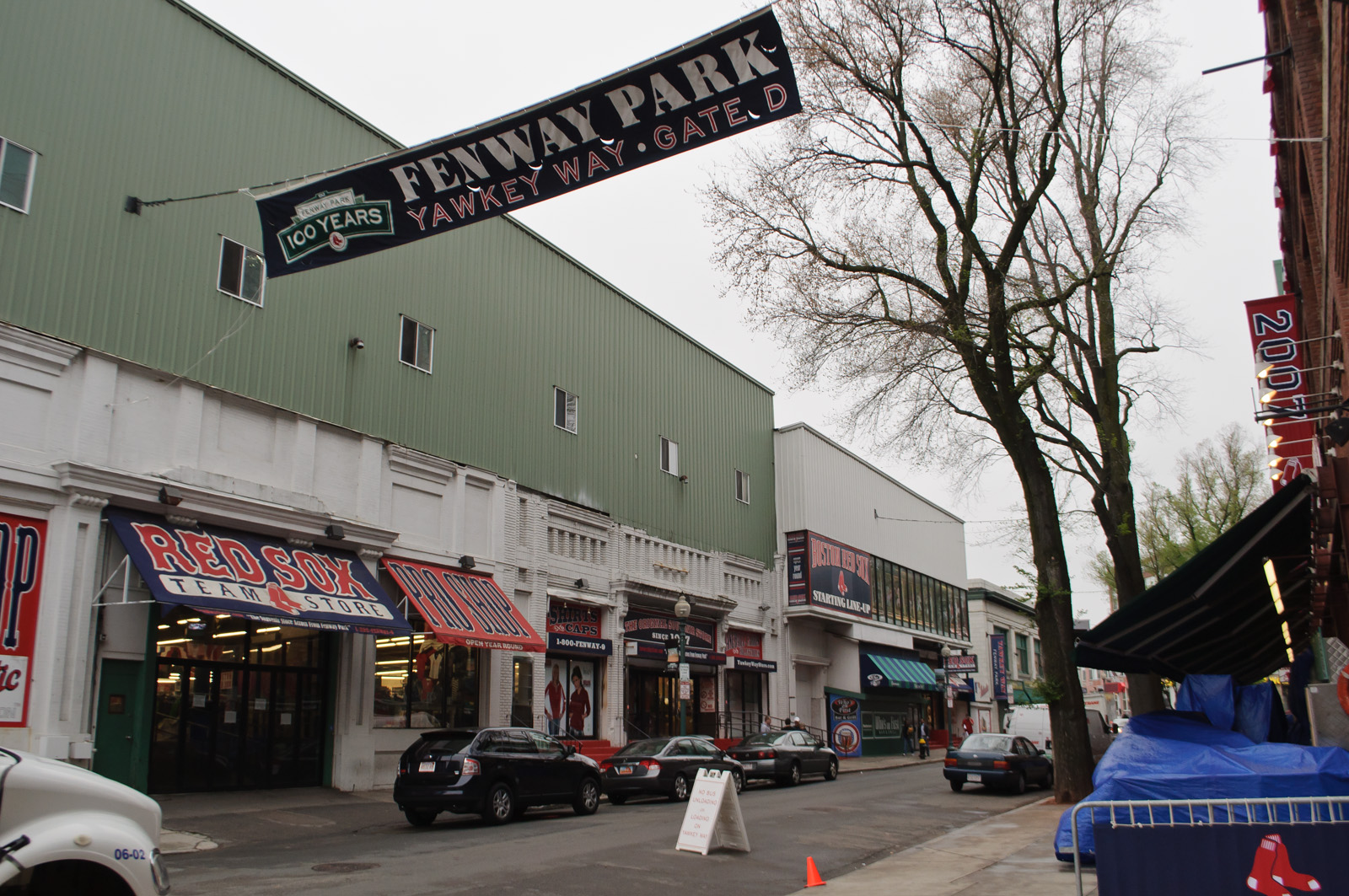
Red Sox Team Store in 2012

In 1965, the D'Angelo brothers purchased a 2,000-square-foot (190 m^{2}) retail space on Yawkey Way to sell Red Sox souvenirs. The company now owns and operates the Red Sox Team Store at 19 Jersey Street across from Fenway Park. On game days, the store is open to ticketed patrons two hours before game time, throughout the game, and 30 minutes after the end of the game. The store operates daily. The company headquarters is located in Westwood, Massachusetts. In addition, they have a 200,000-square-foot (19,000 m^{2}) warehouse in Brockton, Massachusetts.

Their business, originally called Twins Enterprise, changed its name in 2010 to '47 Brand. In 2015, they dropped "Brand" from the name, although the company is still occasionally referred to by its former names in various publications. In 2011, '47 opened its first brick and mortar store on Newbury Street in Boston. That store closed in 2020.

In 2012, '47 expanded into football fanwear with a line of official National Football League (NFL) headwear. In 2018, '47 partnered with Carhartt, a workwear brand, to create NFL headwear.

In 2014, '47 became an official licensed on-field partner for four teams in the Cape Cod Baseball League. In 2015, '47 expanded their portfolio with a United States Soccer Federation (USSF) and Major League Soccer (MLS) partnership deal. Also in 2015, the company acquired the rights to produce caps for Major League Baseball (MLB) on-field postseason celebrations and secured a license to create merchandise for Major League Baseball International (MLBI).

Further expansion across major sports included a partnership with Liverpool Football Club (Liverpool FC), in October 2015. At the time, Steven D'Angelo of '47 called the move "a natural next step for the brand, which has traditionally focused on U.S. sports leagues until now."

In 2016, the Georgia Bulldogs joined '47 in an exclusive headwear deal, and the same year, Cal State signed their own exclusive headwear deal. In 2020, '47 added the Ohio State Buckeyes to its licensing roster.

In 2017, '47 expanded its licensing arrangement with the National Basketball Association (NBA), with an agreement that covered then-current NBA team logos on adult apparel and men's, women's and youth headwear. The agreement also allowed '47 to create products for the NBA's key events in the season, including NBA All-Star, NBA Playoffs and NBA Finals.

Dominic Farrell joined '47 in 2021 as chief operating officer, a position he held for two years, before becoming president in 2023. He became the first non-family member to lead '47 in the company's history.

On June 23, 2023, '47 opened a pop-up store at 19 Air Street in London, coinciding with the June 2023 MLB London Series. John Gough, general manager of international for '47, called the pop-up "a bespoke store inspired by our rich American heritage."

In 2023, '47 added a partnership with NASCAR, the top U.S. motorsport. The agreement included offering a premium suite of products to the NASCAR fanbase. Farrell, president of '47, called the agreement a "perfect match" between the '47 heritage of creating best-in-class headwear and apparel and "the high expectations of the NASCAR fan."

In early June 2024, the president of '47 announced that they would be bought by New Era Cap Company. In early August 2024, New Era completed the acquisition.
