= 59Fifty =

Baseball cap model by New Era Cap Company

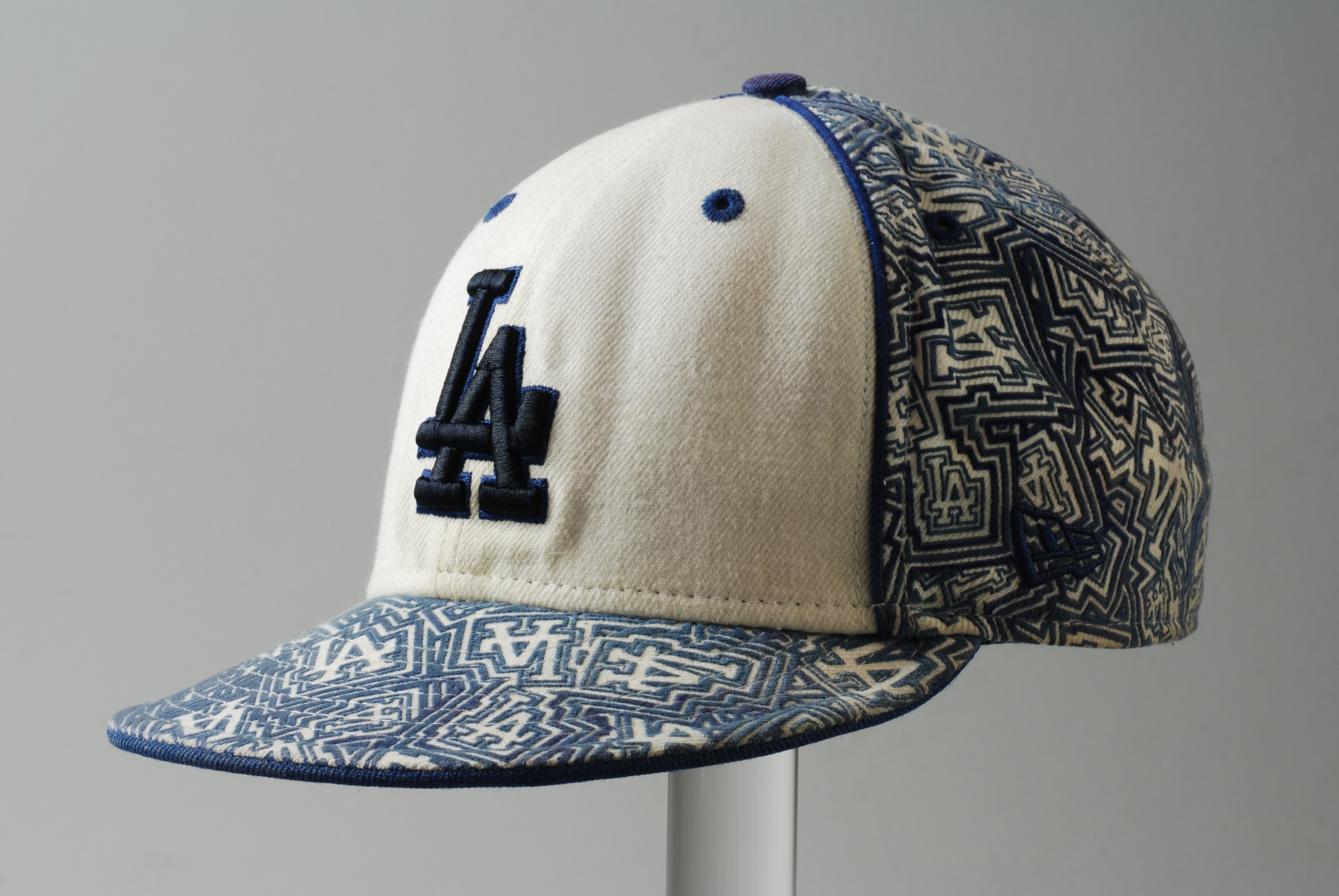
- A Los Angeles Dodgers 59Fifty cap
- Type: Baseball cap
- Inventor: Harold Koch
- Inception: 1954
- Manufacturer: New Era Cap Company
- Website: Official New Era website

The 5950 is a model of baseball hat made by the New Era Cap Company, a headwear company based in Buffalo, New York. The 59Fifty is the official on-field cap of Major League Baseball (MLB) and Minor League Baseball, and the official sideline cap of the National Football League and the National Basketball Association. It is also a fashion symbol, with the hip-hop community the first to adopt it in the 1980s and 1990s.

== History ==
The 59FIFTY's wool predecessor debuted in 1934 at a Cleveland Indians game and the 59FIFTY itself came out in 1954. Harold Koch, son of New Era founder Ehrhardt Koch, created the 59FIFTY to make hats more uniform within MLB. Sources vary on the meaning of its name: it might be the cap's original catalogue number, 5950; its model number; or the roll of fabric Koch used while producing the original design. By the 1970s, the 59FIFTY was being worn by 20 of the 24 MLB teams and became available to the public in 1980. The Cincinnati Reds became the first team to receive memorial caps following their 1990 World Series win. Hats from the losing team are taken apart and recycled following the game. The 59FIFTY became the official on-field cap in 1993.

=== Early popularity ===
During the 1980s, Tom Selleck popularized the 59FIFTY when he wore a Detroit Tigers cap in Magnum P.I.. Its first major craze came in 1996, when film director Spike Lee requested a custom red New York Yankees cap to wear to the third game of the World Series. New Era's contract with the team stipulated that only blue caps could be produced, but the owner worked with MLB to make an exception. Lee was photographed at the game and requests for custom orders increased substantially. Several years later, Fred Durst repopularized the red Yankees hat.

== Design and manufacture ==
The first 59FIFTY design had a flat visor, with eight rows of stitching, ventilating eyelet holes, and a high rise crown. Koch added a buckram on the inside of the cap to keep the logo centered and pointed forward. This design only underwent minor tweaks until the 1980s, when lighter wool, sweats, and beading were used to make the logos look cleaner, and the stitching was raised.

There are two styles of the 59FIFTY: the original, which has a flat visor and a tall profile; and the low-profile, which has a pre-curved visor and a rounded profile. Earlier versions of the 59FIFTY were made with 100% wool but eventually they were primarily constructed of the cheaper polyester, which is also said to allow for better sweat-wicking and sun protection. 59FIFTYs are fitted and do not have an adjustment strap at the back of the cap as seen in many other designs, such as the snapback baseball cap.

Teams could also choose different colored fabrics for the under-visor rather than the traditional green, which was used prior to that point "because it was believed the color helped the reflection of the sun off the turf, meaning there was less stress on a player’s eyes." It wasn't until 1990 that a team made this change, with the Cincinnati Reds changing their under-visor color to gray. The team wound up popularizing the gray under-visor because they won the World Series the same season they made the change. By 1995, all MLB teams were using gray fabric on their under-visors. Beginning in the late 1990s, teams began to experiment with black fabric under the visors to help with the sun's glare, and black sweatbands to make them appear less sweat-stained and by 2007, black under-visor fabric became the norm along with black sweatbands.

In 1992, the MLB logo was added to the back of every cap, and in 1996, the World Series logo was added to the right side of the hat. In 2016, the New Era flag logo was added to the bottom left side of the cap. Commemorative and special edition side patches appear on some caps and are also sold separately.

As of 2017, the caps were still being made partially by hand.

== Cultural impact ==
Collaborators on designs and graphics appearing on the 59FIFTY have included BTS, Fear of God, Takashi Murakami, Marc Jacobs, MTV, and Chance the Rapper.

New Era recognizes May 9 as 59FIFTY day.

=== Fashion ===
In the 1980s and 1990s, the hip-hop community began wearing the 59FIFTY as a fashion statement. Jay-Z, Eazy-E, Dr. Dre, Beastie Boys, and Aaliyah were among those who popularized it. New Era's CEO credits Spike Lee with bringing the 59FIFTY into the fashion world, which later fed into streetwear. Part of why the cap became a fashion icon is because it represented pride in one's city. The model is also sometimes called a Brooklyn style cap, due to New Era's connection to New York and to the borough's hip-hop scene.

Leaving the gold size sticker on the visor became a fashion trend, enough that New Era added that they do not offer replacement stickers to the FAQ on their website.

In 2017, Paola Antonelli included a replica of Spike Lee's red Yankees cap in her "Items: Is Fashion Modern?" exhibit at the Museum of Modern Art in New York. The exhibit featured 111 cultural icons that majorly impacted the world of fashion.
