= New Era Cap Company =

American headwear company

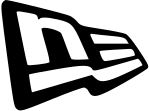
- Type: Private
- Industry: Headwear, apparel, accessories
- Founded: 1920 by Ehrhardt Koch in Buffalo, New York, U.S.
- Headquarters: Buffalo, New York, U.S.
- Key people: Ehrhardt Koch (Founder, 1920–1953); Harold Koch (President/CEO, 1953–1984); David Koch (President/CEO, 1982–2000); Chris Koch (CEO, 2001–present); Bruce Popko (President, 2016–present)
- Products: Headwear, baseball caps, apparel and accessories
- Brands: 59Fifty
- Revenue: $1 billion
- Operating income: $3.9 million
- Net income: $9.7 million
- Number of employees: 326 (Buffalo, New York); 1,200 (worldwide)
- Subsidiaries: '47
- Website: neweracap.com

The New Era Cap Company (commonly known simply as New Era) is an American headwear company headquartered in Buffalo, New York. It was founded in 1920 by Ehrhardt Koch. New Era has over 500 different licenses in its portfolio. Since 1993, it has been the exclusive baseball cap supplier for Major League Baseball (MLB).

== History ==
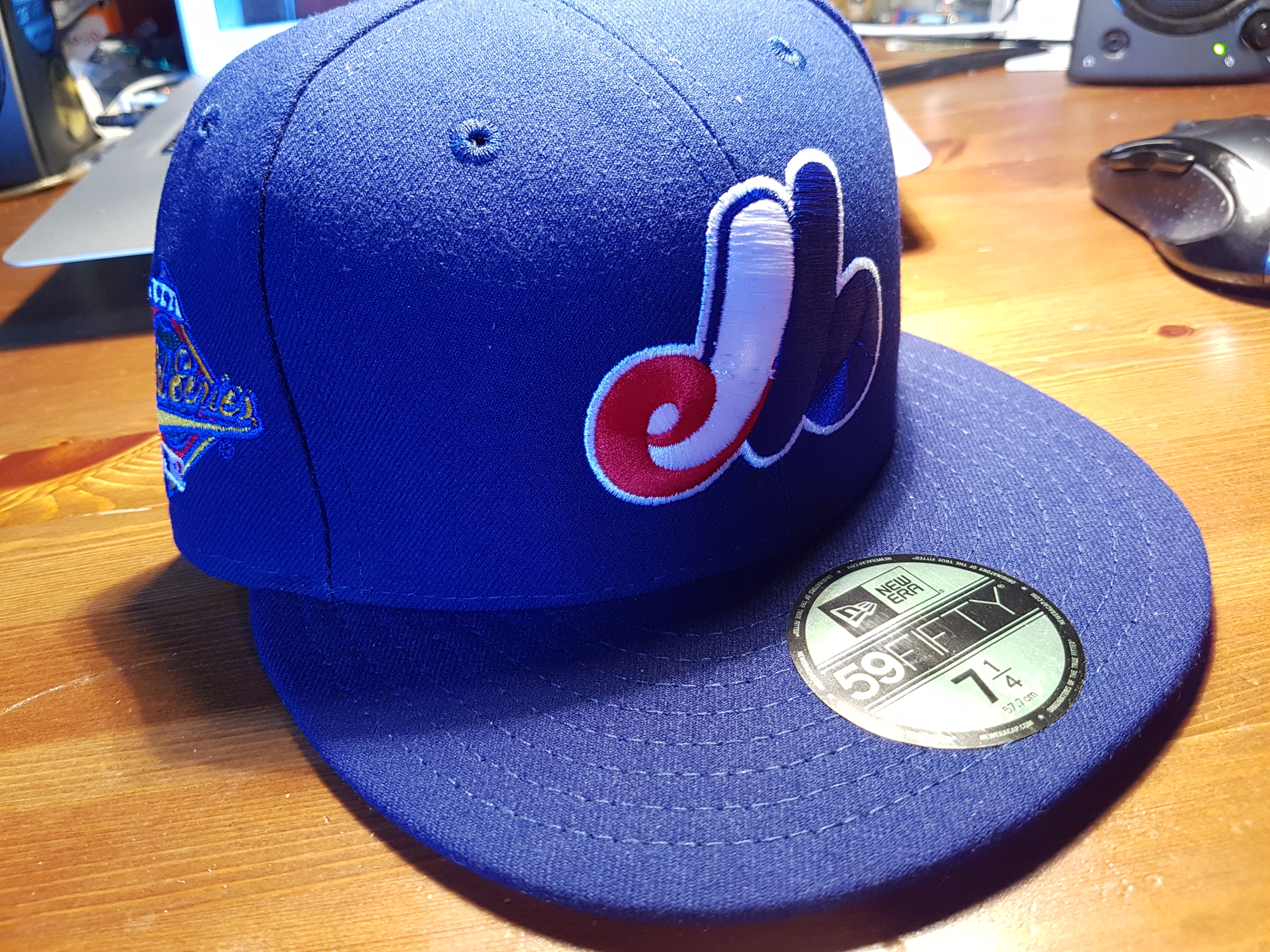
A 59Fifty cap

In 1920, Ehrhardt Koch borrowed $5,000 ($80,357 in 2025) from his aunt and started his own cap company, the E. Koch Cap Company. A year later he changed the name to New Era Cap. Production started on the third floor of 1830 Genesee Street in Buffalo, New York. The company started with 14 employees, including Ehrhardt's sister Rose and Joe Amerien, a colleague of Ehrhardt's from their previous employer, Miller Brothers. In 1920, the company produced 60,000 caps.

In 1934, New Era began producing caps for the Cleveland Indians, which became their first Major League Baseball (MLB) contract. In 1954, the company's fitted pro cap was modernized, redesigned, and named the 59Fifty, aka the "Brooklyn Style" cap, by Harold Koch, who introduced many design improvements and innovations while head of New Era. The business originally focused on making men's Gatsby caps, which were popular at the time. By 1965, New Era was supplying caps to about half of the then-20 MLB teams.

In 1993, New Era was granted the first exclusive license with the MLB to produce the on-field baseball caps for all of its (then 28, now 30) teams. In 2001, Chris Koch was named CEO. In the 2010s, while New Era had long been associated with baseball, the company focused on delving into football and other sports leagues. Starting in 2012, New Era acquired full exclusive sideline rights for the National Football League (NFL).

In 2013, New Era signed with Australian cricket's Big Bash League as their official cap provider. New Era signed an additional deal in 2015 with Manchester United. In 2016, New Era was named the official authentic headwear provider of the National Basketball Association (NBA), Women’s National Basketball Association (WNBA) and NBA G League (at the time known as the D-League).

In the summer of 2007, New Era voluntarily pulled three styles of New York Yankees hats from shelves across the country because the designs on the caps were seen to be gang-related. There were three caps that stood out: two with a bandanna-like pattern around the top and one with a gold crown. Brian Martinez, a New York Police Department (NYPD) detective involved with Peace on the Street, said, "Bandannas represent gang flags," "New Era is making it really convenient for gang members, because now your flag is part of your hat." The patterns on the hats were similar to the flags of the Crips, the Bloods, and the Latin Kings. Much of the New York public protested about the caps, and in response to these allegations, a New Era spokesperson stated that the company does not market to gangs, and when notified by activist groups and public officials, the company took immediate action.

It was announced on August 13, 2016, that New Era and the Buffalo Bills had reached an agreement for naming rights for Ralph Wilson Stadium. The Bills and New Era officially announced the stadium's new name of "New Era Field" five days later, on August 18, 2016. After the Bills released CEO Russ Brandon in May 2018, New Era hired Brandon in an executive position. A day later, New Era denied the hiring had taken place. The Athletic, which made the initial claim, continues to insist the hiring happened and that Brandon had been quietly fired after the story broke. The stadium sponsorship agreement was ended at New Era's request in 2020, and the stadium was renamed Bills Stadium.

On September 12, 2018, it was announced that New Era would be the official outfitter for the Canadian Football League (CFL) starting in the 2019 season. The company had been a licensee of the CFL for headwear and apparel since January 2011, and the deal marked the first time for the company to provide football uniforms and sideline apparel.

On April 22, 2021, it was announced that New Era would become a merchandise partner of the 2021 Rugby League World Cup. As of 2023, New Era made 59Fifty snapback versions of their popular hats, hats with logos from all major sports teams, as well as special-edition and custom-made hats. On July 9, 2024, New Era signed a deal to become the official hat of the National Hockey League (NHL). In August 2024, New Era acquired '47, a Massachusetts-based headwear company. In February 2026, New Era entered the sports apparel business by becoming the United Football League's Official Jersey & Headwear Partner and its eight teams. In April 2026, Bruce Popko was named president.

== Sponsorships and collaborations ==
In February 2026, New Era agreed to become the United Football League's Official Jersey & Headwear Partner and its eight teams.
