= City Connect =

Alternate uniforms in Major League Baseball

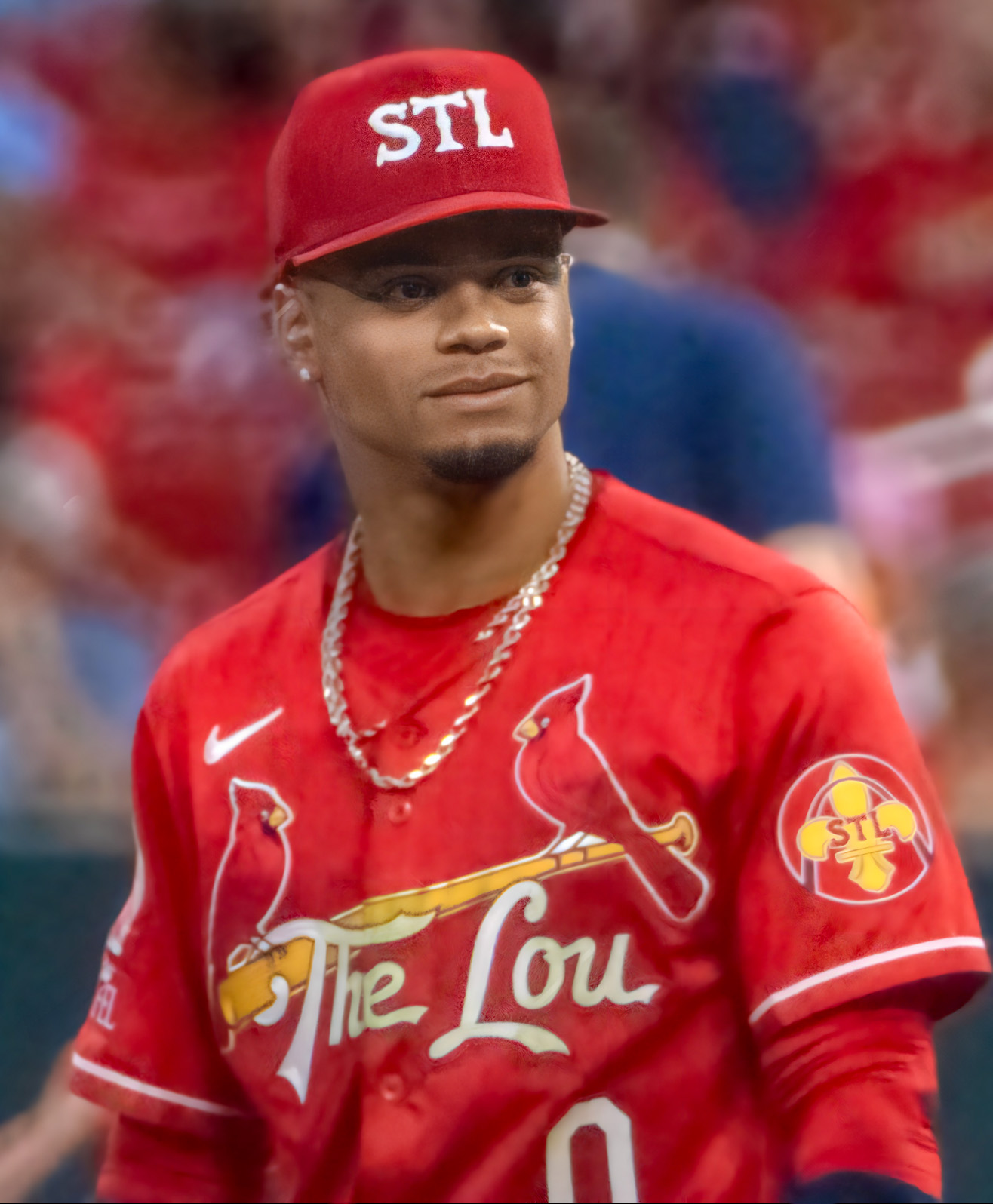
Masyn Winn wearing the City Connect jersey of the 2024 St. Louis Cardinals

City Connect is a brand name for a line of alternate uniforms made by Nike, Inc. for Major League Baseball (MLB) teams. The uniforms feature different color schemes, typefaces, and graphic elements compared with the teams' typical home and away uniforms. The uniforms are designed to reflect the cultural aspects of each team's home city. According to the agreement, teams may rotate in a new jersey after three years to debut a new look.

Of the MLB's 30 teams, 27 have a City Connect uniform. The New York Yankees (who traditionally do not wear an alternate uniform), the Athletics (who are not officially associated with any city during their planned relocation to Las Vegas), and the Chicago Cubs (whose Wrigleyville City Connect uniform was discontinued after the 2024 season and replaced with a “Chicago Blues” alternative uniform, which is not part of the City Connect Program). are the only three teams without a City Connect uniform.

While MLB has no rule restricting teams from wearing City Connect uniforms during postseason play, to date no team has worn their City Connect uniforms during any postseason round, including the World Series.

== Teams ==
Nike and MLB introduced the first round of City Connect uniforms during the 2021 season for seven teams, (Red Sox, Marlins, White Sox, Cubs, Diamondbacks, Giants, Dodgers). A second round debuted during the 2022 season for another seven teams (Nationals, Astros, Royals, Rockies, Angels, Brewers, Padres), a third during the 2023 season for six teams (Braves, Rangers, Mariners, Reds, Orioles, Pirates), and a fourth during the 2024 season for nine teams (Phillies, Mets, Rays, Tigers, Guardians, Cardinals, Blue Jays, Twins, Dodgers).

=== 2021 ===
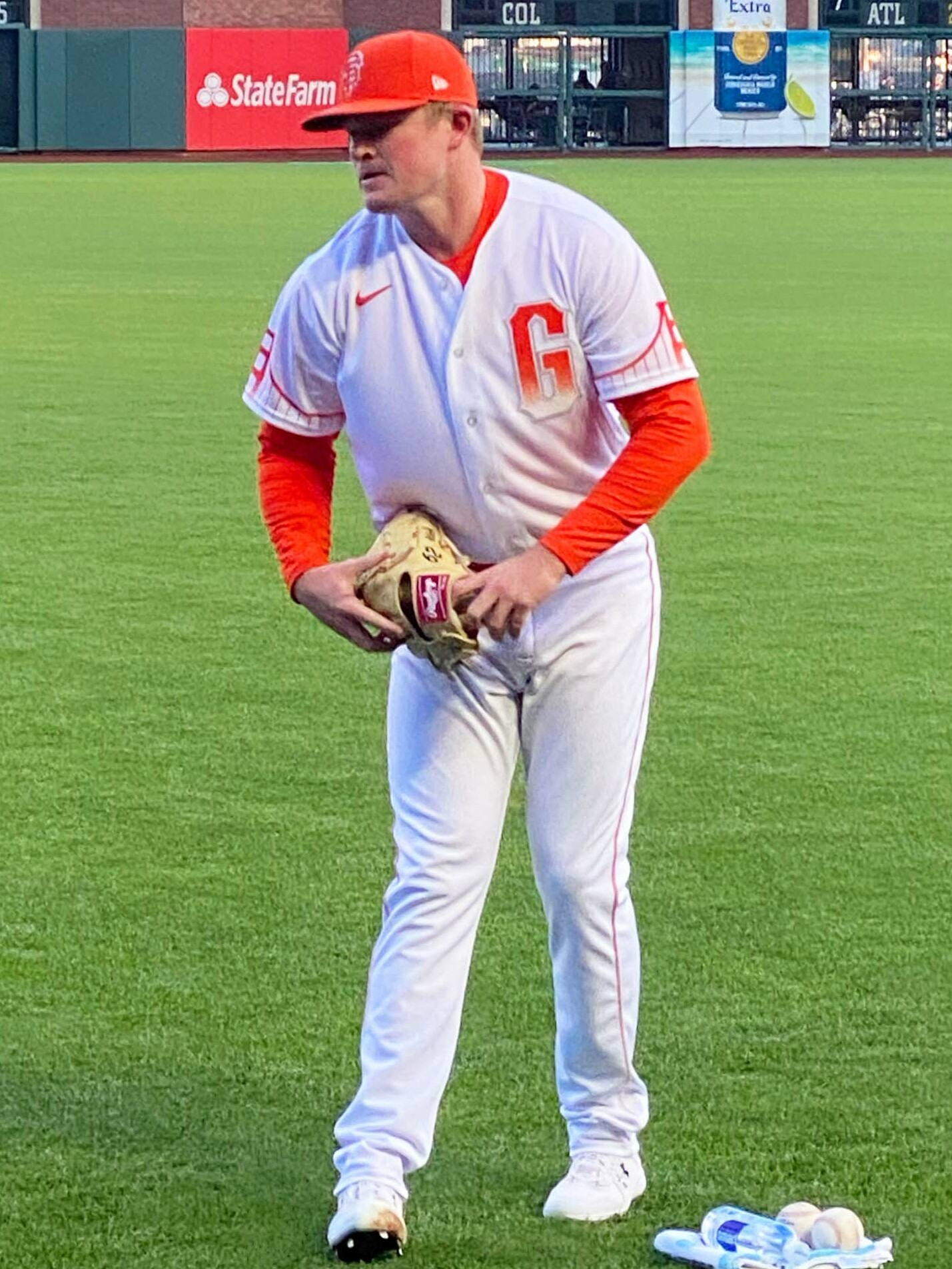
Logan Webb wearing the San Francisco Giants' City Connect uniforms before a game in 2021

Seven teams started wearing City Connect jerseys during the 2021 MLB season.

- Arizona Diamondbacks (first design), sand-colored with black letters and red numbers, and with "Serpientes" in front as an homage to Arizona's Hispanic community. The uniform was retired after the 2024 season and was replaced with a new City Connect uniform.
- Boston Red Sox (first design), with a yellow base and blue letters (tuff) as an homage to the Boston Marathon, which normally takes place on Patriots' Day. Starting in 2025, the yellow City Connect uniforms were added as a regular alternate uniform and a second City Connect uniform was introduced (see below).
- Chicago Cubs, dark blue with sky blue accents, with elements inspired by the flag of Chicago. The uniform has "Wrigleyville" on the front, in a lettering style similar to the Wrigley Field marquee.
- Chicago White Sox (first design), in a dark charcoal shade with white pinstripes and featuring Gothic-styled lettering as an homage to the South Side of Chicago. Alongside the Red Sox, in 2025, the “Southside” City Connect uniforms were added as a regular alternate uniform and were replaced with a new City Connect uniform (see below).
- Los Angeles Dodgers (first design), with a blue cap, jersey, and pants with “Los Dodgers” written on the cap and jersey. Jersey also includes black on the sleeves as a nod to street art culture in Los Angeles. Cap was revised in 2022, moving the "Los Dodgers" to the side, replacing it with the traditional "LA" logo, and adding black to the brim and button. In 2023, white pants with blue piping replaced the blue pants, before being replaced by a new City Connect jersey the following year (see below).
- Miami Marlins (first design), with a red base, white pinstripes, and white letters with light blue trim as a tribute to the Cuban Sugar Kings. The uniform was retired after the 2024 season and was replaced with a new City Connect uniform (see below).
- San Francisco Giants (first design), with an orange and white design, a silhouette of the Golden Gate Bridge, and a unique fog gradient across the front, sleeves, and numbering of the jerseys. The uniform was retired after the 2024 season and was replaced with a new City Connect uniform (see below).

=== 2022 ===
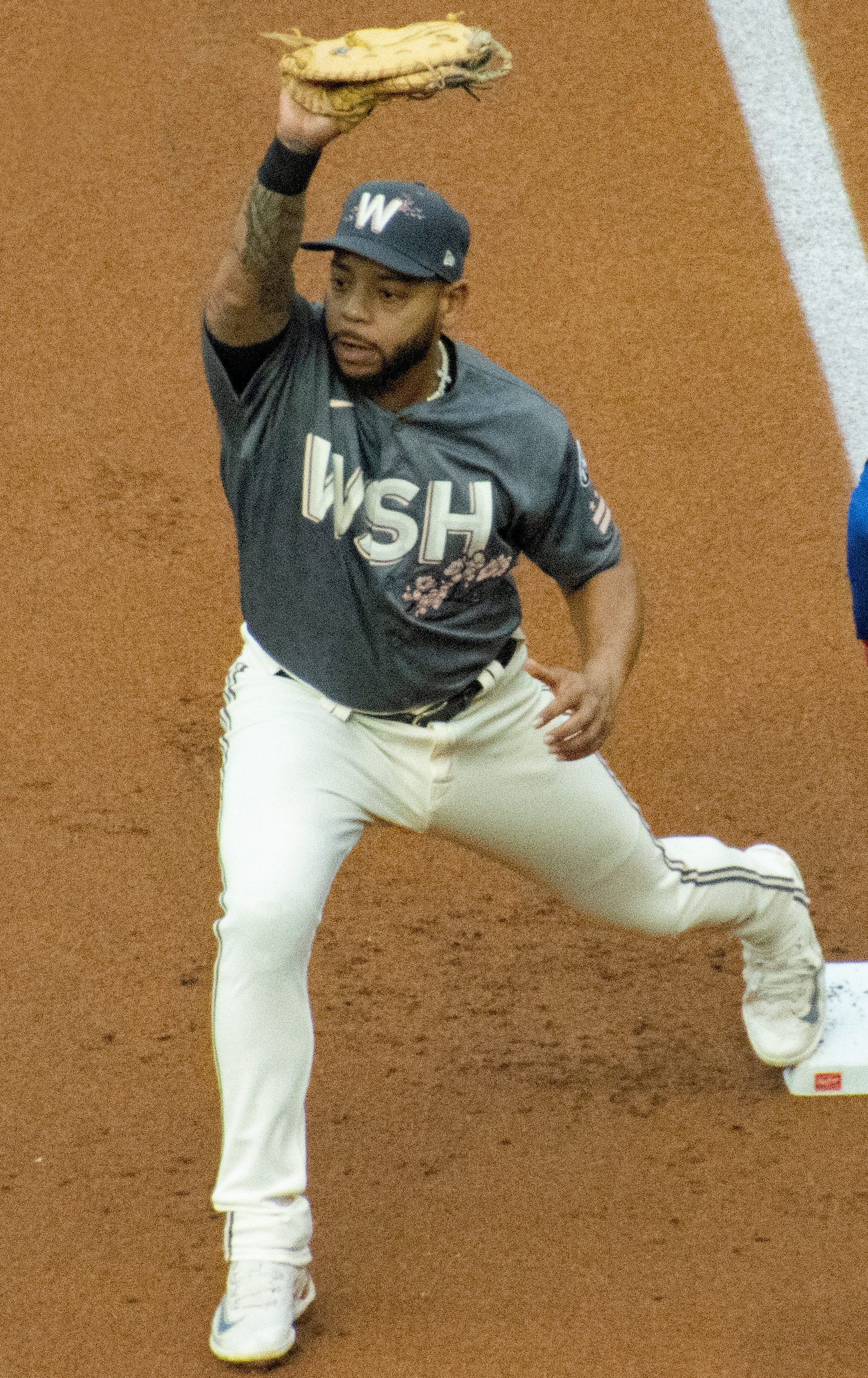
Dominic Smith wearing the Washington Nationals' City Connect uniforms during a game in 2023

The seven teams that introduced City Connect uniforms in 2021 would continue to wear them for selected games. Seven additional teams introduced City Connect uniforms in 2022.

- Colorado Rockies (first design), with a green base, purple accents, Colorado written on the front and a special logo on the cap resembling the state's license plates. In 2023, white pants were added as an alternative during day games, with the green pants being used for night games. The uniform was retired after the 2024 season and was replaced with a new City Connect uniform (see below).
- Houston Astros (first design), with a navy base, tequila sunrise accents (suggestive of its 70s and 80s rainbow uniforms), "Space City" stenciled in the NASA 'worm' font on the front, and a hat with a planet revolving around a futuristic version of the "H-star" logo, in honor of Houston being home to the Johnson Space Center. The uniform was retired after the 2024 season and was replaced with a new City Connect uniform (see below).
- Kansas City Royals, with a navy base and powder blue accents, and a stylized "KC" insignia in homage to Kansas City's "City of Fountains" nickname.
- Los Angeles Angels, with a sand base, red accents and "Angels" written on the front in honor of the beaches in Southern California.
- Milwaukee Brewers, with a powder blue base, navy accents, yellow and white striping, a grill and bratwurst patch, the team's "Brew Crew" nickname, and the MKE airport code with "414" blended in on the hat in honor of being in Milwaukee during the summer.
- San Diego Padres (first design), with a white base, pink and mint sleeves, and San Diego on the front in honor of the culture of both the city of San Diego and Tijuana. The uniform will be retired after the 2025 season and will be replaced with a new City Connect uniform (see below).
- Washington Nationals (first design), with an anthracite base, pink accents and printed cherry blossoms in honor of the annual National Cherry Blossom Festival. The uniform was retired after the 2024 season and was replaced with a new City Connect uniform (see below).

=== 2023 ===
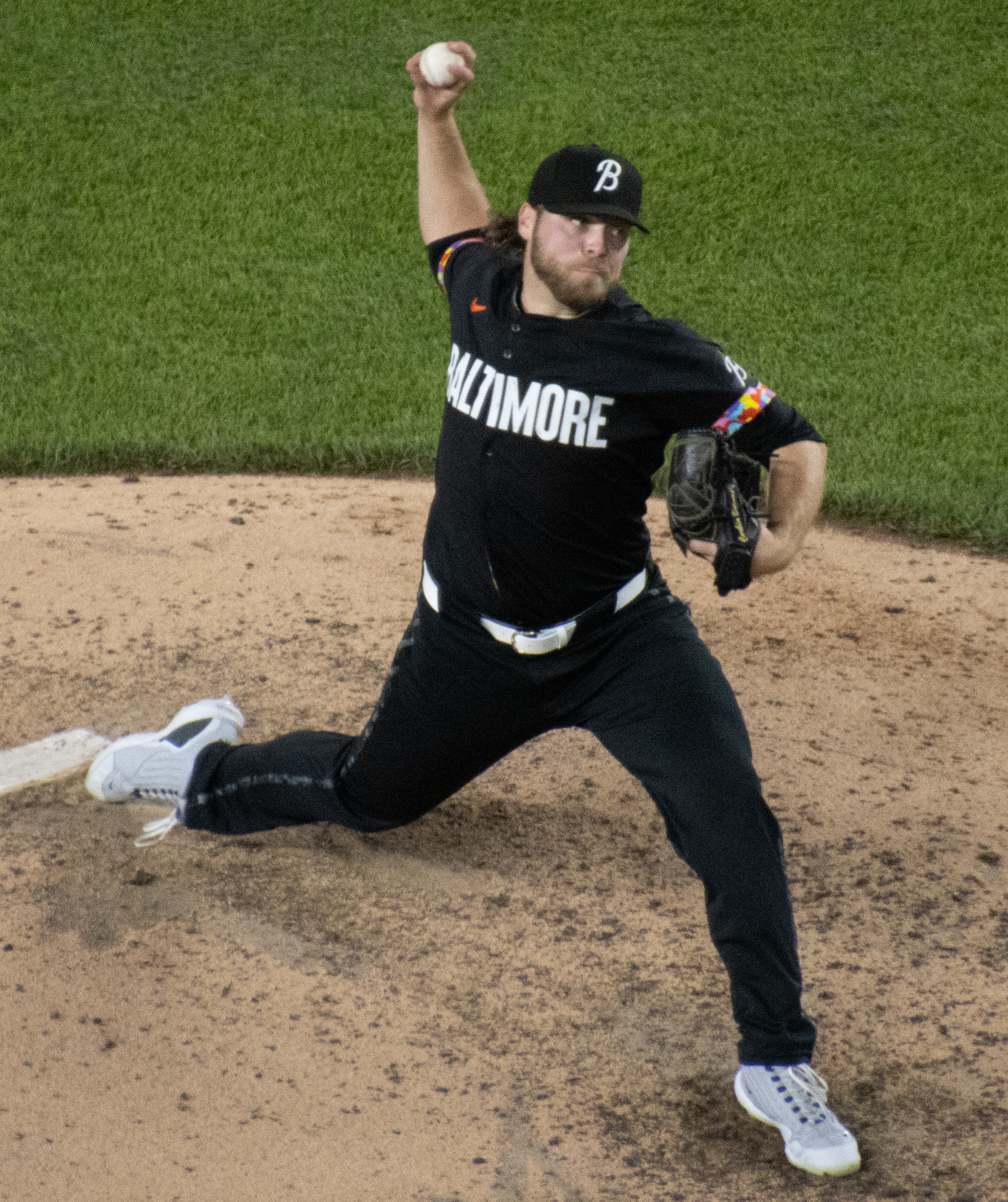
Corbin Burnes wearing the Baltimore Orioles' City Connect uniforms during a game in 2024

Six teams wore City Connect uniforms for the first time in 2023.

- Atlanta Braves, with a white base, royal blue sleeves, and crimson red accents, heavily inspired by the team's 1974 season home uniform worn by Hank Aaron when he surpassed Babe Ruth with his 715th home run.
- Baltimore Orioles, with a black base and white accents. The jersey is inspired by Baltimore and its neighborhoods. The cap features an italic B (commonly used on the Orioles Away Jersey). The jersey features the word “Baltimore” in capital letters and white lettering. On the collar and the piping, it features the colors and shapes of the neighborhoods of Baltimore. In 2024, the Orioles added white pants to their City Connect uniforms as an alternative to black pants.

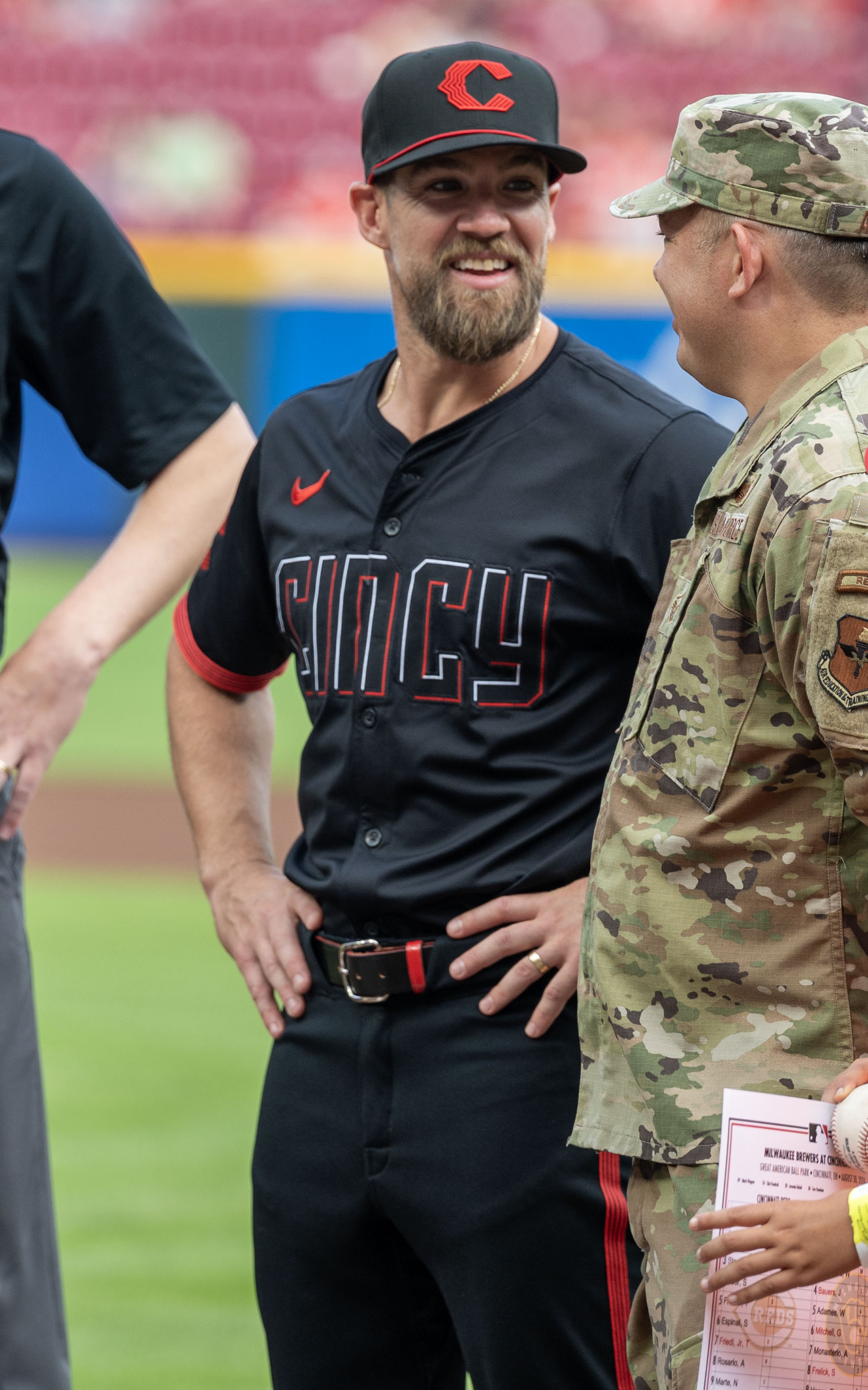
Collin Cowgill wearing the Cincinnati Reds' City Connect uniforms before a game in 2024

- Cincinnati Reds, with a black base and red accents. The jersey features a diamond shape "C" on the cap and jersey. It also features the word "CINCY" (nickname for Cincinnati) across the chest. On the collar it features an Ohio Buckeye and under it is the motto of Cincinnati, "Juncta Juvant" ("Strength of Unity" in English).
- Pittsburgh Pirates, with a gold base and black accents. The Jersey and Pants colors are similar to the flag of Pittsburgh. The jersey features the abbreviation of Pittsburgh, "PGH". The uniform also features a custom print with three elements: the inverted "Y", the asteroid, and the check. Inside of the "PGH" and the numbers on the back features a pattern located on the sides of the Three Sisters Bridges. In 2024, the City Connect uniforms were paired occasionally with the home white pants and the black "P" batting practice cap featuring Stargell Stars.
- Seattle Mariners, with a dark blue base with yellow lettering and black pants. It features a patch on the jersey sleeve featuring Mount Rainier, as well as the letters "PNW", an acronym for Pacific Northwest. The uniform also features the colors of Amarillo, Rush Blue, and Sundown, representing the inaugural colors of the team, as well as the word "Seattle" across the chest in the lettering style of the city's first Major League Baseball team, the Seattle Pilots.
- Texas Rangers, with a cream base, black lettering, pants, and cap, and red numbers. The jersey features the Texas abbreviation "TX" on the left side of the jersey; it is also featured in the cap, but in white lettering. The sleeve of the jersey features a Peagle, a mix between a panther and an eagle, representing the Fort Worth Panthers and Dallas Eagles, two former minor league teams that were based in the Dallas-Fort Worth Metroplex.

=== 2024 ===
Eight teams revealed their City Connect uniforms and wore them for the first time in 2024. The Los Angeles Dodgers also revealed their second City Connect uniform design during the season.

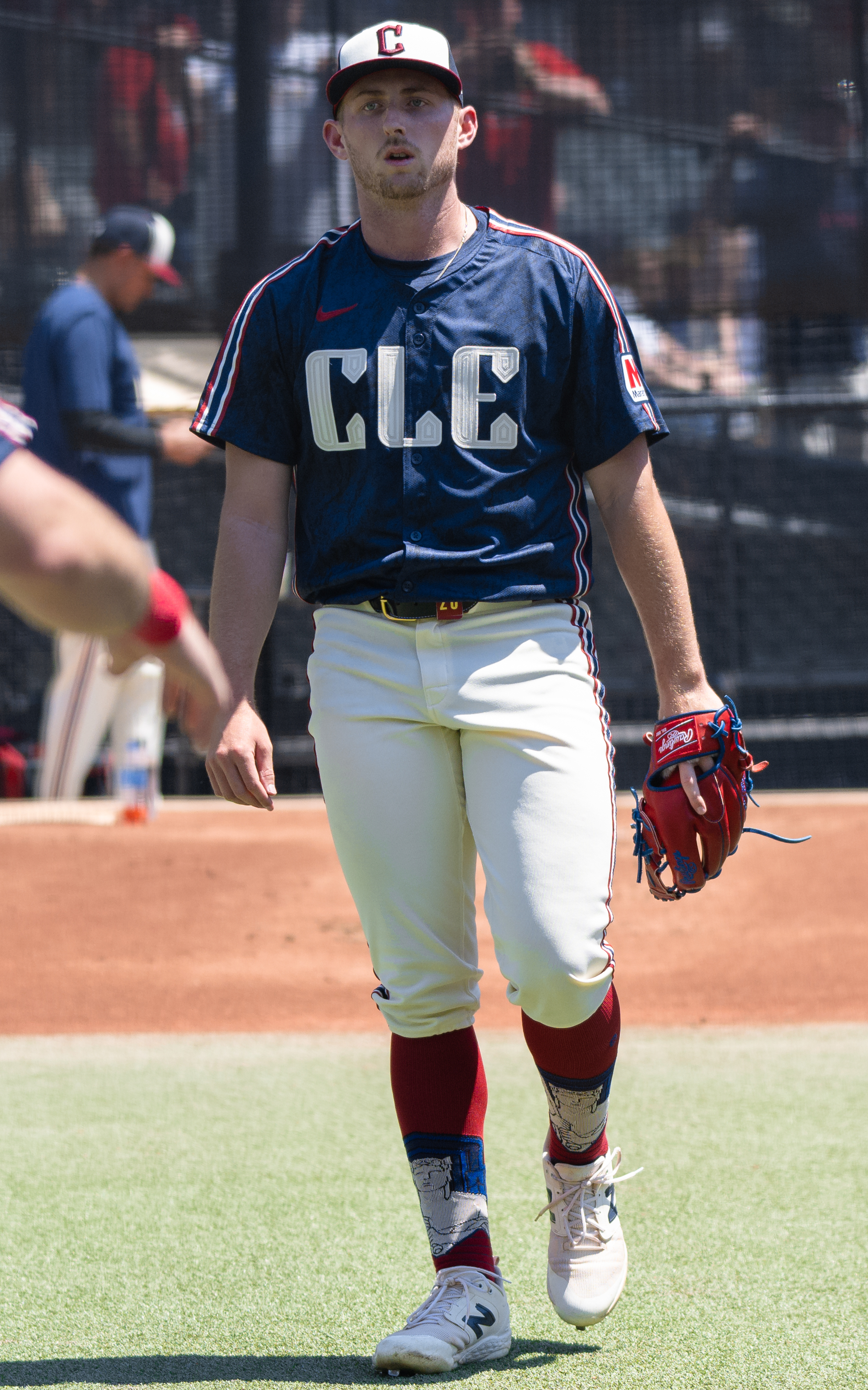
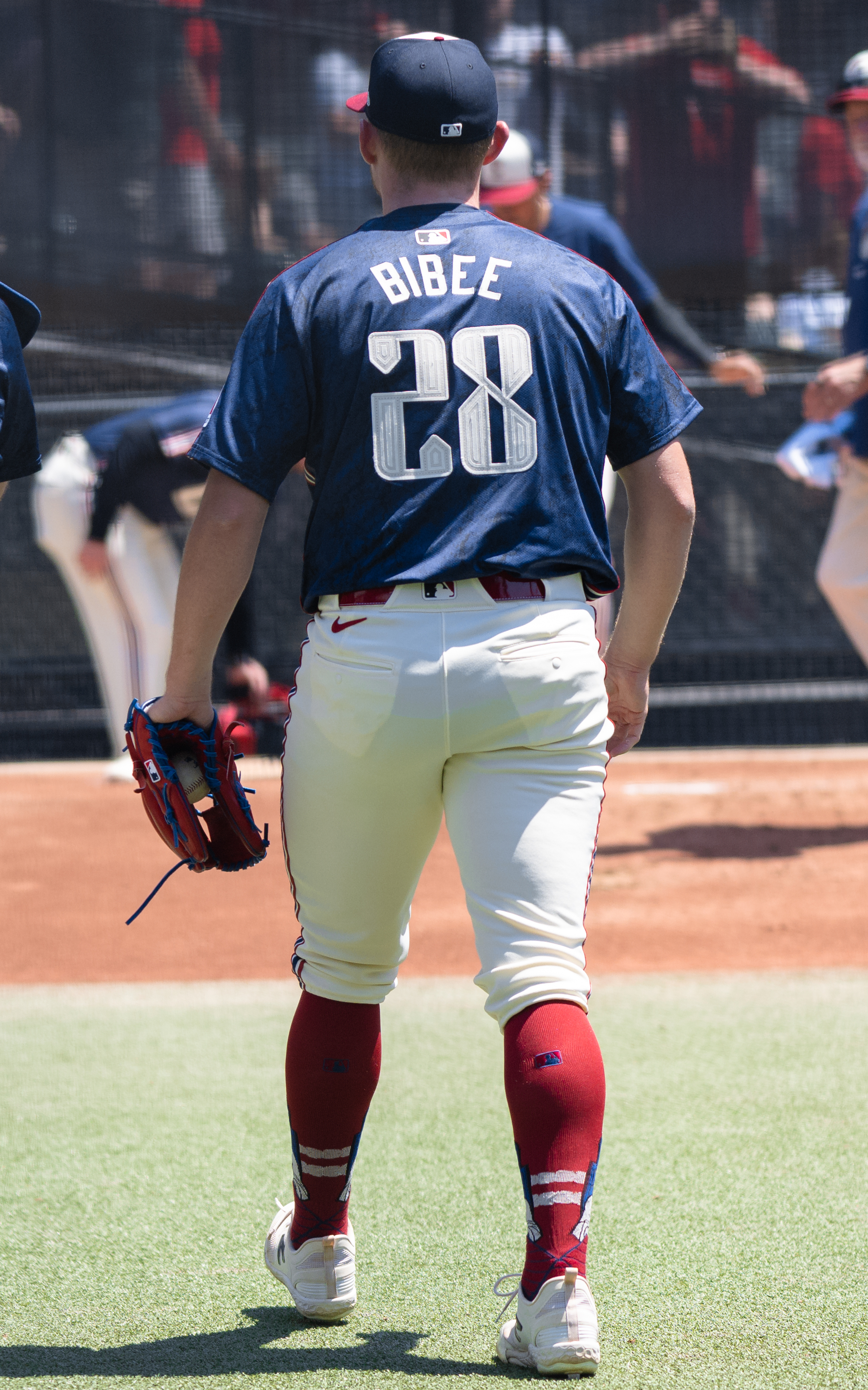
Tanner Bibee wearing the Cleveland Guardians' City Connect uniforms in 2024
- Cleveland Guardians, with a dark blue base, white lettering and pants, and red and white stripes. The jersey features Cleveland's abbreviation "CLE" across the chest and in white lettering. It also featured a red and white stripe pattern around the jersey, which pays tribute to the team's past uniforms from the 1980s. The cap features a dark blue diamond-shaped "C" along with white and dark blue colors. The uniform is to pay tribute to the Guardians of Traffic statues at the Hope Memorial Bridge, which connects to Progressive Field.
- Detroit Tigers, with a navy blue gradient base and white lettering. The jersey features Detroit's nickname "Motor City" across the chest in white lettering, while the cap, which is dark navy blue, features the city name across in white lettering. The uniform is to pay tribute to the automotive industry in Detroit.
- Los Angeles Dodgers (second design), with a cream base and blue lettering. The jersey features the city name in dusk and electric blue lettering. The sleeve features the "LA" interlocked along with the Dodgers scripted "D" combined in dusk blue. The cap is dusk blue and features combined "LA" interlocked and the Dodgers scripted "D" in cream lettering.
- Minnesota Twins, with a blue "ripple–effect" base and white lettering mentioning the states 10000 lakes. The jersey features Minnesota's abbreviation "MN" in whiter lettering, integrating with the North Star, the state's nickname. The cap is also blue and features the outline of the state of Minnesota where the inside features the Northern Lights reflected in the water line of the lake. In 2025, the blue pants were replaced with white pants with blue and yellow piping.

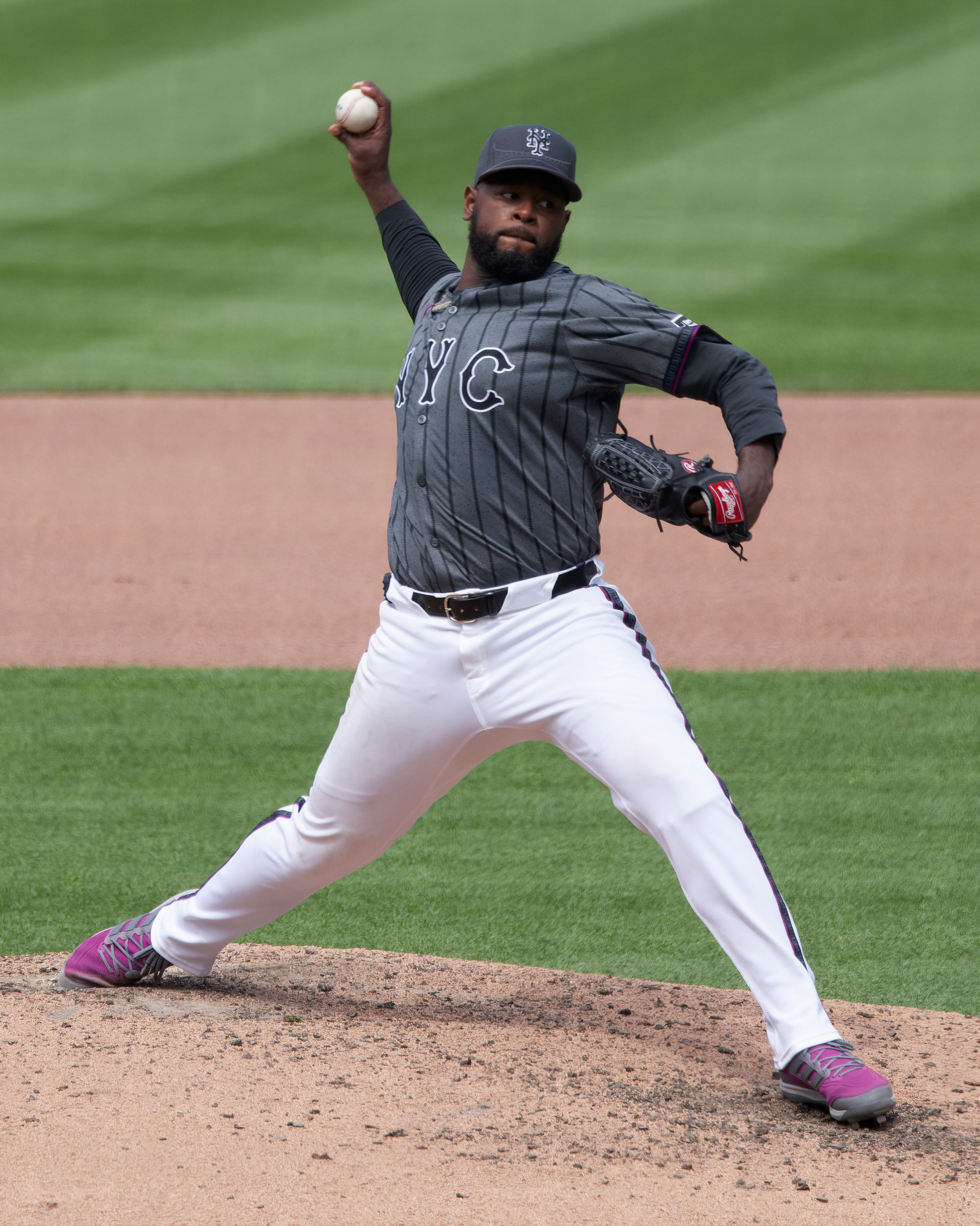
Luis Severino wearing the New York Mets' City Connect uniforms in 2024

- New York Mets, with a gray base, purple pinstripes and lettering, and white pants. The jersey features New York City's abbreviation "NYC" across the chest. The cap features the Mets' NY logo along with the Queensboro Bridge, which connects the boroughs of Manhattan and Queens. The purple color was inspired by the 7 subway line that runs to Citi Field.

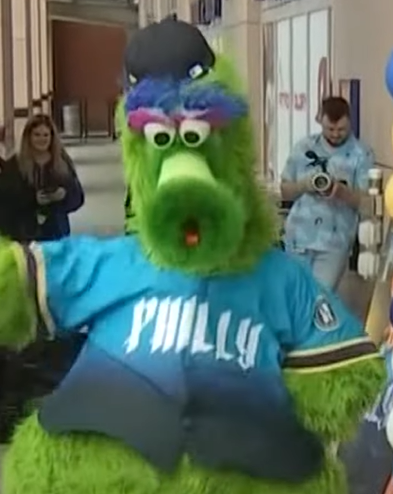
The Phillie Phanatic modeling the Philadelphia Phillies' City Connect jersey during the uniform's unveiling in 2024

- Philadelphia Phillies, a blue to black gradient base, with white and yellow accents. The uniform's colors are based on the Flag of Philadelphia. The jersey features Philadelphia's shortened name "PHILLY" across the chest in white lettering. The cap features the Liberty Bell, with the skyline of Philadelphia inside and two stars on each side.

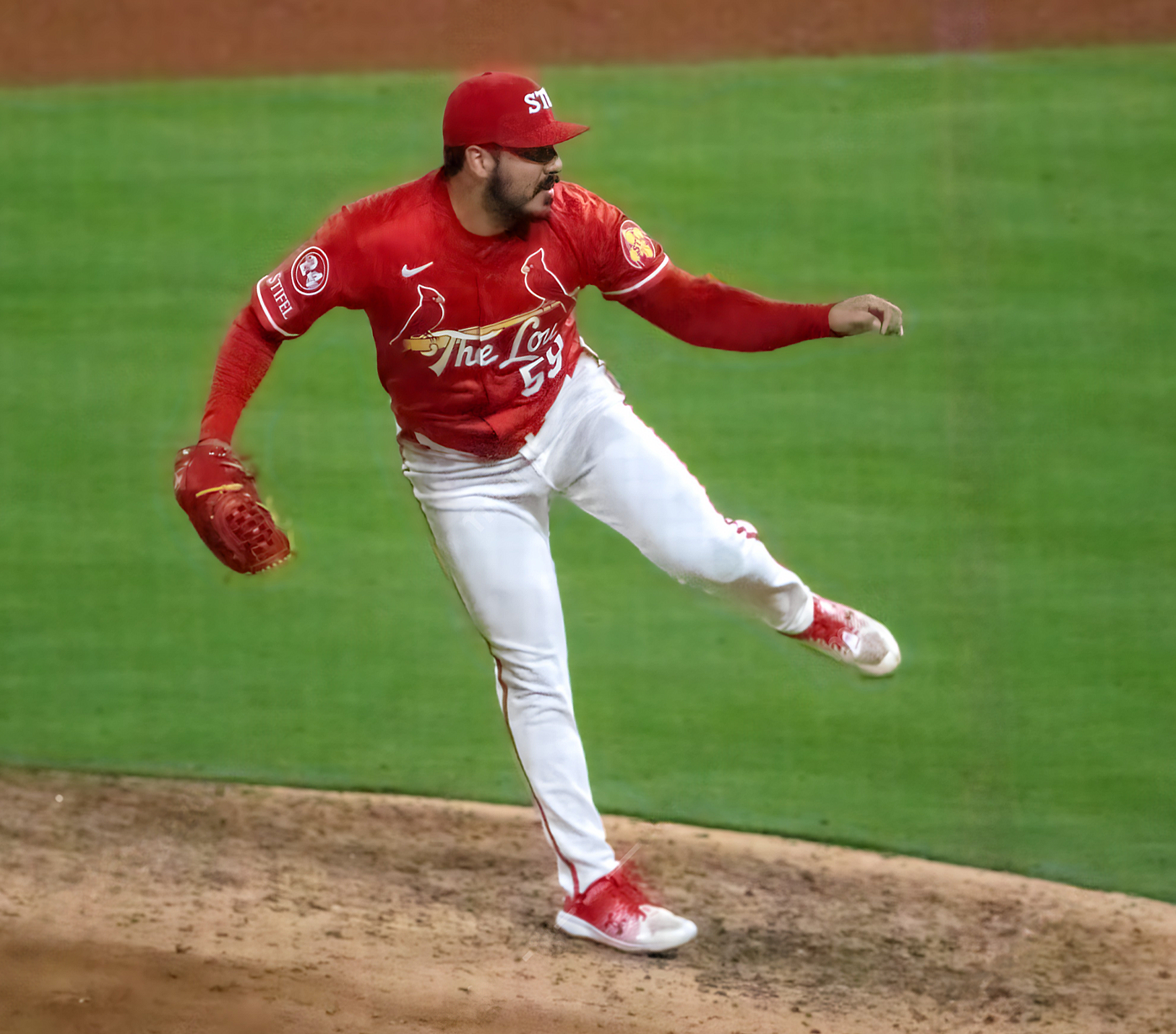
JoJo Romero wearing the St. Louis Cardinals' City Connect uniforms in 2024

- St. Louis Cardinals, with a red base and white pants. The jersey features St. Louis' nickname, "The Lou" in cursive lettering along with the "birds on the bat" logo, which is similar to other uniforms. It also features river lining to symbolize the Mississippi River, which is next to St. Louis. The cap is red and features St. Louis' abbreviation "STL" across and in white lettering, which features the font from their 1920 uniforms.

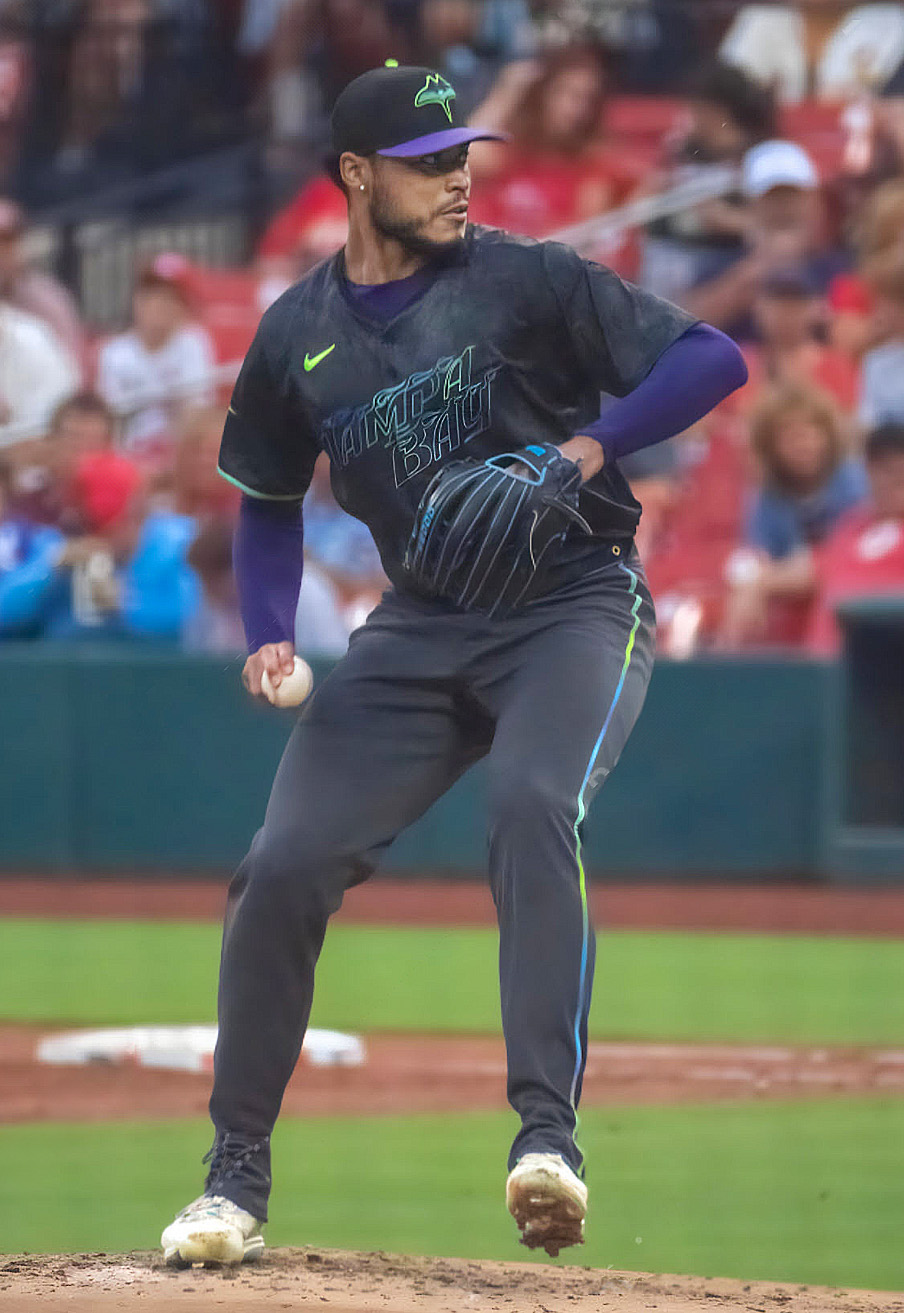
Taj Bradley wearing the Tampa Bay Rays' City Connect uniforms in 2024

- Tampa Bay Rays, with a "grit" black base and neon lettering. The jersey flaunts the city name for the first time since 2007, outlined in neon across the chest, which features lettering similar to the Devil Rays road jerseys from 1998 to 2000. The cap features the Sunshine Skyway Bridge, which crosses into St. Petersburg along with the sting-ray, also called "skyray". Another logo features three palm trees and a pelican, with several ties to the area. The three palms logo can be seen on a Florida Historical Marker, such as the one located at Perry Harvey Sr. Park, also known as the "Bro Bowl", Florida’s first public skatepark, and the first to be listed on any national registry of historic sites. The pelican is featured on the flag of St. Petersburg and is a nod to the St. Petersburg Pelicans, who played in the Florida State Negro Baseball League in the 1940s and ‘50s.
- Toronto Blue Jays, have a midnight black base with "Canada Flag" red and "Jay" blue accents. The jersey features the city name across the chest in red, outlined in black, over a blue silhouette of Toronto's city skyline. The cap features a "split T" logo in red and blue along with a maple leaf, which is from the Flag of Toronto.

=== 2025 ===
The 2025 season saw eight teams debut a second City Connect design:

- Arizona Diamondbacks (second design) revealed a new City Connect uniform on May 5, 2025, with a purple base and teal lettering. The uniforms take designs from all their different uniform combinations since they became a franchise in 1998. The jersey pays tribute to the original jersey with the Heritage Pinstripes worn from 1998−2006 as well as its “evolutionary jersey” from 2016−19 by blending pinstripes with a snakeskin pattern. The jersey still features the word "Serpientes" with the S remaining the same from their previous version of their city connect, with the rest being a new design. The faux sleeves pay tribute to the 2001 World Series-winning team, which featured sleeveless jerseys that had a different colored sleeve. The Sleeves also feature the Flag of Arizona on one sleeve, the State outline with a baseball silhouette and the year 1998, the founding year of the club, plus features a light color of teal in the shape of 48, as Arizona is the 48th State in the Union. The trim on the sleeve is in teal and was used on the team uniform from 1998−2006, which is in the shape of a Diamondback Rattlesnake skin. The collar features the phrase "Arizona Born", pays tribute to the legacy of Arizona, rooted in the State of Arizona. The cap is in the original purple and has a teal brim that features the "S" serpientes logo.
- Boston Red Sox (second design) revealed a new City Connect uniform on May 16, 2025, with a Green base, white lettering, and yellow numbers. The uniforms called "Fenway Greens" represent the colors and look of the iconic Green Monster. The font of the uniform is the same as the numbers and letters on the Green Monster. Inside the collar of the jersey features the year "1912" which is the year Fenway Park opened, and also features the same grey color as the concrete used to construct the Green Monster. The yellow number on the uniform represents the same color used for the score during the current inning. The jersey also features a blue and red dot, which matches the colors of balls, strikes, and outs. The jersey has a patch with the letter "B" inside a green and white circle, which represents the city of Boston and also represents when a team gets a hit or an error on the most recent play. The hat is also the same green color as the Green Monster, features the normal "B" font in a grey color that matches the concrete. Their original yellow City Connect uniform will remain in the regular rotation, replacing the team's blue road alternate.
- Chicago White Sox (second design) revealed a new City Connect uniform on April 28, 2025, in collaboration with the NBA's Chicago Bulls. (Both teams are owned by Jerry Reinsdorf.) The new jersey is red with black pinstripes and features a black "CHICAGO" wordmark trimmed in white, inspired by the Bulls' "Statement" uniform. Both sleeves are black with a red and white winged-sock patch, a new logo based on the White Sox’s 1950s design. A thick red stripe with “SOUTHSIDE” repeatedly printed in black wraps around the sleeve cuffs, paying homage to the previous City Connect set. The player’s number appears in black with a white outline below the chest wordmark on the front, while the player’s name arches in white over a large black number on the back. Two cap options are available—one red with black pinstripes and a black visor, the other black with a red visor—both featuring four white stars on the eyelets and the nine combined championships of the White Sox and Bulls printed inside the back collar. Their original “Southside” City Connect uniform will remain in the regular rotation.
- Colorado Rockies (second design) revealed a new City Connect uniform on April 12, 2025, with a split between light blue and purple, paying homage to the transition between day and night over the Rocky Mountains. The jersey features bluebird skies and purple mountain majesty as the inspirations behind the color palette. Accents all over the uniform, cap, and branding use the red, yellow, and blue of the Colorado state flag. The Denver city flag is also featured on the lining inside the hat. It is the first pullover City Connect jersey by any team across MLB.
- Houston Astros (second design) revealed a new City Connect uniform on March 19, 2025, with a white base and blue lettering. The jersey features the team nickname "STROS" in blue lettering with an orange star logo, trim carrying over from their City Connect 1.0 with their "tequila sunrise" pattern, and a lunar pattern pinstriping on the pants paying tribute to the history of the moon landing. They also debuted a new hat logo, which is a futuristic design of their traditional star logo in the form of the Astros' "A". The sleeve features a mission patch inspired by the long-time Union Station logo. The belt loop has "HTX" stitched along the beltline to pay tribute to Houston, Texas. The afterburner socks feature a mixture of orange and yellow in the design of a fire, which symbolizes the afterburners on a rocket ship.
- Miami Marlins (second design) revealed a new City Connect uniform on April 30, 2025, with a black base, with teal and pink lettering. The jersey features "MIAMI" in teal, which represents the past with their inaugural season in 1993, using the same color and outline in pink, which represents the city's electric glow skyline. The jersey will also feature horizontal pinstripes in both teal and pink colors with white pants that have "Retrowave" piping down the sides. The cap features Miami's area code "305" with the original Marlin logo over the top of the city area code. This marks the first time in MLB history that a team will feature a hat that uses a city's area code. The brim is two-toned to represent the "Retrowave" theme, going from teal to pink. The team will have two sleeve patches, one sleeve will feature an "ADT" patch, which is a pillar sponsor of the Marlins and continue to use the "Retrowave" theme and the other will feature a patch with the original Marlin logo with the new Miami M logo. Finally, the jersey has a jock tag of the entire state of Florida with MIA on the side, which will represent the Sunshine State.
- San Francisco Giants (second design) revealed a new City Connect uniform on April 8, 2025. The design is inspired by San Francisco's music culture and "spirit of rebellion", and the counterculture of the 1960s. They have a black base with a "groove" pattern inspired by vinyl records, and the "Giants" script, numbers, and "SF" cap insignia are drawn in a psychedelic style inspired by concert posters of the era. The sleeve features a similarly-styled patch of Oracle Park's glove sculpture, with lettering reading "San Francisco Giants Est. 1958" (with "1958" written on a baseball in the center). The script, numbers, insignias, and the cap's visor feature an orange and purple tie-dye pattern, while the pants are white with a purple and orange gradient stripe on their sides. Parts of the uniform feature "Music Tiles" inspired by genres common in San Francisco's music scene (hip-hop, blues, hyphy, rock, country, electronic, pop, Latin, and jazz)
- Washington Nationals (second design), revealed a new City Connect uniform on March 23, 2025, with a light blue featuring a white outline of Washington, D.C.'s street grid and an interlocking "DC" on the chest which is meant to resemble the block "W" worn by the 1956 Washington Senators. The cap and shoulder patch features the block "W" with an outline of the United States Capitol dome, as well as two cherry blossoms.

Additionally, the Chicago Cubs introduced a new alternate uniform to replace their City Connect design introduced in 2021, which neither the team nor Nike considers part of the City Connect uniform program.

=== 2026 ===
- Atlanta Braves (second design) revealed a new City Connect uniform on March 31, 2026; the uniform is a throwback design inspired by the 1980s when the team began playing games on TBS Superstation, with a powder blue base and white and red lettering. The jersey will use a V-neck to maximize comfort, has "Atlanta" written in script across its chest and numbers in a dark shade of blue, while the cap includes a lowercase Cooperstown "a" with a similar style. The jersey and pants both feature red and blue piping on their sleeves and sides respectively, inspired by the team's 1980s uniforms. The sleeves feature an "ATL" insignia modeled after the former logo of TBS, as an homage to the team's former broadcasts on the channel.
- Baltimore Orioles (second design) revealed a new City Connect uniform on April 9, 2026; the uniform pays tribute to Camden Yards due to the popularity of the park, which is considered the ballpark that changed how modern baseball stadiums were developed. The jersey is a cream-colored base, which features "BMORE" across its chest in a dark green that matches the color of their outfield wall and orange outlines. It also features an Oriole bird perched on top of the "R", which marks a return of the Oriole logo to their uniform set. It has a homerun patch on the left sleeve which pays tribute to Eutaw Street that runs parallel to the iconic warehouse behind the ball park and that has the saying "From The Stoop to The Yard" along with the distance to home plate "410", as well as an area code for Maryland. Any player who hits a home run to Eutaw Street receives a brass plaque that includes the player's name, date of the home run, and distance. The right sleeve features a patch in dark green and orange, which has the Baltimore-based company and team sponsor T. Rowe Price. The trim of the uniform is in Orioles orange, is designed with brick paying tribute to the warehouse on Eutaw Street and has a jocktag on the bottom of the jersey which features a 19th century clock that reads "CHARM CITY" and "BAL", which has been a part of the ballpark above the centerfield scoreboard since the park opened April 6, 1992. The hats and batting helmets use the same colors as the uniform, which has an orange "B", which is inspired by the Baltimore Baseball Club of the 1890's.
- Cincinnati Reds (second design) became the first MLB team to have their second City Connect uniform be a progression of their first, which mixes in previous elements from the first design but updated features for the second. The entire uniform is Red, but it features five different shades of Red and continues to use the modern "C" logo, but in white with black accents, which is located on the chest and cap. For the first time since 2006, the entire Reds uniform will feature pinstripes in a dark red, the sleeves will be a third shade of red, but will not feature the pinstripes to pay tribute to the vest-style uniforms worn from 1993–2006. The hat has the fourth shade in which the bill of the hat is a darker shade of red, different from the body of the uniform, but has the updated "C" logo. The right sleeve has a patch in black and a fifth shade of Red that says "CINCY", which also has a graphic that resembles the Tyler Davidson Fountain on Fountain Square, which is located in Downtown Cincinnati. The Reds will also be the first MLB team to use both versions of their city connect uniforms and will alternate wearing the different versions on Friday and Saturday home games throughout the season.
- Kansas City Royals (second design) retired their "City of Fountains" uniform following the 2025 season and got a second updated version for the 2026 season. The Royals opted to use old designs with an updated modern twist that has an all white uniform with a color gradient starting with fuchsia into the typical Royal Blue, which is a nod to the number of fountains throughout all of Kansas City. The team has nicknamed them the "Forever Fountain" uniform that celebrates the city's nickname, "City of Fountains". The jersey features a "R" logo on the left chest that starts in Royal Blue at the bottom and blends into fuchsia at the top, which is similar to the logo from the original 1969 team logo with a crown on top of the "R". The hat also features the same crown logo as the jersey logo and uses the same color blend from Royal Blue on the brim to fuchsia on the top of the hat. The jersey numbers are the same font as the official logo of Kansas City, along with a white line around two vertical stripes on the armbands of the jersey, symbolizing the team's unique position along the state lines between Missouri and Kansas. At the bottom of the right sleeve is a heart, which reflects the team being in the middle of the nation's heartland. Inside the collar of the jersey is the phrase "HEY HEY HEY HEY", which was a song covered by The Beatles called "Kansas City' in 1964 at Municipal Stadium and now plays after everyone Royals win at Kauffman Stadium.
- Milwaukee Brewers (second design) debuted a new City Connect but became the first MLB team to honor the entire state of Wisconsin versus just the city of Milwaukee, with the team nicknaming them the State Connect. The jersey has a blue base that is inspired by the number of lakes, rivers and shoreline that stretches from Milwaukee River to Eagle River to Lake Mendota but also features "WISCO" across the front in script letter in partial accents of blue, cream which is the color of the sandy shores along the shoreline and sunset orange resembling the summer sunsets in the state of Wisconsin. The script lettering is a blend of script that has influence from the early 20th century American Association Milwaukee Brewers, classic supper clubs, and vintage Wisconsin brewery labels. The jersey has trim in the design of Wheat and Barley braids that pays tribute to Wisconsin's agricultural roots and brewing industries across that State that is also the inspiration for the team name. The left sleeve features a patch of the old Barrelman logo in front of an outline of the State of Wisconsin, using the same color outlines throughout the uniform. Inside the collar of the jersey is the inscription "Forward" which is the State motto for Wisconsin, which means to honor the past while continuing to progress forward. The bottom of the jersey features a jocktag in the shape of a fishing bobber with a baseball design resting on top of a Wisconsin lake, celebrating one of the favorite state pastimes. The hat uses the same coloring and script with a "W" in front of the Wisconsin State border.
- Pittsburgh Pirates (second design) opted to go back to a black uniform for the second design, which has "PIRATES" across in Gold lettering with each letter cutting off at the bottom to look like a Pirate sword and in a front that is to resemble a rugged Pirate style. The numbers and name on the back of the jersey feature the same style of font and color. The font of the uniform also resembles the design of the "Sister Bridges", including the famous Roberto Clemente Bridge, which connects PNC Park with Downtown Pittsburgh. The right sleeve features a patch that is similar to the logo, which was debuted in 1997, that has a Pirate logo with a red banana & black eyepatch, with the inscription "PGH", the city's abbreviation, and "1887", the year the club was founded. The uniform also has accents of red that pay tribute to the red Pirate banana design on the Jolly Roger.
- San Diego Padres (second design), announced via social media that they would be retiring their "Pink & Mint" uniform following the 2025 season. On November 2, 2025, to coincide with Dia de los Muertos, the Padres posted a teaser video on their social media platforms featuring WWE superstar, and San Diego native Dominik Mysterio placing a White hat bearing an Orange "S" and Navy Blue "D" and bill on to a traditional Day of the Dead altar. The blue and orange color palette was worn by the Padres between 1991 and 2003, including the franchise's most recent run to the World Series in 1998. The teaser ended with the appearance of a woman wearing traditional Day of the Dead facepaint before vanishing to an ad saying "Padres / Nike. City Connect 2.0 Coming April 2026." The city name is featured across the chest, which celebrates the binational region of "San Diego" and draws inspiration from the city's coastline and is outlined in a yellow/orange to resemble the sunsets in San Diego. The pants and hat are in a bone white, which has a trim and braid in a marigold pattern that is quintessential to Dia de los Muertos. The hat has a brim in obsidian blue with an interlocked "S" and "D" in the original Padre orange/obsidian blue, with the inner lining of the hat featuring famous San Diego landscaping in bone, marigold, aqua, fireberry, and Padre gold, combining all their uniform colors into one blend. The jocktag features a papel picado that resembles the team being located close to Mexico and has all the previous Padre logos and names. The right sleeve has a La Catrina patch honoring and celebrating Dia de los Muertos, which is an iconic holiday heavily celebrated in San Diego in front of an Aqua blue resembling the water color of San Diego.
- Texas Rangers (second design) retired their first version of the city connect "Peagle Uniform" following the 2025 season and will debut the second updated version on April 24, 2026. The Rangers second version of the city connect will pay tribute to the Mexican influence across the state of Texas. The jersey goes back to the Rangers' original color they wore during the 1980's and 90's, but has not been worn since 2022, which is a shade of cochineal red, a crimson dye that comes from a crushed-up cochineal insect, which is part of Mexican culture. The team opted to use "TEJAS" across the front of the jersey with a white outline, which is the Spanish word for Texas. The entire uniform uses a Charro-inspired piping, which is used with Mexican horsemen suits, as well as mariachi trajes, and is also worn by the Mariachis de los Texas Rangers. The right sleeve features a patch with papel picado, a decorative Mexican form of art used at birthdays, weddings, and Dia de los Muertos by cutting colorful paper into Mexican-style designs, and also features the State of Texas in place of where the Flag of Texas used to be. The hat uses the same cochineal red and has a block "T" logo in white using a raised weave that is similar to the design used in Mexican artistry.

=== No City Connect uniform ===
The following teams do not have a City Connect uniform

- Athletics, due to the process of the team moving to Las Vegas.
- New York Yankees, due to the team traditionally not wearing an alternate uniform.
- Chicago Cubs, due to the introduction of a city-inspired alternate uniform in 2025. Unlike the Athletics and Yankees, they did have a City Connect uniform from 2021 through 2024.

== Summary table ==
This is a summary list of the teams that have worn City Connect uniforms, including their reveal dates, on-field debut dates, most recent use, total number of appearances, total appearances for the current season, and usage patterns during the 2026 MLB season.

(Updated through September 26, 2026)

Team	On-field debut	Reveal date	Latest use	Times used	Times used in 2026	Usage	Sources
Arizona Diamondbacks	June 18, 2021	June 13, 2021	September 24, 2024	50	—N/a	Tuesday home games	
Arizona Diamondbacks	May 9, 2025	May 5, 2025	September 11, 2026	31	15	Friday home games	
Athletics	—N/a	—N/a	—N/a	—N/a	—N/a	—N/a	
Atlanta Braves	April 8, 2023	March 27, 2023	September 27, 2025	42	—N/a	Saturday home games	
Atlanta Braves	April 10, 2026	March 31, 2026	September 12, 2026	13	13	April 10–12; Saturday home games	
Baltimore Orioles	May 26, 2023	May 22, 2023	September 19, 2025	39	—N/a	Friday home games	
Baltimore Orioles	April 10, 2026	April 9, 2026	September 18, 2026	13	13	Friday home games	
Boston Red Sox	April 17, 2021	April 6, 2021	September 12, 2026	72	9	Patriots' Day weekend; Saturday home games	
Boston Red Sox	May 16, 2025	May 16, 2025	September 25, 2026	23	12	Friday home games	
Chicago Cubs	June 12, 2021	June 8, 2021	September 6, 2024	31	—N/a	Friday home games (June−September)	
Chicago White Sox	June 5, 2021	May 28, 2021	September 18, 2026	41	2	Monday home games	
Chicago White Sox	May 2, 2025	April 28, 2025	September 25, 2026	26	14	Friday home games	
Cincinnati Reds	May 19, 2023	May 13, 2023	September 18, 2026	46	11	Friday home games	
Cincinnati Reds	April 11, 2026	April 9, 2026	September 19, 2026	11	11	Saturday home games	
Cleveland Guardians	May 17, 2024	May 12, 2024	September 18, 2026	44	13	Friday home games	
Colorado Rockies	June 4, 2022	May 27, 2022	September 28, 2024	47	—N/a	Saturday home games	
Colorado Rockies	April 20, 2025	April 12, 2025	September 18, 2026	25	12	Friday home games	
Detroit Tigers	May 10, 2024	May 6, 2024	September 21, 2026	34	7	Monday home games	
Houston Astros	April 20, 2022	April 10, 2022	September 23, 2024	26	—N/a	Monday home games	
Houston Astros	March 31, 2025	March 19, 2025	August 31, 2026	20	8	Monday home games	
Kansas City Royals	April 30, 2022	April 25, 2022	September 19, 2025	48	—N/a	Friday home games	
Kansas City Royals	April 10, 2026	April 9, 2026	September 25, 2026	15	15	April 10–12; Friday home games	
Los Angeles Angels	June 11, 2022	June 6, 2022	September 15, 2026	58	12	Various home games	
Los Angeles Dodgers	August 20, 2021	August 19, 2021	September 18, 2023	18	—N/a	Various home games	
Los Angeles Dodgers	June 22, 2024	June 17, 2024	September 19, 2026	29	12	Saturday home games	
Miami Marlins	May 21, 2021	May 17, 2021	September 21, 2024	50	—N/a	Saturday home games	
Miami Marlins	May 3, 2025	April 30, 2025	September 25, 2026	25	14	Friday home games	
Milwaukee Brewers	June 24, 2022	June 17, 2022	September 26, 2025	58	—N/a	Friday home games	
Milwaukee Brewers	April 10, 2026	April 9, 2026	September 25, 2026	15	15	April 10–12; Friday home games	
Minnesota Twins	June 14, 2024	June 10, 2024	September 25, 2026	35	9	Friday home games	
New York Mets	April 27, 2024	April 19, 2024	September 5, 2026	39	10	Saturday home games	
New York Yankees	—N/a	—N/a	—N/a	—N/a	—N/a	—N/a	
Philadelphia Phillies	April 12, 2024	April 5, 2024	September 25, 2026	34	9	Friday home games	
Pittsburgh Pirates	June 27, 2023	June 22, 2023	September 19, 2025	34	—N/a	Friday home games	
Pittsburgh Pirates	April 17, 2026	April 9, 2026	September 18, 2026	12	12	Friday home games	
San Diego Padres	July 8, 2022	July 1, 2022	September 26, 2025	46	—N/a	Friday home games	
San Diego Padres	April 10, 2026	April 9, 2026	September 25, 2026	14	14	Friday home games	
San Francisco Giants	July 9, 2021	July 5, 2021	September 10, 2024	46	—N/a	Tuesday home games	
San Francisco Giants	April 8, 2025	April 8, 2025	September 22, 2026	26	12	Tuesday home games	
Seattle Mariners	May 5, 2023	April 28, 2023	September 25, 2026	58	13	Friday home games	
St. Louis Cardinals	May 25, 2024	May 20, 2024	September 11, 2026	36	12	Friday home games	
Tampa Bay Rays	May 3, 2024	April 29, 2024	August 29, 2026	41	10	Saturday home games	
Texas Rangers	April 21, 2023	April 17, 2023	September 19, 2025	47	—N/a	Friday home games	
Texas Rangers	April 24, 2026	April 9, 2026	September 19, 2026	13	13	Friday home games	
Toronto Blue Jays	May 31, 2024	May 30, 2024	September 25, 2026	42	13	Friday home games	
Washington Nationals	April 9, 2022	March 29, 2022	September 29, 2024	62	—N/a	Friday and Saturday home games	
Washington Nationals	March 29, 2025	March 23, 2025	September 26, 2026	40	12	Saturday home games	

== Reaction ==
Boston.com conducted a poll of its readers in April 2021 and found a polarized reaction to the Red Sox's yellow and blue City Connect jerseys. About 49% of respondents said that they loved the new uniforms, about 36% said that they hated them, and about 9% chose the "I'm speechless" option. After the Red Sox wore the City Connect uniforms for four consecutive games in September 2021, winning all four, manager Alex Cora said that the team would continue to wear them for as long as they kept winning. "I'm sorry, but if we continue winning, we've got to stay with them," Xander Bogaerts told NESN.

A columnist for the San Francisco Examiner wrote in May 2022 that the Giants had a record of 12–2 in their City Connect jerseys. Although some fans derided their design as looking like an orange Creamsicle, fans eventually warmed to the jersey, increasingly wearing them to games on Tuesday nights, when the team typically wears their City Connect uniforms.

Of the first 11 City Connect designs, USA Today's For the Win blog ranked the White Sox's uniform design as the best and the Giants' design as the worst. In a July 2022 review ranking the first 14 uniform designs, ESPN's Joon Lee described the City Connect program as the league's boldest alternative jersey designs since the Turn Ahead the Clock promotions of the late 1990s. Lee rated the Rockies' City Connect uniforms as the best, and the Dodgers as the worst.

The Padres' City Connect uniforms generated $240,000 in revenue at the team's official store on July 1, 2022, their first day of sale. The last time the team introduced a new uniform, in 2020, the team store sold $73,000 worth of merchandise on launch day.

Upon its announcement in 2023, the Texas Rangers' City Connect design met with polarized reactions from local sports media commentators and fans, particularly about the hybrid "Peagle" mascot that appeared on the uniform tops.

Baltimore's City Connect design drew positive reviews for the colorful interior patterns, and also criticism for its mostly black, unadorned exterior. The Orioles' players liked the look of their City Connect uniforms.

Of the 20 designs that were announced during the first three seasons of City Connect, Joon Lee ranked the Orioles' design 20th, noting comparisons to Great Britain's generic uniforms at the 2023 World Baseball Classic. Lee rated the Rockies' design as the best. Three writers for The Athletic voted on their preferences among the first 20 City Connect designs. The Giants' and Rangers' designs tied for last place; the White Sox were rated as the best.

== See also ==
- Major League Baseball uniforms
