= Ehrhardt Koch =

German-American businessman

- Born: 1886; Germany
- Died: 1954 (aged 67–68)
- Occupation: Businessman
- Known for: Founder of the New Era Cap Company

Ehrhardt Koch (1886–1954) was a German American businessman and founder of the New Era Cap Company.

Koch was born in Germany and immigrated to the East side of Buffalo, New York, with his parents in the late 19th century.

Koch worked for the Miller Brother's Cap Company making caps in 1902. After 18 years with Miller, Koch borrowed money from his aunt and founded the New Era Cap Company in 1920 in Buffalo.

Koch's only son, Harold, took over from his father as head of the firm and established the company's ties to Major League Baseball beginning in the 1950s. Koch died in 1954 at age 68. His company is still family owned today.
