= List of baseball bat manufacturers =

This is a list of notable baseball bat manufacturers, which includes manufacturers of both metal and wooden baseball bats.

== A–Z ==
- Akadema
- Birdman Bats
- Burke-Hanna MFG. Co. (1925-1976) — maker of the Batrite logo bat
- Chandler Bats
- DeMarini
- Easton Diamond Sports, LLC — acquired by Rawlings in 2020
- Elevate Sports
- JUICED
- Louisville Slugger
- Marucci Sports
- Mattingly Sports
- Mizuno
- Noble
- Rawlings
- Sabre Bats
- Sam Bat
- Tater
- Victus
- Viper Bats
- Warstic
- Zinger
- Zstick
