= Marucci Sports =

US sports equipment company

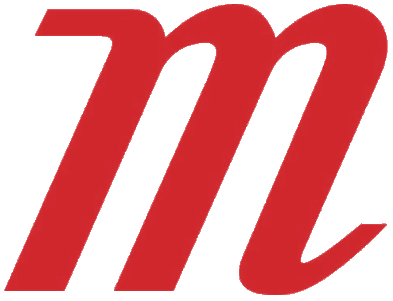
- Formerly: The Marucci Bat Company
- Type: Subsidiary
- Industry: Sports equipment
- Founded: 2002; 24 years ago
- Founder: 2002 - The Marucci Bat Company - Jack Marucci 2004 - The Marucci Bat Company - Jack Marucci, Joe Lawrence, Nathan Wood & Kurt Ainsworth 2011 - Marucci Sports
- Headquarters: Baton Rouge, Louisiana, United States
- Products: Baseball equipment
- Owner: Compass Diversified Holdings (2020–2023); Fox Factory (2023–2026)
- Website: maruccisports.com

Marucci Sports is an American sports equipment manufacturing company based in Baton Rouge, Louisiana. It focuses on baseball equipment, specifically producing bats, balls, gloves, batting gloves, batting helmets, and chest protectors. The company was originally founded in 2002 as the Marucci Bat Company by LSU Tigers head athletic trainer at that time, Jack Marucci. The company was acquired by the investment firm Compass Diversified Holdings in 2020 and later by Fox Factory for $572 million in 2023.

== History ==
In 2002, Jack Marucci, LSU Tigers head athletic trainer at that time, built his first baseball bat in his backyard shed after he was unable to find a suitable wooden bat for his son Gino. Jack's position as head athletic trainer at LSU at that time, provided him an opportunity to connect with former LSU baseball players who were then playing in MLB. Word of mouth traveled fast about his custom built wooden bats, and shortly thereafter he was making prototypes in his backyard shed for MLB players. In 2004, Jack brought in and partnered with Joe Lawrence and Kurt Ainsworth to capitalize and help grow and run the company

As of 2013, Marucci bats were used by one-third of Major League Baseball players, like David Ortiz, José Bautista, Albert Pujols, Chase Utley, Anthony Rizzo, Giancarlo Stanton, and Bryce Harper. In a relatively short period of time, Marucci took a large share of the baseball bat market from longtime industry leader Louisville Slugger, with industry tracking publications validating number 1 bat in the majors since 2013 by a wide margin.

While in 2006 Marucci supplied 4% of MLB players, by 2016 the company supplied 40%, with about 400-500 bats made a day.

In 2020, Marucci Sports was acquired by American investment group Compass Diversified Holdings for USD 200 million.

They have made bats known as the Cat 6, Cat 7, Cat 8, Cat 8 Connect, Cat 9, Cat 9 Connect, and Cat 9 composite for USSSA baseball and BBCOR baseball. They have also made the Marucci F5, Marruci Cat, and Marucci Cat Connect for USA baseball which is mainly used in little league.

In 2017, Marucci acquired rival Victus Sports, a manufacturer of bats.

Marucci bats were the number one or number two most popular bats on opening day of Major League Baseball from 2019 to 2024.

In 2025, Marucci and Victus bats became the official bats of Major League Baseball.

In 2026, Fox Factory Holding Corp. completed the sale of Wheelhouse Holdings Inc., the parent company of Marucci Sports LLC, to Squared Up Holdings, LLC for an enterprise value of $225 million. Squared Up Holdings, LLC is an acquisition vehicle for an investor group led by and including members of Marucci's existing senior management. The transaction concludes the review of strategic alternatives for Marucci that the Company announced in February 2026.
