= Kurt Ainsworth =

American baseball player (born 1978)

- Pitcher
- Born: September 9, 1978 (age 47); Baton Rouge, Louisiana, U.S.
- Batted: Left Threw: Right

MLB debut
- September 5, 2001, for the San Francisco Giants

Last MLB appearance
- May 14, 2004, for the Baltimore Orioles

MLB statistics
- Win–loss record: 6–8
- Earned run average: 5.19
- Strikeouts: 90
- Stats at Baseball Reference

Teams
- San Francisco Giants (2001–2003); Baltimore Orioles (2003–2004)
Medals
Men's baseball
Representing United States
Men's Olympics
Gold medal – first place	2000 Sydney	Team competition

Kurt Harold Ainsworth (born September 9, 1978) is an American former professional baseball pitcher. He played for the San Francisco Giants and Baltimore Orioles of Major League Baseball (MLB) and went to Louisiana State University. Ainsworth also won an Olympic Games gold medal with the United States national baseball team at the 2000 Summer Olympics in Sydney. Following his professional baseball career, Ainsworth co-founded Marucci Sports and currently serves as the company's CEO.

== Early life ==
Kurt Ainsworth attended Catholic High in Baton Rouge, Louisiana. As a senior, he was a first team All-State selection, won the Student-Athlete Award, and was named Catholic High Man of the Year. After his senior baseball season, he played in the Louisiana All-Star game. His son Alex pitches (pitched) at Catholic High.

== Professional career ==
After playing collegiately for Louisiana State University, Ainsworth was the first-round draft pick (24th overall) of the San Francisco Giants in the 1999 MLB draft. He signed with the Giants and finished the 1999 season with the Salem-Keizer Volcanoes of the Class A Northwest League, where he started 10 games and accumulated a record of 3-3 and an ERA of 1.61.

He spent the 2000 season with the Shreveport Captains of the Texas League. At the age of 21, he was the same age as many of the players in rookie leagues, but he went 10–9 with an ERA of 3.30 and 130 strikeouts in 158 innings in the Class AA Texas League. This earned him a promotion to the Class AAA Fresno Grizzlies of the Pacific Coast League in 2001. Although he again went 10–9 at Fresno, his ERA in 27 games was 5.07; nevertheless, he was still called up to the MLB and made two relief appearances for the Giants in 2001.

The 2002 season was a more successful one for Ainsworth. He again spent much of the season with Fresno, but with better results; his ERA in 19 starts there was 3.41, and his record for the season was 8–6. He made six appearances (four starts) for the Giants during the season; although his record for the Giants was just 1–2, his ERA in 25 2/3 innings was 2.10, and he struck out 15 batters.

Just as Ainsworth's career was looking very promising, it started falling prey to serious arm injuries in 2003. He began the season in the Giants' starting rotation and made 11 starts for them; he went 5–4 with an ERA of 3.82 in 66 innings pitched. On June 3, 2003, he was placed on the disabled list with inflammation in his shoulder. He made a rehabilitation appearance with Fresno on June 15, but lasted just two innings; later in the month, doctors found that his shoulder blade was broken, an extremely unusual injury for a pitcher. On July 31, the trading deadline, the Giants traded him and Damian Moss to the Baltimore Orioles for Sidney Ponson. He was not activated from the disabled list until September 20, and he appeared in just three games for the Orioles in 2003, pitching 2 1/3 innings in relief and accumulating an 0–1 record with an 11.57 ERA.

Ainsworth recovered in time to start the 2004 season with the Orioles, but he made only seven starts before the Orioles demoted him to the Class AAA Ottawa Lynx. He pitched only four innings for the Lynx before he went on the disabled list again with right elbow inflammation; he was out until mid-August, and he finished the season by making two rehab starts for the Orioles's short-season Class A club, the Aberdeen IronBirds.

Ainsworth made two appearances for the Orioles in spring training in 2005. In three innings, he allowed five runs, for an ERA of 15.00, and his record was 0–1. He was sidelined beginning in spring training with what he would find out was a torn labrum and a torn rotator cuff. He considered retirement but underwent shoulder surgery in late March. He hoped to make a return in the 2006 season, but was unsuccessful and never pitched professionally again.

== Business career ==
In 2004, while recovering from elbow inflammation, Ainsworth began the Marucci Bat Co. along with LSU Head Athletic Trainer, Jack Marucci, and former Toronto Blue Jays second baseman, Joe Lawrence. They began producing bats for a small number of Major League players.

In 2006, Ainsworth and Lawrence, along with the help of another former professional player, Brad Cresse, formed a new company called Big Leagues of Baton Rouge to generate revenue while the Marucci Bat Company continued to grow. All excess profits from Big Leagues of Baton Rouge were invested back into Marucci Bat Company.

Ainsworth helped lead the purchase of an Amish-run wood mill in Pennsylvania in 2008. The acquisition of the mill solidified Marucci's superior wood supply, and it still supplies all of Marucci's wood today.

In 2009, Ainsworth and Lawrence sold their stake in Big Leagues of Baton Rouge and joined with former White House Press Secretary, Reed Dickens, to form Marucci Sports. This company would eventually buy Marucci Bat Company in 2011.

Today, Marucci Sports is the number one bat in the Big Leagues, and produces elite baseball and softball equipment. The Associated Press calls the company "bat maker to the stars", and Forbes Magazine highlighted it as one of the top growth brands in the country.
