= Baseball glove =

Large leather glove worn by baseball players

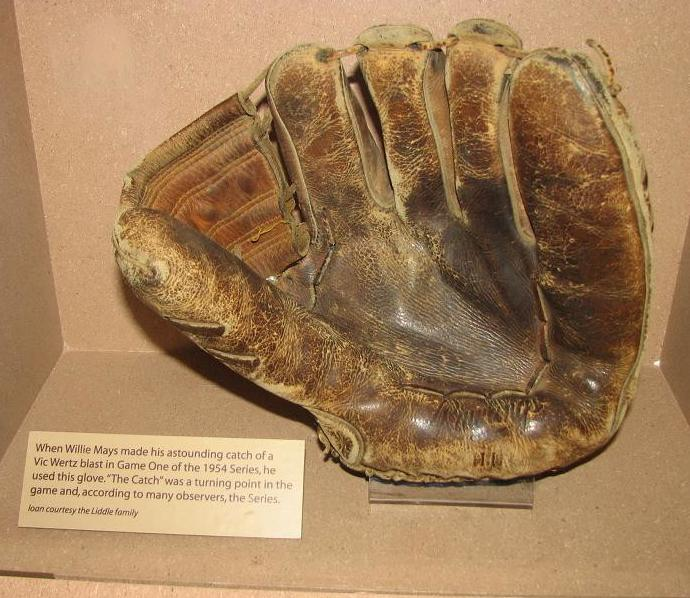
"Right-handed" baseball glove worn on the left hand of center fielder Willie Mays during the 1954 World Series.

A baseball glove or mitt (Note: The main difference between baseball gloves and mitts is that gloves have fingers and mitts don't, and the first basemen and catcher are the only positions allowed to use mitts.) is a large glove worn by baseball players of the defending team, which assists players in catching and fielding balls hit by a batter or thrown by a teammate. Gloves are traditionally made of leather, but today other options exist, such as PVC and synthetic leather.

By convention, the glove is described by the handedness of the intended wearer, rather than the hand on which the glove is worn: a glove that fits on the left hand—used by a right-handed thrower—is called a right-handed (RH) or "right-hand throw" (RHT) glove. Conversely, a left-handed glove (LH or LHT) is worn on the right hand, allowing the player to throw the ball with the left hand.

== History ==
Bid McPhee simulating playing second base without a glove

Early baseball was a game played without gloves. During the gradual transition to gloves, a player who continued to play without one was called a barehanded catcher; this did not refer to the position of catcher, but rather to the practice of catching with bare hands. The earliest glove was not webbed and not particularly well suited for catching but was used more to swat a ball to the ground so that it could be picked up.

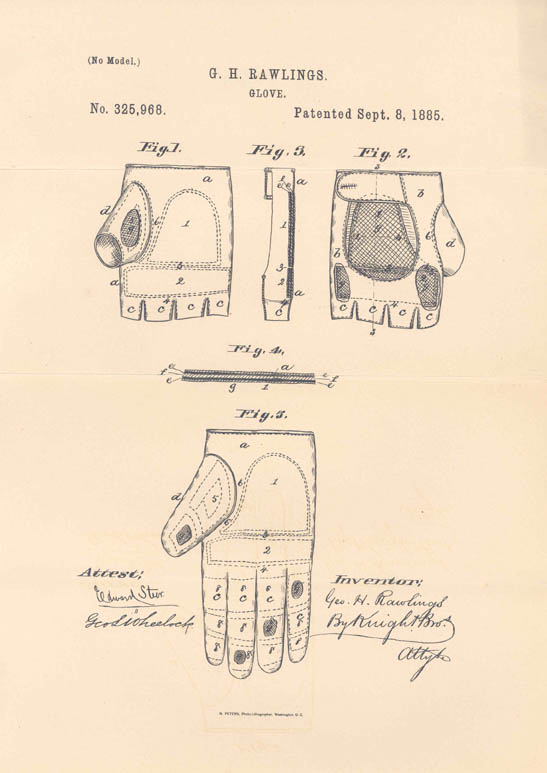
An 1885 glove patent

One of the first players believed to have used a baseball glove was Doug Allison, a catcher for the Cincinnati Red Stockings, in 1870, due to an injured left hand. The first confirmed glove use was by Charlie Waitt, a St. Louis outfielder and first baseman who, in 1875, donned a pair of flesh-colored gloves. Glove use slowly caught on as more and more players began using different forms of gloves.

Many early baseball gloves were simple leather gloves with the fingertips cut off, supposedly to allow for the same control of a bare hand but with extra padding. For the first two decades of professional baseball, these types of gloves were worn primarily by catchers, who sustained frequent hand injuries to such a point that duties for catching typically alternated each day at a time when field positions did not carry backups. The catcher's mitt, a glove designed to be much larger than the hand and to cover it entirely, were offered for sale for the first time in 1890. Pitcher, first baseman and outfielder Albert Spalding, originally skeptical of glove use, influenced more infielders to begin using gloves. Spalding later founded the sporting goods company Spalding, which still manufactures baseball gloves, along with other sports equipment. By the mid-1890s, it was normal for players to wear gloves in the field.

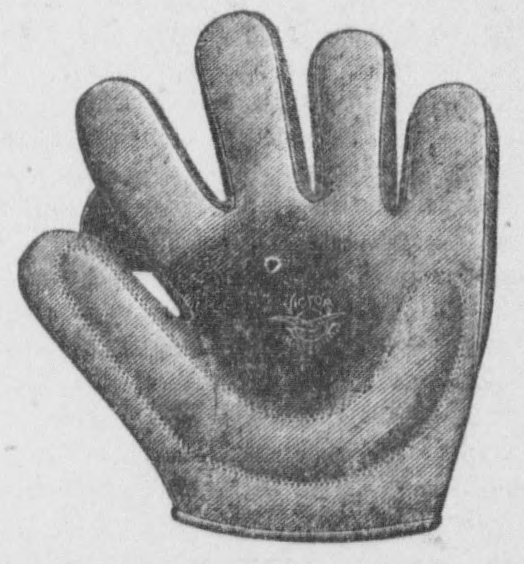
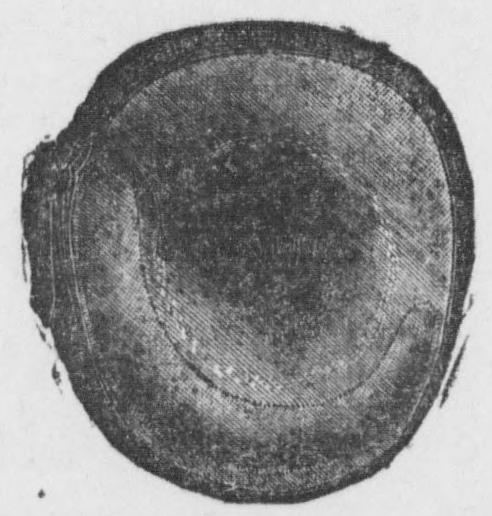
Baseball gloves, 1904

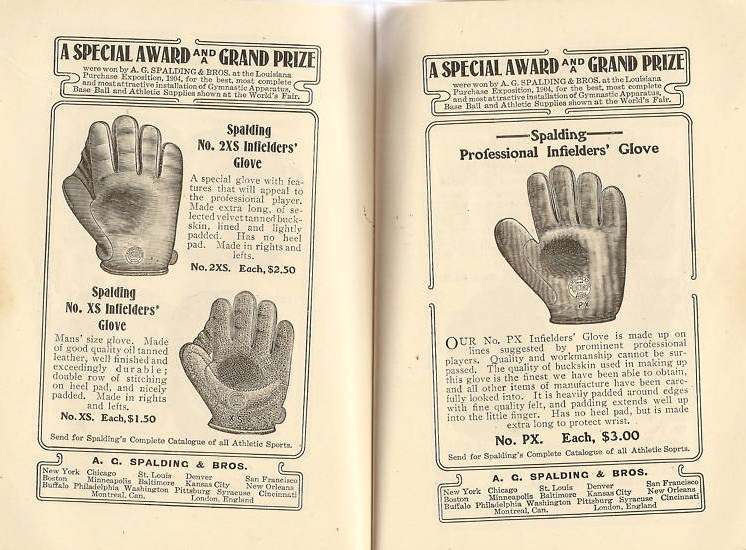
A.G. Spalding & Bros. advertisement for infielder gloves, 1905

In the early 1900s baseball glove manufacturers started experimenting with a "full web" or "web-pocketed" gloves, gloves with a small 0.5" ~ 1" piece of leather connecting the thumb and index finger. Unlike current webbing, this was often made of a single piece of leather fully connected to both fingers of the glove, not with strips of leather connecting both sides of the glove as would be seen starting in the 1920s. John Snell attributes the decrease in errors over the course of the beginning of the 1900s in part to this change in glove design, and argues that "This modification to the glove represented a fundamental change in the way the glove was perceived; it was no longer merely a piece of protective gear but rather a specialized tool for better fielding".

In 1920, Bill Doak, a pitcher for the St. Louis Cardinals, suggested that a web be placed between the first finger and the thumb in order to create a pocket. This design soon became the standard for baseball gloves. Doak patented his design and sold it to Rawlings. His design became the precursor to modern gloves and enabled Rawlings to become the preferred glove of professional players.

For many years, it was customary for fielders to leave their gloves on the field when their team went in to bat. This practice was prohibited by the major leagues in 1954.

Baseball gloves have grown progressively larger since their inception. While catching in baseball had always been two-handed, gloves eventually grew to a size that made it easier to catch the ball in the webbing of the glove, using the off-hand to keep the ball from falling out. A glove is typically worn on the non-dominant hand, leaving the dominant hand for the more strenuous and precise task of throwing the ball; for example, a right-handed player would wear a glove on their left hand, which would still be referred to as a "right handed glove".

The shape and size of the baseball glove are governed by official baseball rules. Section 3.00 - Equipment and Uniforms specifies glove dimensions and materials in parts 3.04 through 3.07.

== Modern day ==
The structure and quality of the baseball glove have developed greatly over the past century. Today, the production of baseball gloves is much more precise and efficient. This has greatly increased the usefulness and accessibility of baseball gloves to the general population. Currently, Easton is "experimenting with combining leather and Kevlar (used in bullet-proof vests) in a new ultra-lightweight glove line". Manufacturers have also designed new, non-traditional types of gloves to suit non-traditional players. Also, manufacturers are personalizing gloves for high-caliber players to help increase their exposure on national television.

Although there have been numerous advances in baseball glove design, the greatest arguably came with the advent of the catcher's mitt. Yet despite state-of-the-art mitts being used by catchers, a Wake Forest University study of 36 U.S. minor-league players demonstrated that the mitts did not offer enough protection from hand and wrist injuries.

The highest-quality baseball gloves are typically made of heavy leather. These leather gloves usually take more time for the player to break in. They also provide a tighter, more personalized fit for the player. This is an improvement from youth and recreational gloves, which tend to feature palm pads and/or adjustable Velcro wrist straps. These gloves take less time to break in or are pre-broken in, are less personal and more "one size fits all".

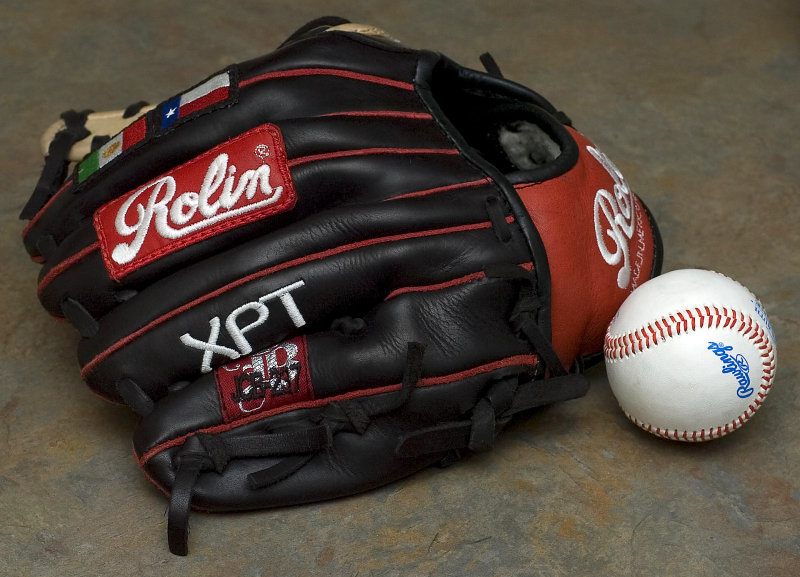
A custom-made "Rolin" baseball glove

== Varieties ==
Baseball gloves are measured by starting at the top of the index finger of the glove and measuring down the finger, along the inside of the pocket and then out to the heel of the glove. Gloves typically range in size from 9 inches (229 mm) (youth starter size) to 12 3/4 inches (324 mm) for adult outfield play. Catcher's mitts, unlike those of other gloves, are measured around the circumference, and they typically have 32-to-34-inch (813–864 mm) patterns.

The shape and size of a glove are described by its pattern. Modern gloves have become quite specialized, with position-specific patterns:

- Catcher's mitts are called "mitts" because they lack individual fingers, like mittens. They have extra padding and a hinged, claw-like shape that helps them funnel fastballs into the pocket and provide a good target for pitchers. Some catchers use mitts with phosphorescent paint around the ridges to provide a clearer target for the pitcher. In addition, catcher's mitts come in single hinge and dual-hinge varieties. If required to catch a knuckleball, a catcher will typically use an even larger mitt. Some knuckleball catchers have even experimented using first baseman's mitts, as described below.
- First baseman's mitts also lack individual fingers. They are generally very long and wide to help them pick or scoop badly thrown balls from infielders. These mitts usually have 12 1/2-to-12 3/4-inch (318–324 mm) patterns, measured from wrist to the tip. Because first basemen are often left-handed, first basemen's mitts are readily available to fit on the right hand. Hank Greenberg is often credited as the first to wear this style of the glove in the field. Some catchers, such as Victor Martinez, use a first base mitt while catching knuckleballers, though doing so comes with a disadvantage: because first basemen are rarely required to make a quick throw to another base, first base mitts tend to be deeper, making it more difficult to get the ball when trying to catch a runner stealing.
- Infielders' gloves, unlike the first baseman's mitt, tend to be smaller. They have shallow pockets to allow fielders to remove the ball easily in order to make a quick throw to a base. The webbing is often open to allow dirt to pass through the glove so that infielders do not pull out a handful of dirt when trying to remove the ball from the glove. Infielder's gloves typically have 11-to-12-inch (279–305 mm) patterns.
- Pitchers' gloves usually have a closed, opaque webbing to allow pitchers to conceal their grip on the ball (which, in part, determines the behavior of the pitch in flight) from the batter. Pitcher-specific gloves tend to have 11 3/4-to-12-inch (298–305 mm) patterns; some pitchers such as Gio González use gloves with patterns as large as 12 1/4 inches (311 mm). Infield gloves with intricate webbing are also used by pitchers. Switch pitchers use a glove with six fingers (see below).
- Outfielder's gloves are usually quite long with deep pockets to help catch fly balls on the run or in a dive, and to keep outfielders from having to bend down as far to field a ground ball. These gloves typically have 12-to-12 3/4-inch (305–324 mm) patterns, measured from wrist to the tip. They are frequently worn-in differently from those of infielders, with a flatter squeeze rather than the infielder's rounded style.
- Left-hand throw gloves are any of the gloves above, but designed to be worn on the right hand (for left-handed players). Left handed players are most frequently pitchers, first basemen, or outfielders, while left-handed catchers or third basemen are rare.
- Switch-thrower's gloves are gloves with a second thumb pocket on the opposite side of the glove, to allow it to be worn on either side of the hand. At the major league level, this glove has been used only by switch-pitcher Pat Venditte.
- Sliding mitts were introduced in the 2010s as an evolution of earlier wrist guards that protect runners who slide onto base.

== Major glove manufacturers ==
- All-Star Sporting Goods
- 44 Pro Gloves
- Akadema
- Easton
- Hillerich & Bradsby, under the Louisville Slugger brand name
- Marucci
- Mizuno
- Nike
- Nokona
- Rawlings
- Spalding
- Warstic
- Wilson

== See also ==
- Baseball clothing and equipment
- Wicket-keeper's gloves, a similar glove used in cricket
- Nobuyoshi Tsubota
