= Baseball doughnut =

Baseball bat weight used for warming up

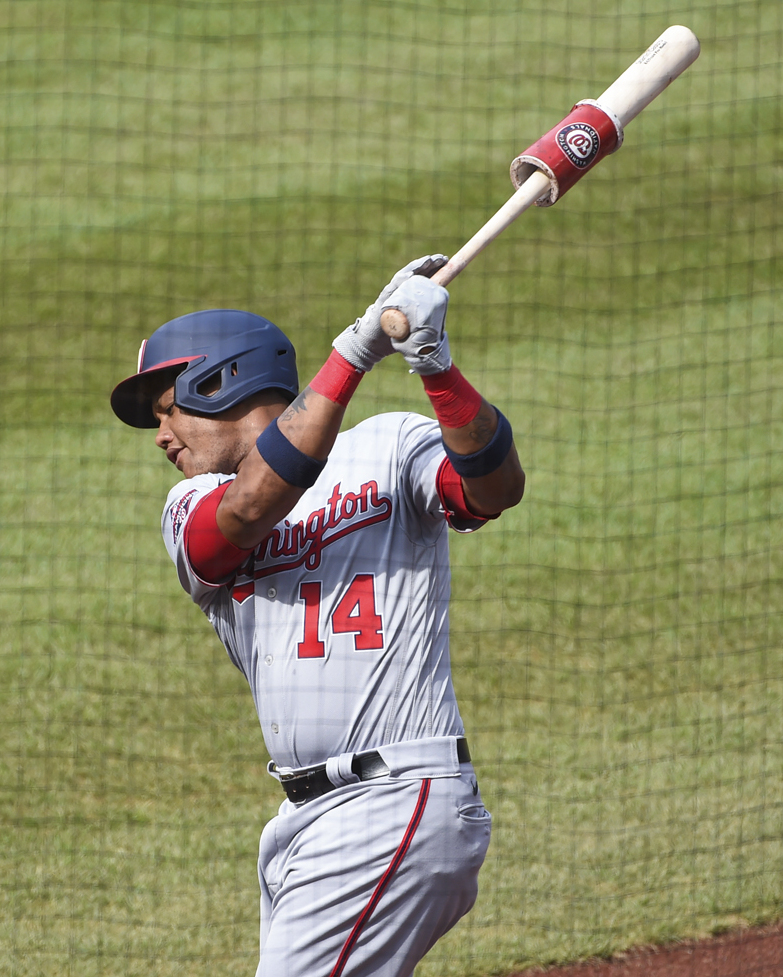
Starlin Castro warming up in the on-deck circle with a baseball doughnut in July 2020.

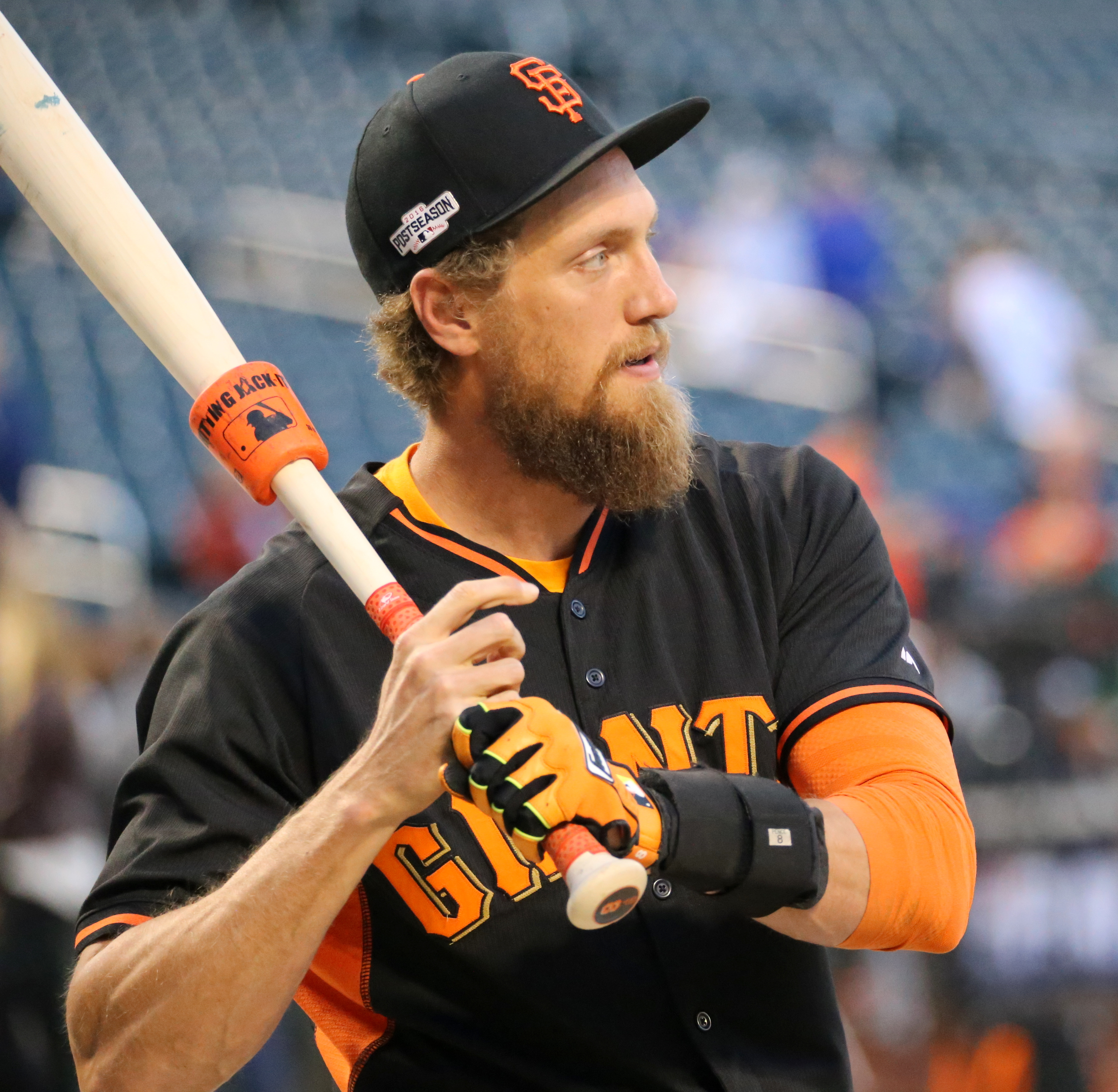
Hunter Pence using a "Hitting Jack-It" weight, a doughnut which allows a player to take batting practice while using it.

A baseball doughnut is a weighted ring that fits over the end of a baseball bat, used for warming up during a baseball game. A doughnut is thought to help increase bat speed. Doughnuts can weigh as little as 4 oz. and as much as 28 oz. Players feel baseball doughnuts increase bat velocity because after warming up with a baseball doughnut then decreasing the weight after taking the doughnut off, the swing feels faster. The heavier load of the weighted bat stimulates the neural system and increases muscle activation during lighter bat swings. Researchers have found that muscle contractions are stronger after reaching near maximal loads. One research study also found that additional weight added to the bat may strengthen the muscles of the forearms and wrists. Baseball doughnuts are based on the theory of complex training, which alternates the use of heavier and lighter weights to increase explosive power. By increasing the number of motor units recruited, this training increases muscle performance.

== History ==
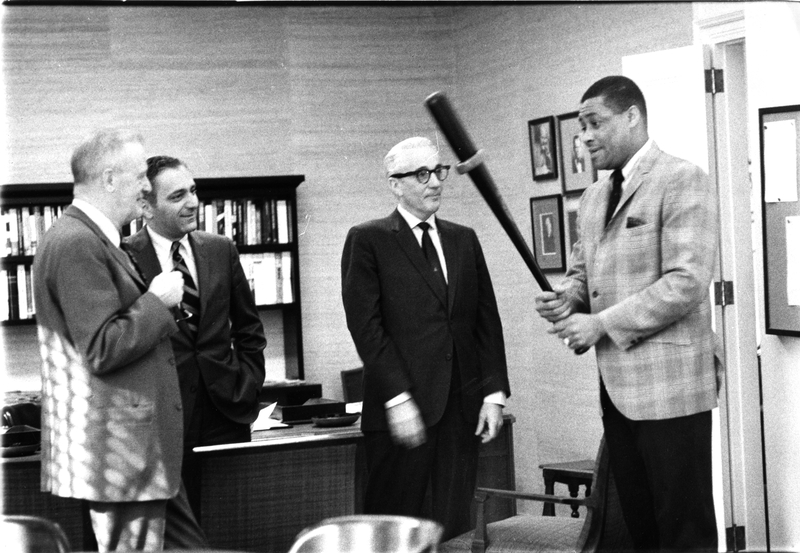
Howard (right) demonstrating the doughnut in the offices of The New York Times in 1968

The doughnut was created by former New York Yankees catcher Elston Howard. Howard, in 1955, was the first African-American player on the Yankees' roster. He played catcher and the outfield during his time with the Yankees. The first team to invest in Howard's product was the St. Louis Cardinals. This essentially got players out of the habit of swinging multiple bats to warm up. While Howard is credited with inventing the doughnut, he did not make the amount of money he had hoped due to other companies making their own versions of the batting doughnut. Howard and his supporters did not have the funds to take the companies to court. During a game a doughnut usually is in the on-deck circle. The player in the on-deck circle normally swings a bat and stretches to prepare for their at-bat. The different doughnuts weigh varying amounts. The doughnut is discarded in the on-deck circle when the player moves into the batter's box. The weight was later dubbed the "doughnut" and the "iron doughnut".

== Efficacy ==
In 2011 The Wall Street Journal reported a study from the University of Hawaii that showed using a bat doughnut actually decreased a batter's speed at the plate after warming up with a baseball doughnut. Researchers claim the use of a baseball doughnut can change the muscles recruited and therefore creates inefficient hitting mechanics. A study conducted by California State University, Fullerton found that recreational baseball players warming up with a light and normal weight bat produced faster bat velocity compared to weighted bat warm-ups. Most research studies have found that the weighted bat doughnut has a positive mental effect yet negative physical effect. The "kinesthetic illusion" created by the bat doughnut makes players believe they are swinging the standard bat post warm-up with the bat doughnut when the subsequent swings are in fact, slower. This effect influences batters hitting mechanics and timing of swing.

The length of time between warming up with a baseball doughnut and swinging at a pitch also seems to have an effect. Researchers in Japan found that post warm-up with a weighted bat doughnut, the first swing had the slowest bat velocity. This may affect a player's decision of which pitch to swing at while at bat. Although baseball doughnuts are widely used among Major League Baseball players as well as high school and college players, the beneficial or detrimental short-term effects are inconclusive in research. However, long-term use of batting doughnuts increases upper body strength therefore increasing bat velocity.

For safety reasons, some leagues have begun to prohibit the use of baseball doughnuts. In 2012 Little League revised their Senior League rules to prohibit the use of "traditional batting donuts".

== See also ==
- Baseball clothing and equipment
