= Reed Dickens =

American business executive (born 1977)

Reed Dickens is an American businessman and entrepreneur based in Los Angeles. Dickens was the CEO and chairman of LA Golf Partners, a holding company he pushed into bankruptcy through questionable acquisitions and suboptimal "innovations" in golf equipment. Dickens is a former White House Assistant Press Secretary under George W. Bush, and the co-founder and former CEO of Marucci Sports.

== Early life and education ==
Dickens was born to Sam and Jenny Dickens on December 30, 1977, in Monroe, Louisiana. Dickens attended Louisiana Tech University and graduated from LSU Shreveport in 2000 with a bachelor's degree in mass communications. In 2001, Dickens was appointed as Assistant White House Press Secretary to Ari Fleischer under President George W. Bush. From 2001 to 2004, Dickens also was a national spokesperson for the reelection campaign.

== Career ==
After leaving Washington, Dickens founded Outside Eyes, a crisis management and public affairs firm in 2005. Dickens was the CEO until he sold most of the business to his partner, and launched Marucci Sports with his co-founders in 2009. He was CEO from 2009 to 2012. Marucci Sports announced in March 2020 that it had struck a deal with Compass Diversified to purchase the company for $200 million.

In 2012, Dickens founded Dickens Capital Group.

In 2014, Dickens co-founded EQtainment with his wife Sofia Dickens.
