= Nobuyoshi Tsubota =

Japanese baseball glove craftsman

Nobuyoshi Tsubota (March 12, 1933 - April 3, 2022) was a former Mizuno baseball glove craftsman. He created gloves for Sadaharu Oh, Ichiro Suzuki, Hideki Matsui, and others.

== Biography ==
Tsubota was born in March 1933 in Osaka Prefecture, Japan. He was a boys baseball player. In 1948, at the age of 15, he joined Mizuno. He aspired to become a glove maker, and after a long period of work, at the age of 40, he was finally given the task of making custom-made gloves. He created gloves for top Japanese and American players such as Sadaharu Oh, Tatsunori Hara, Ichiro Suzuki, Hideki Matsui, Hideo Nomo, Daisuke Matsuzaka, Pete Rose, and Bobby Valentine, and was called a glove master. He is also known for being the first to introduce position-specific gloves to the world. In 1998, he was selected as a "Modern Master Craftsman" by the Ministry of Labor (currently the Ministry of Health, Labour and Welfare), and in 2000 he received the Medal with Yellow Ribbon. He held the title of "Glove Meister", the highest rank among Mizuno's craftsmen, and retired in 2008. He died on April 3, 2022, due to old age, at the age of 89. Ichiro Suzuki remembered Tsubota and praised him, saying, "The demands of the players were sometimes cruel to the craftsmen, but he always created things that exceeded my expectation. He was truly a master craftsman."

Although his title was glove craftsman, he himself insisted that he was not a craftsman; he was an engineer who faithfully responded to the players' requests rather than imposing himself on him. "Our teachers are the players. Our job is to give shape to each player's wishes. We don't need the commitment of craftsmen. If we impose our own opinions on them, it's no good." The glove he worked the hardest on was not for a professional athlete, but for a boy who lost fingers.

In the spring of 1978, Mizuno expanded into the United States. Tsubota and his team loaded the gloves into a camper and toured major league camps. When he was asked to repair it, he gladly accepted it. Tsubota's hands, which could quickly grasp a player's characteristics and fix them in minutes, were called "magic hands".

== Book ==
- 坪田信義、根本真吾 (2010). 迷ったときこそ、続けなさい！. クロスメディア・パブリッシング（インプレス）. ISBN 978-4844370857.
