= Baseball clothing and equipment =

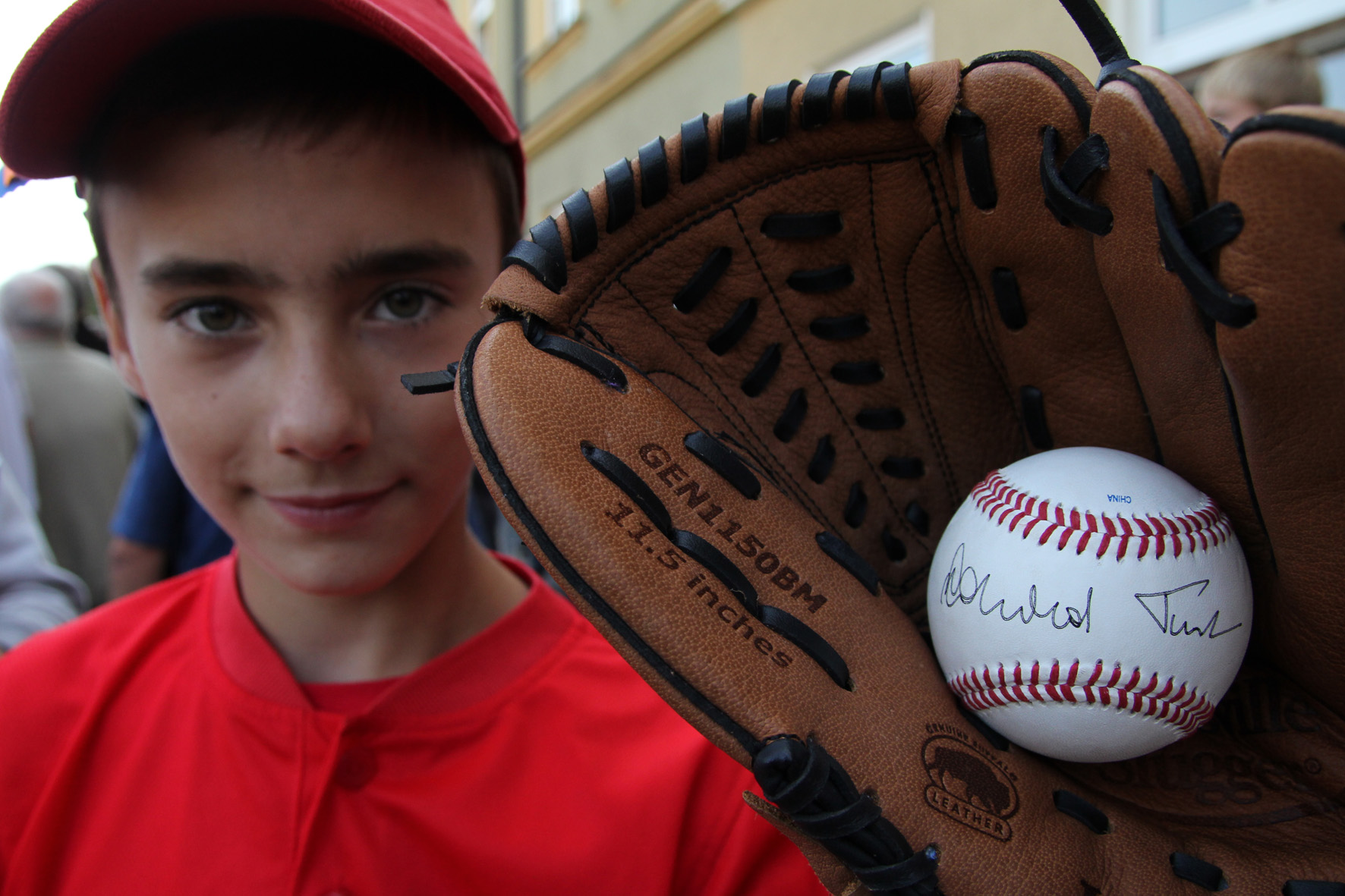
A child holds a baseball signed by Donald Tusk in a baseball glove

Bat
A rounded, solid wooden or hollow aluminum bat. Wooden bats are traditionally made from ash wood, though maple and bamboo is also sometimes used. Aluminum bats are not permitted in professional leagues, but are frequently used in amateur leagues. Composite bats are also available, essentially wooden bats with a metal rod inside. Bamboo bats are also becoming popular.
Ball
A cork sphere, tightly wound with layers of yarn or string and covered with a stitched leather coat.
Base
One of four corners of the infield which must be touched by a runner in order to score a run; more specifically, they are canvas bags (at first, second, and third base) and a rubber plate (at home).
Glove
Leather gloves worn by players in the field. Long fingers and a webbing between the thumb and first finger allows the fielder to catch the ball more easily.
Catcher's mitt
Leather mitt worn by catchers. It is much wider than a normal fielder's glove and the four fingers are connected. The mitt is also better-padded than the standard fielder's glove.
First baseman's mitt
Leather mitt worn by first basemen. It is longer and wider than a standard fielder's glove. The four fingers are connected and the glove is rounded like a catcher's mitt. A first baseman's mitt has a bit more padding than a standard fielder's glove
Batting gloves
Gloves often worn on one or both hands by the batter. They offer additional grip and eliminate some of the shock when making contact with the ball.
Batting helmet
Helmet worn by batter to protect the head and the ear facing the pitcher from the ball. Professional models have only one ear protector (left ear for right-handed batters, right ear for lefties), amateur and junior helmets usually have ear protectors on both sides, for better protection from loose balls, and to reduce costs to teams (all players can use the same style of helmet).
Cap
Hat worn by all players. Designed to shade the eyes from the sun, this hat design has become popular with the general public.
Catcher's helmet
Protective helmet with face mask worn by the catcher. Newer styles feature a fully integrated helmet and mask, similar to a hockey goalie mask. More traditional versions were a separate mask worn over a helmet similar to a batting helmet, but with no ear protection and worn backwards.
Jockstrap with cup pocket
also called jock or athletic supporter. An undergarment worn by boys and men for support of the testicles and penis during sports. A jockstrap by itself holds the testicles up and close to the body to help keep them from being squished between the thighs, or from twisting or hanging out. The jockstrap with cup pocket contains a pocket to hold a protective cup.
Protective cup
Also called a baseball cup, box, athletic cup – made of hard impact-resistant plastic or light metal, often with flexible sides for comfort and protection, designed to protect the testicles and groin from impact of a baseball, baseball bat, cleats, or any other moving object. Absolutely required for catchers, pitchers, and often all infielders. Many leagues require all male players to wear jockstrap and cup for practices and games.
Pelvic protector
Provides groin protection for females against impact.
Uniform
Shirt and pants worn by all players, coaches and managers. Each team generally has a unique pattern of colors and designs. Traditionally, the home team's uniform is predominantly white with the team's nickname, and the visiting team's is predominantly gray with (usually, but not always) the team's city. Teams often have white, gray and colored jerseys; colored jerseys can be worn at home or on the road, depending on the team's preference.
Sliding shorts
Padded support shorts sometimes worn to protect the thighs when the player slides into the bases. Some sliding shorts contain a pocket for a protective cup. This is so the player does not have to wear a jockstrap and sliding shorts at the same time, although many players find the cup is held in place better by wearing it in a jockstrap under sliding shorts.
Sliding mitt
Often nicknamed "oven mitt" it is a mitt that baserunners often wear when on base to prevent injury to fingers and thumbs when sliding into base.
Stirrups
Sunglasses
Worn to shade the eyes from the sun.
Baseball cleats
Baseball specific shoes worn by the player for better traction. The cleats themselves are either rubber or metal.
Baseball doughnut
A weighted ring that fits over the end of a baseball bat, used for warming up during a baseball game. A doughnut can help increase bat speed.

== See also ==
- Baseball
- Baseball uniform
- Baseball field
- Baseball positions
- Sports equipment
