= Boning (baseball) =

Way to harden the surface of a baseball bat

Boning is the practice in American baseball of treating a baseball bat with a bone (typically a cattle femur). The bone is run repeatedly up and down the barrel of the bat. The practice has the benefit of slightly hardening the bat by compressing the surface wood cells. Some also hold to the superstitious belief that because bone and hide go together and baseballs are covered in hide, a boned bat will attract baseballs to it and thus improve one's hitting.

The bone may be bolted to a fixed surface, the bat being moved over the bone rather than the other way around. Sometimes another stationary hard surface or a bottle is used, as these can be as good at hardening the bat, although not imparting the superstitious benefit.

According to some sources, a harder bat surface, having less "give", experiences less deformation, thus forcing more deformation onto the baseball. The ball, being softer than wood, deforms more, so more kinetic energy is absorbed by the deformation, giving a lower coefficient of restitution to the entire event, and thus less speed of the ball coming off the bat, although the practical effect may be small; see bouncing ball physics. Other sources claim the opposite effect, and no conclusive testing proving the matter either way has been conducted. In any case, bat weight, swing speed, pitch speed, and contact angle are more important factors.

[T]his tree near the river where I lived was split by lightning. I liked the wood inside of it so I cut me out a bat. Hadn't used it much until I played semipro ball, but I always kept it oiled with sweet oil and boned it so it wouldn’t chip.

— Roy Hobbs, in Bernard Malamud's The Natural

Boning is also held to lengthen bat life by reducing splintering.

Unlike corking, boning is entirely legal under baseball rules.

Through most of the 20th century, the great majority of major league bats were made of ash wood. In 1997, maple wood bats were permitted in major league games, and became widely used in the 21st century, following the example of home run champion Barry Bonds. Maple being harder than ash, there is less need for boning. Also, in the early and mid 20th century bats had little factory processing beyond lathing, while modern bats undergo more factory processing, often including hardening and polishing. Consequently, boning is less efficacious and somewhat less common than in the early and mid 20th century.

Sometimes, boning bats would be the duty of the batboy.
