= Batting helmet =

Protective head covering worn by baseball players

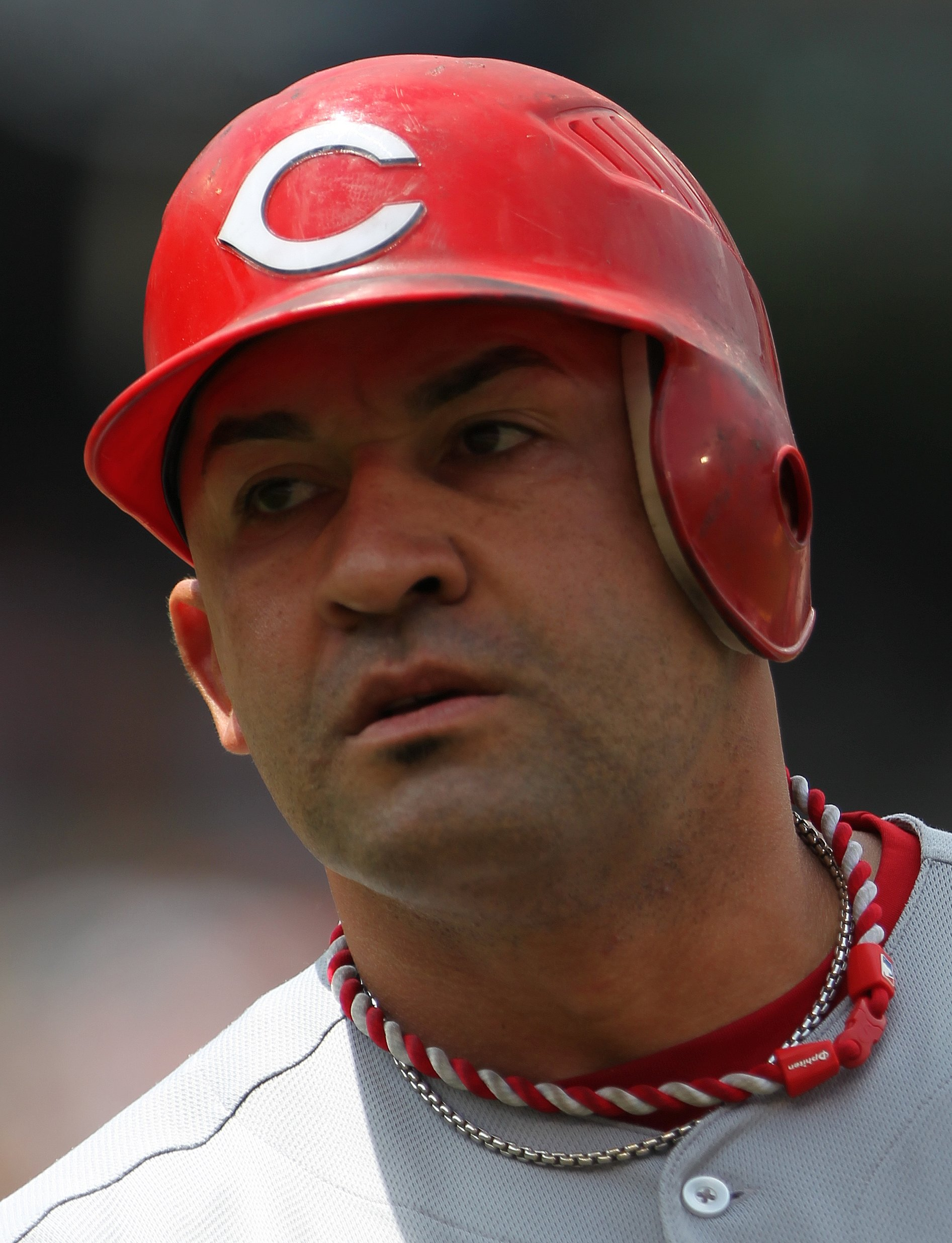
One-ear flap MLB batting helmet, 2011

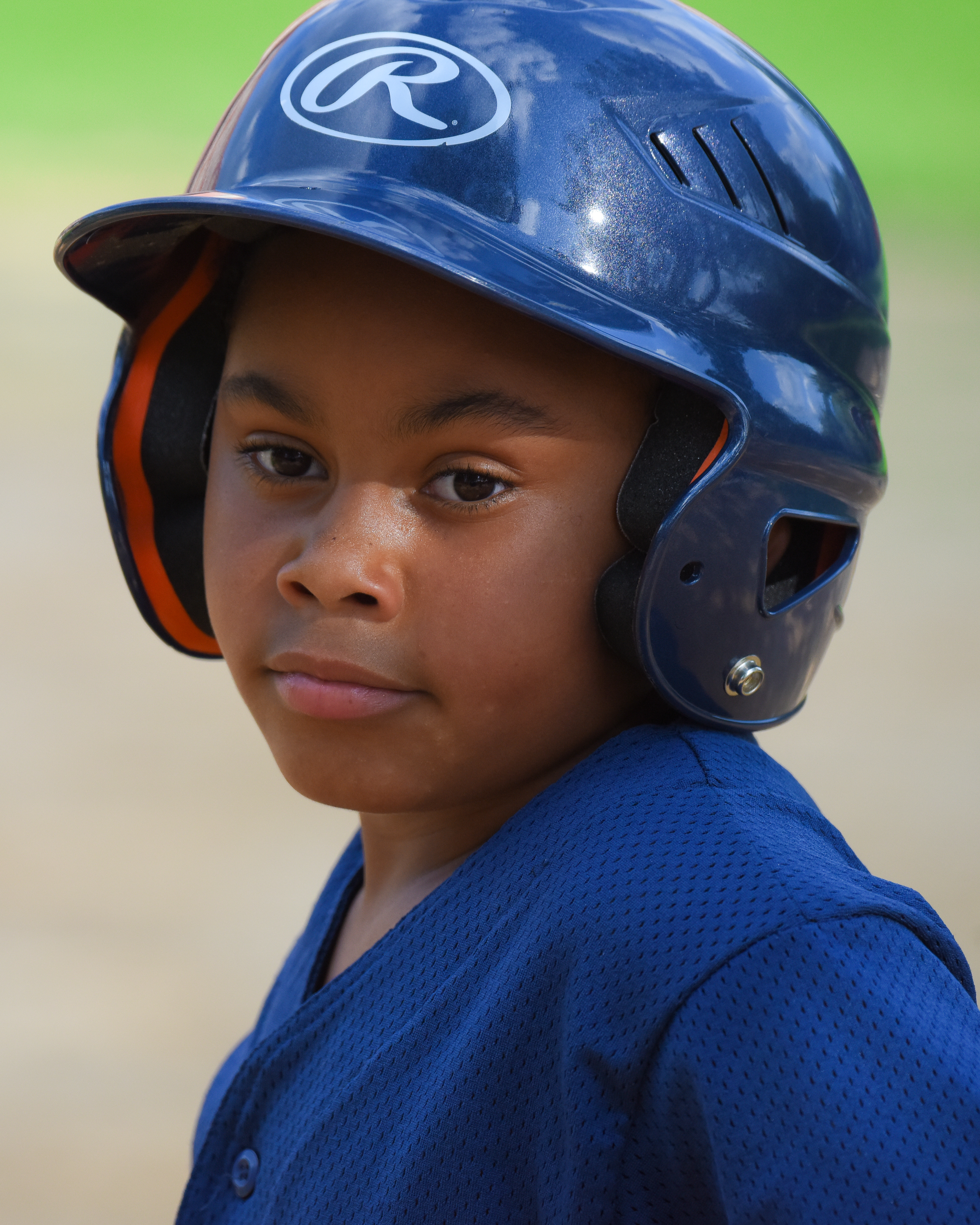
Double ear flap youth batting helmet, 2015

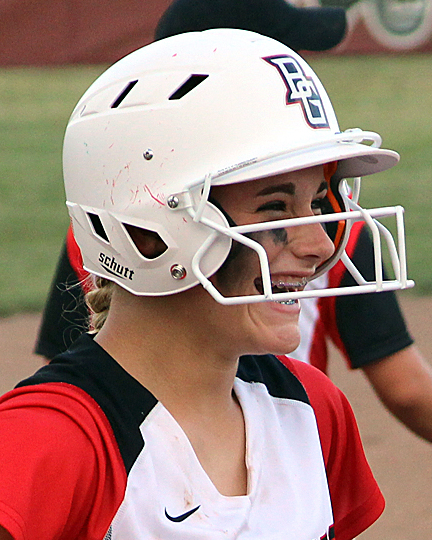
Softball batting helmet with face mask, 2016

A batting helmet is worn by batters in the game of baseball or softball. It is meant to protect the batter's head from errant pitches thrown by the pitcher. A batter who is "hit by pitch," due to an inadvertent wild pitch or by intent, may be seriously, even fatally, injured.

== Early concepts (1905–1920s) ==
In 1905, Mogridge created the first crude protective headgear and was granted patent No. 780899 for a "head protector." This first attempt at a batting helmet was said to look like an "inflatable boxing glove that wrapped around the hitters head." Roger Bresnahan, Hall of Fame catcher who was injured after being struck in the head with a pitch, developed a leather batting helmet in 1908 which he began using. These were not so much helmets as protective earmuffs. They did not protect the batter's head but rather protected the ear and temple region. He also developed an aluminum protector for the back of the head that was covered in fake hair, but it is unknown whether it was used in the field.

In 1908, Chicago White Sox shortstop Freddy Parent wore a head protector of some sort and Chicago Cubs' first baseman-manager Frank Chance did the same thing in 1913, though Chance's headgear was "little more than a sponge wrapped in a bandage." In 1914, minor leaguer Joe Bosk, playing for the Utica Utes, wore a protector after being severely injured when he was struck in the head by a pitch in 1911.

Despite the fatal beaning of Ray Chapman in 1920, protective headgear was still used only rarely in the major leagues. That year, a syndicated news article claimed several baseball executives—including New York Giants secretary Frank McQuade—were trying to mandate the use of batting helmets. The article also asserted helmets were unpopular among players. The first known case of a manager issuing head protectors to his players on a large scale was Philadelphia Phillies' manager Pat Moran who gave cork-cushioned hats to his players in 1921. Connie Mack, manager of the Philadelphia Athletics, voiced his support for protective headgear in 1921.

== Revived interest (1930s–1950s) ==
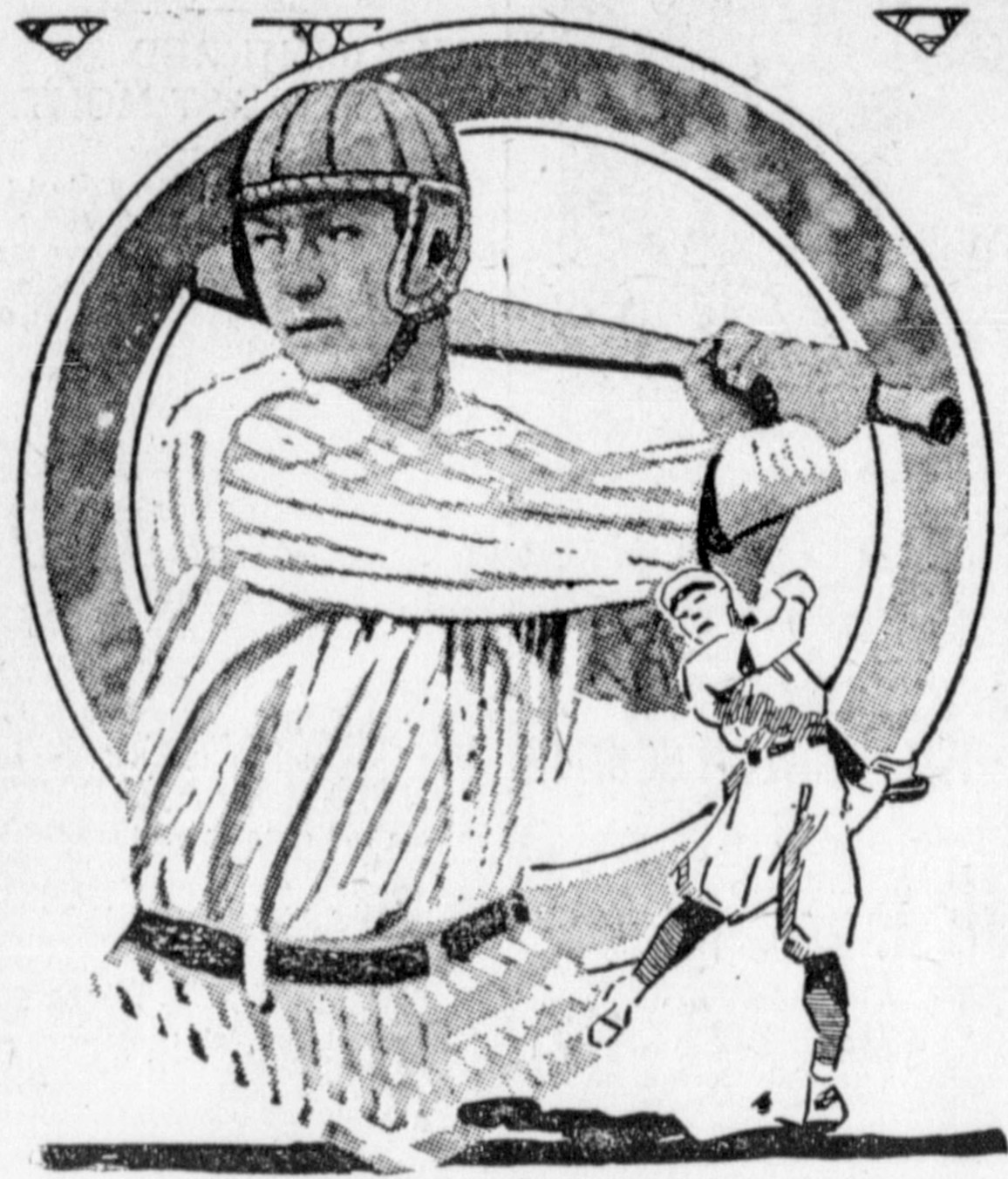
A concept drawing of a batting helmet from 1920. That year, MLB player Ray Chapman had been fatally struck in the head by a pitch.

In 1936, Willie Wells, a Negro leagues player, was knocked unconscious with a pitch to the temple. Disregarding the doctor's advice to sit out, Wells wore a modified construction hard hat as protective gear in a game the next day.

After Mickey Cochrane, a Hall of Fame catcher for the Detroit Tigers, suffered a career-ending and near-fatal skull fracture on May 25, 1937, on a pitch by New York Yankees' pitcher Bump Hadley, there was a strong call for batter helmets. Cochrane himself went on record saying that players should "absolutely" be required to wear protective helmets.

Only one week after Cochrane's injury, on June 1, 1937, the Cleveland Indians and Philadelphia Athletics became the first teams to test helmets, using leather and polo helmets respectively. Managers of both teams decided to use batting practice as a test run for helmet use on their players, before a game between the two teams. Though there is picture evidence of the polo helmets being worn in batting practice, there is no evidence of their being used or worn in a game. The first documented team to wear helmets in a game was the Des Moines Demons of the Western League. They also used polo helmets but the idea did not stick, as they only wore the helmets for one game.

The first professional baseball league to fully adopt the baseball helmet was the International League, which did so in 1939 when the list of official equipment used began to include a "safety cap or helmet". Buster Mills was the first player in the league to use a helmet.

The idea of requiring helmets in Major League Baseball was discussed by officials of the National League in a meeting at the 1940 MLB All-Star Game in Chicago. Ford Frick, president of the National League, showed the helmet he designed with hopes the league would adopt it. Frick told the Associated Press, "[A batting helmet] is the only way I know that we can prevent head injuries and the only way we can make the players wear them is make it a league rule." Though the National League at this meeting did not adopt it, Jackie Hayes became the first player to wear the helmet in a game on August 22, 1940.

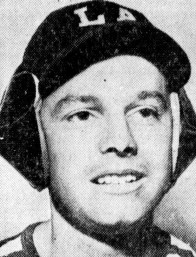
Los Angeles sportswriter Bob Hunter modeling a new baseball helmet in 1939. The helmet's design is similar to earmuffs and fits over the baseball cap.

In 1941, the National League adopted the use of a helmet designed by George Bennett, a Johns Hopkins University brain surgeon, for use by all teams in spring training. On March 8, 1941, the Brooklyn Dodgers announced that the team's players would wear the helmets during regular season games. On April 26, 1941, the Washington Senators joined the Dodgers as the only two teams to fully adopt the batting helmet for regular season use. The New York Giants on June 6 and the Chicago Cubs on June 24 also joined the list of teams to fully adopt the use of protective helmets during games.

Though many thought this would be the time when support would be strong enough to develop widespread usage, again tradition won out, and it was not until 1953 that the Pittsburgh Pirates mandated their players wear helmets. The helmet required by Pittsburgh general manager Branch Rickey (formerly the Dodgers general manager and president) was created by Charlie Muse based on the hard hats used by miners. Soon after, the Ottawa Citizen wrote that "Major League clubs are becoming quite interested in a new type of plastic protective cap which has been put on the market recently." This became even more prevalent when on August 1, 1954, Joe Adcock, a first baseman for the Milwaukee Braves, was struck with a pitch on his head. He was wearing a helmet and, though he was taken off the field by stretcher, he was uninjured as his helmet took the brunt of the impact and was visibly dented.

In the early 1950s, the governing body of Little League Baseball mandated the use of protective headgear during games for all players. In 1956 the National League followed suit and required the use of batting helmets by all players on all teams. After Little League Baseball announced a better helmet for the use of all players, the American League passed a rule on March 1, 1958, requiring all players to wear helmets. However, unlike in the National Hockey League (NHL) of the same era, helmets were widely accepted. It was not until December 1970 that Major League Baseball enforced strictly mandatory use of the batting helmet for all batters. Veteran players, however, were allowed to choose to wear a helmet or not, as they were grandfathered into the rule. The last Major League player to bat helmetless was Bob Montgomery, who last played for Boston Red Sox in 1979, coincidentally the same year the NHL finally made helmets compulsory with a similar grandfather clause for veteran players.

== Modifications (1960–2000) ==
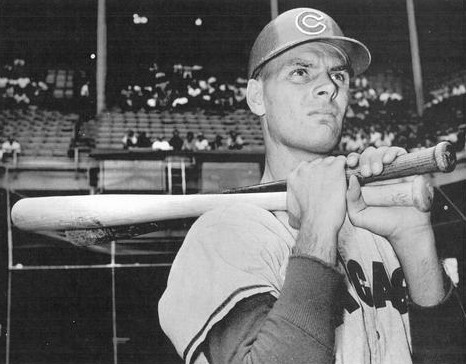
Chicago Cubs player Jerry Kindall is photographed in 1961 wearing a batting helmet.

In 1960, Jim Lemon became the first player to wear the new Little League helmet in a Major League game. These helmets were made with earflaps on both sides and were capable of withstanding a ball traveling at up to 120 miles per hour (190 km/h). One month later, Jimmy Piersall became the second player to wear the helmet in the Major Leagues.

With the helmet being worn league wide in Major League Baseball, alterations began in 1961.

On July 23, 1961, catcher Earl Battey was hit in the face with a pitch, fracturing a bone, and 10 days later returned to the field with a makeshift earflap to protect the injured area, though he only wore it for one game because he complained of difficulty seeing while wearing it. Tony Oliva also wore a makeshift face protector during batting practice, as did the Twins' Jimmie Hall in the 1965 World Series.

In 1964, the Phillies' Tony González was the first to wear a batting helmet with a pre-molded earflap. Prior to this, earflaps had been improvised. González was in the league top-ten in hit by pitches and the special helmet was constructed for his use. Shortly after this, Major League Baseball adopted the use of a helmet with a pre-molded earflap.

Ron Santo was also an early pioneer of wearing earflap helmets at the major league level, upon returning to action after having his left cheekbone fractured by a pitch in 1966. Although helmets with earflaps were common at the amateur levels in baseball, they were slow to gain popularity at the professional level. Some batters felt that seeing the earflap out of the corner of an eye was distracting. Tony Conigliaro was wearing a helmet without an earflap when he was seriously injured by a pitch in August 1967.

During the 1970 season, Brooks Robinson began using a batting helmet with an ear flap. He found the helmet's brim in addition to the earflap limited his visibility so he took a hacksaw and removed most of the brim. Robinson would wear the modified helmet for the remainder of his career.

Robert Crow was a plastic and reconstructive surgeon working for the Atlanta Braves in the 1970s when he invented a device that could protect players who were coming back from facial injuries. He called it a "C-Flap" after his last name and what it protected — the cheek. The device could be attached to the ear flap of the standard helmet to offer the added protection. The device did not become mainstream until decades later and in the meantime, players tried various things for the same purpose. For example, in 1978, the Pirates Dave Parker wore a hockey mask at the plate after he broke his cheek and jaw bones in a collision at home plate. This lasted only one game and Parker then tried to use a helmet with an attached two-bar football facemask. He also tried a helmet with another football facemask, the Dungard 210 facemask, screwed into his helmet.

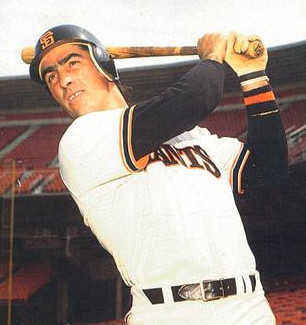
Jack Clark of the San Francisco Giants is photographed in 1983. That year, the MLB made it mandatory for batters to wear at least one ear protector on their batting helmet, like the one Clark is wearing.

Other notable players to utilize non-C-flap modified batting helmet include Gary Roenicke (1979), Ellis Valentine (1980), Charlie Hayes (1994), and Otis Nixon (1998). The first known player to wear the C-flap was Oakland A's catcher Terry Steinbach after breaking an orbital bone due to a freak pregame accident in May 1988. Steinbach had facial surgery and returned to action about a month later wearing a C-Flap. Other players would follow C-flap utilization, including David Justice, Kevin Seitzer, Mike Devereaux, Marlon Byrd, Chase Headley, and Jason Heyward. Heyward was the first player to begin wearing the C-flap permanently (2013) after enduring a facial injury, and Yadier Molina (2016) was the first player to begin permanently wearing the C-flap to prevent a facial injury where he had not previously had one.

In 1979, after taking a pitch to the face that required 25 stitches, Baltimore Orioles player Gary Roenicke wore a modified helmet with the facemask of a football helmet attached. According to Roenicke, the Orioles trainers took the face mask from the helmet of Baltimore Colts quarterback Bert Jones and affixed to the batting helmet. Roenicke wore the modified helmet until 1981.

In 1983, it was made mandatory for new players to use a helmet with at least one earflap. Players who were grandfathered in could choose to wear a helmet without ear flaps, if they so desired. Players can choose to wear double earflap helmets in the major leagues; however, this is not mandatory. Tim Raines was the last player to wear a helmet without earflaps, during the 2002 season. His flap-less Florida Marlins helmet is currently at the Baseball Hall of Fame. Gary Gaetti, who retired in the year 2000, plus Ozzie Smith and Tim Wallach, who both retired in 1996, also wore flapless helmets until they retired. Julio Franco, who retired from baseball in May 2008, was the last active player eligible to wear a helmet without flaps, but he chose to wear a helmet with an earflap throughout his career. Some players, mostly switch hitters, also decide to wear double earflap helmets while batting. Players to do this include Willie McGee, Terry Pendleton, Vince Coleman, Mark Bellhorn, Shane Victorino, Orlando Hudson, and Jed Lowrie (all of whom are switch hitters).

== Recent developments (2000–present) ==
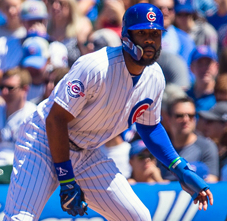
Jason Heyward wears a helmet with a protective guard during a 2016 game. Heyward started wearing the guard after being hit by a pitch in his face, which caused him to suffer a broken jaw.

On April 8, 2004, celebrated as "Hank Aaron Day" in Atlanta because it is the 30th anniversary of Hank Aaron's record-breaking 715th home run, Braves shortstop Rafael Furcal came to the plate in the sixth inning with a helmet without an earflap, as a tribute to Hank Aaron, who played his entire career in the 1950s, 1960s, and 1970s, and therefore did not wear a helmet with an earflap during his playing career. Umpire Bill Welke made him get one with a flap.

In 2005, Major League Baseball tested a new batting helmet for the first time in nearly three decades. At the All-Star Game in Detroit, players were seen wearing a new "molded crown" helmet that featured side vents, back vents and larger ear holes. The majority of players now wear these new helmets but some including Ryan Howard stayed with the older style.

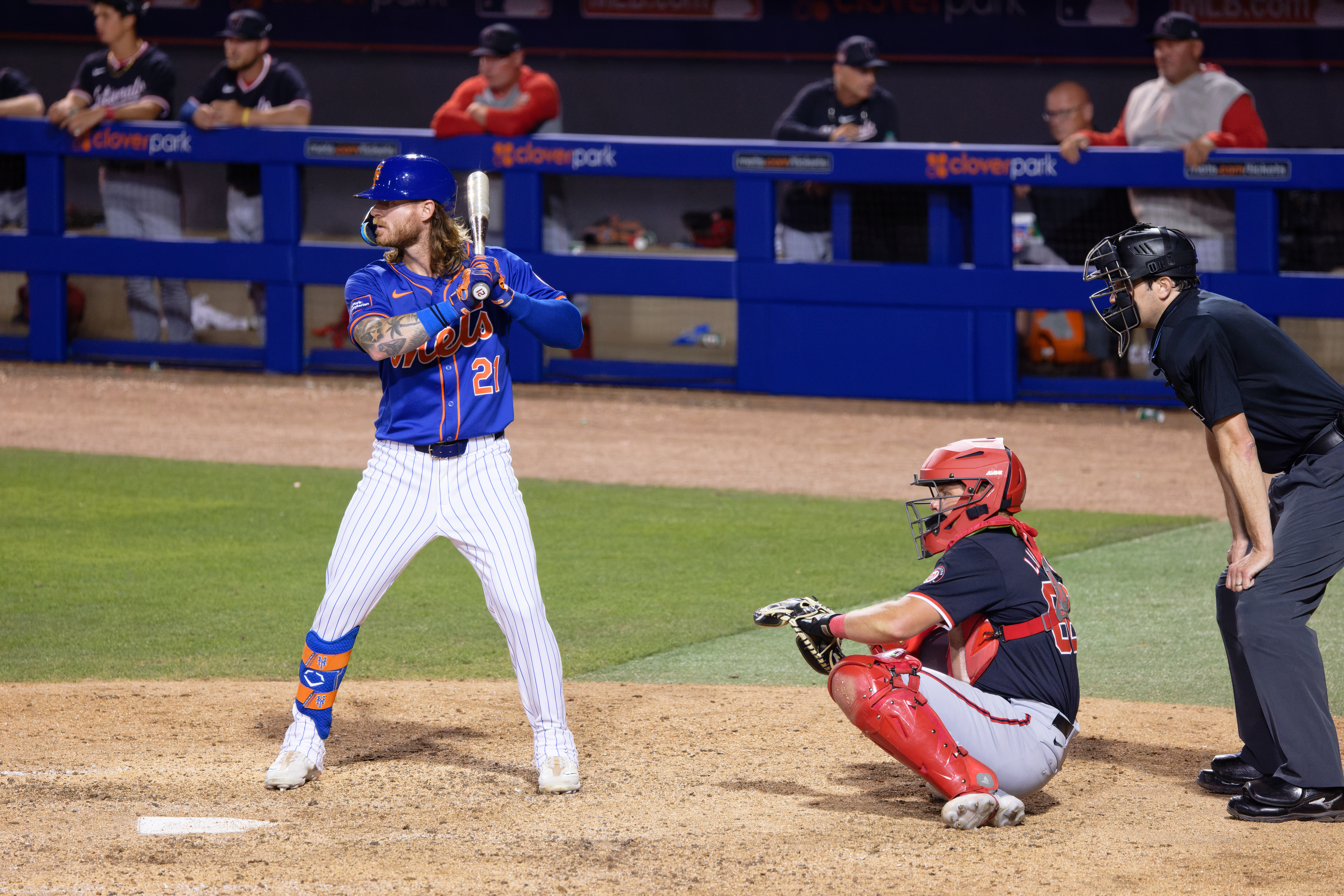
Major League Umpire John Tumpane wearing a helmet while he's behind home plate in 2024.

The no-flap helmet is still utilized in baseball. Catchers often wear a flapless helmet along with a facemask to protect the head when receiving pitches. Occasionally, players other than catchers will wear a batting helmet without earflaps while playing a defensive position in the field. This is usually done by a player who has a higher-than-normal risk of head injury. One example is former major-league player John Olerud, who started doing so after undergoing emergency surgery for a cerebral aneurysm while attending Washington State University. An earlier example was Dick Allen, who decided to wear a helmet in the field after at least one incident of being hit by objects thrown by fans. Umpires across Major League Baseball have opted to wear a flapless helmet under their traditional face mask instead of switching to the hockey-style mask worn by a few other umpires. Such practice began when umpires Mike Estabrook and John Tumpane opted to use a black helmet with their face mask while they were behind the plate.

Major League bat-boys/bat-girls and ball boys/ball girls are required to wear a helmet rather than a cap while performing their duties while on the field of play. They are allowed to use the no-flap helmet for this purpose, and many do.

Following the 2007 death of Tulsa Drillers first base coach Mike Coolbaugh after being hit by a batted ball, there has been debate as to whether base coaches should wear helmets. Following the incident, the Oakland Athletics' Rene Lachemann decided to wear a helmet out to his third base coaching position.

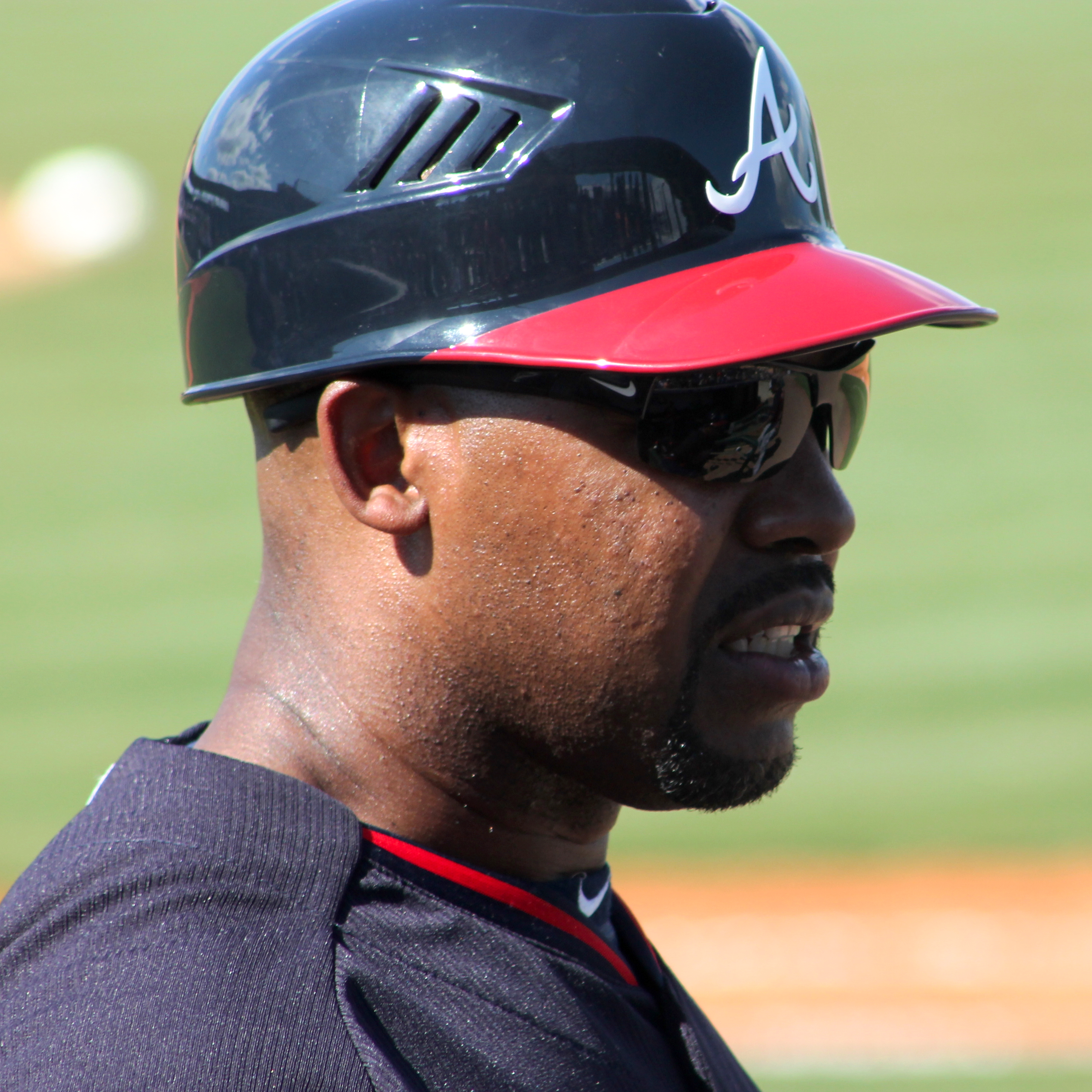
In 2008, it was made mandatory for on-field MLB coaches to wear helmets. Bo Porter, former coach for the Atlanta Braves, is photographed with an on-field helmet in 2015.

After the 2007 season, Major League Baseball made it mandatory for coaches to wear helmets beginning with the 2008 season, although some coaches, such as the Los Angeles Dodgers' Larry Bowa, have disagreed with the decision.

In 2009, Major League Baseball decided to take action and protect players from the increasing number of concussions and head injuries. Rawlings came out with the S100 baseball helmet, named for its impact capabilities. It was able to withstand the impact of a baseball traveling at 100 miles per hour (160 km/h) from 2 feet (0.6 m) away. The other baseball helmets used are only required to withstand a 70 miles per hour (110 km/h) impact from 2 feet (0.6 m) away. The first Major League Player to wear this helmet during a game was Canadian-born Ryan Dempster, a pitcher with the Chicago Cubs. The new helmet did not catch on because the players said it made them look like bobbleheads. Some players, including Mets third baseman David Wright, did decide to use the helmet while batting.

In 2013, per the new MLB-MLBPA Collective Bargaining Agreement, MLB players were required to wear the new Rawlings S100 Pro Comp.

Throughout his career from 2000 to 2013, Juan Pierre wore a cap underneath his helmet while batting and baserunning. He is often recognized as the last player to do so, as it went out of style when the league added earflaps to helmets.

In 2018, several Major League Baseball players including Mike Trout and Bryce Harper began wearing the C-flap, an attachment to the earflap covering the jaw, invented by Markwort. The C-flap has caught on quickly throughout Major League Baseball and now batting helmet manufacturers such as Rawlings and Easton have begun producing helmets with a built-in earflap extension emulating the C-flap.

On May 28, 2018, Philadelphia Phillies slugger Rhys Hoskins fractured his jaw when he fouled a ball off his own face against the Los Angeles Dodgers. Hoskins, 25, was given a choice: miss four to six weeks or return after 10 days on the disabled list with a C-Flap on both sides for complete armament. Hoskins opted to return early with the double-C-Flap look, and just 12 days later, Hoskins made his return from the disabled list.

Currently, all leagues up to and including Minor League Baseball require the use of a double earflap batting helmet, with certain state amateur leagues being one exception (e.g., South Dakota Amateur Baseball Association). In Major League Baseball, however, only one earflap is required (for the ear closest to the pitcher).

Batting helmet variations

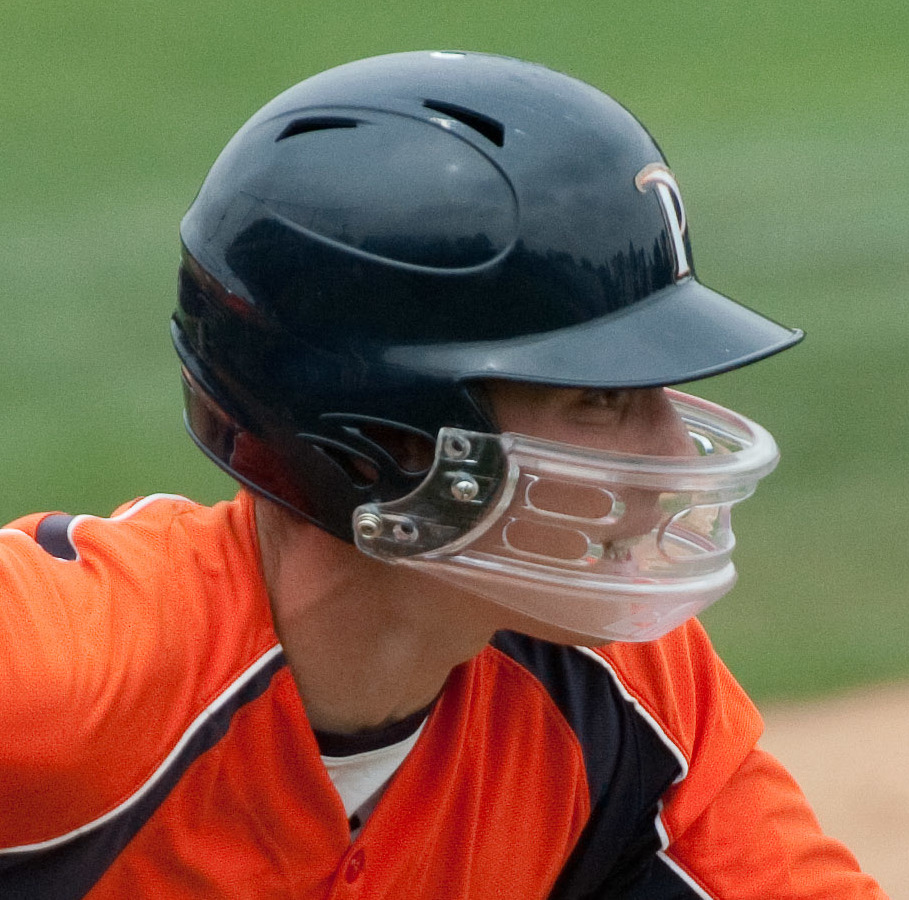
Zach Vincej with a clear facemask on his batting helmet, 2010

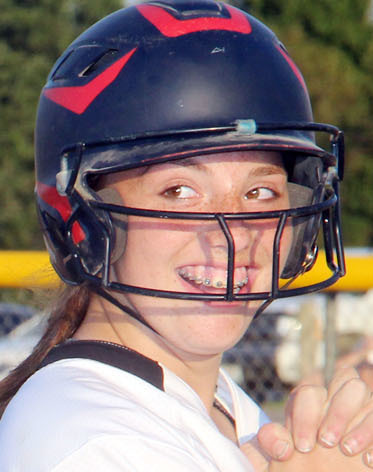
A youth softball helmet with a face mask, 2016

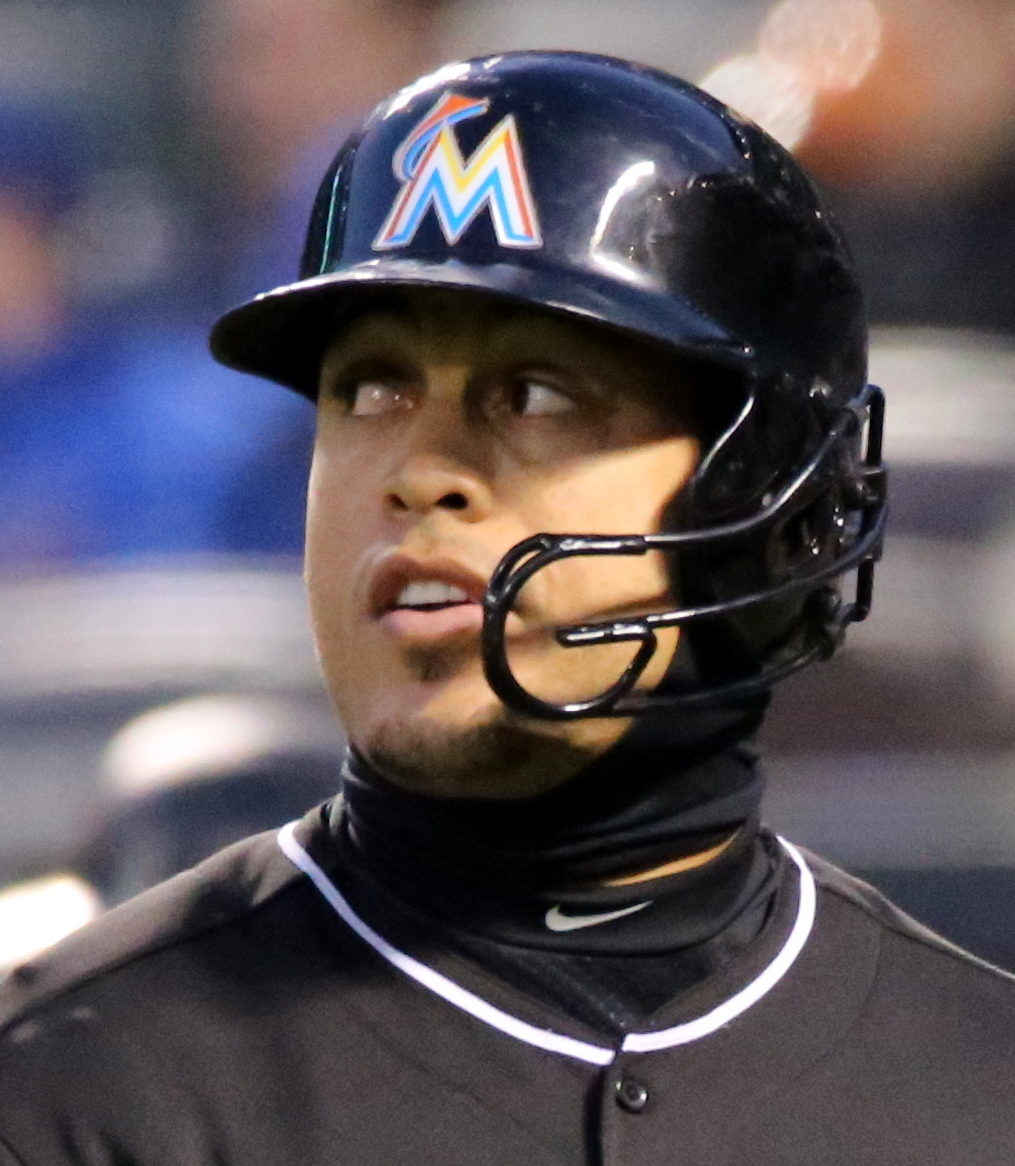
In 2016, Giancarlo Stanton wore a batting helmet with a wire facemask.

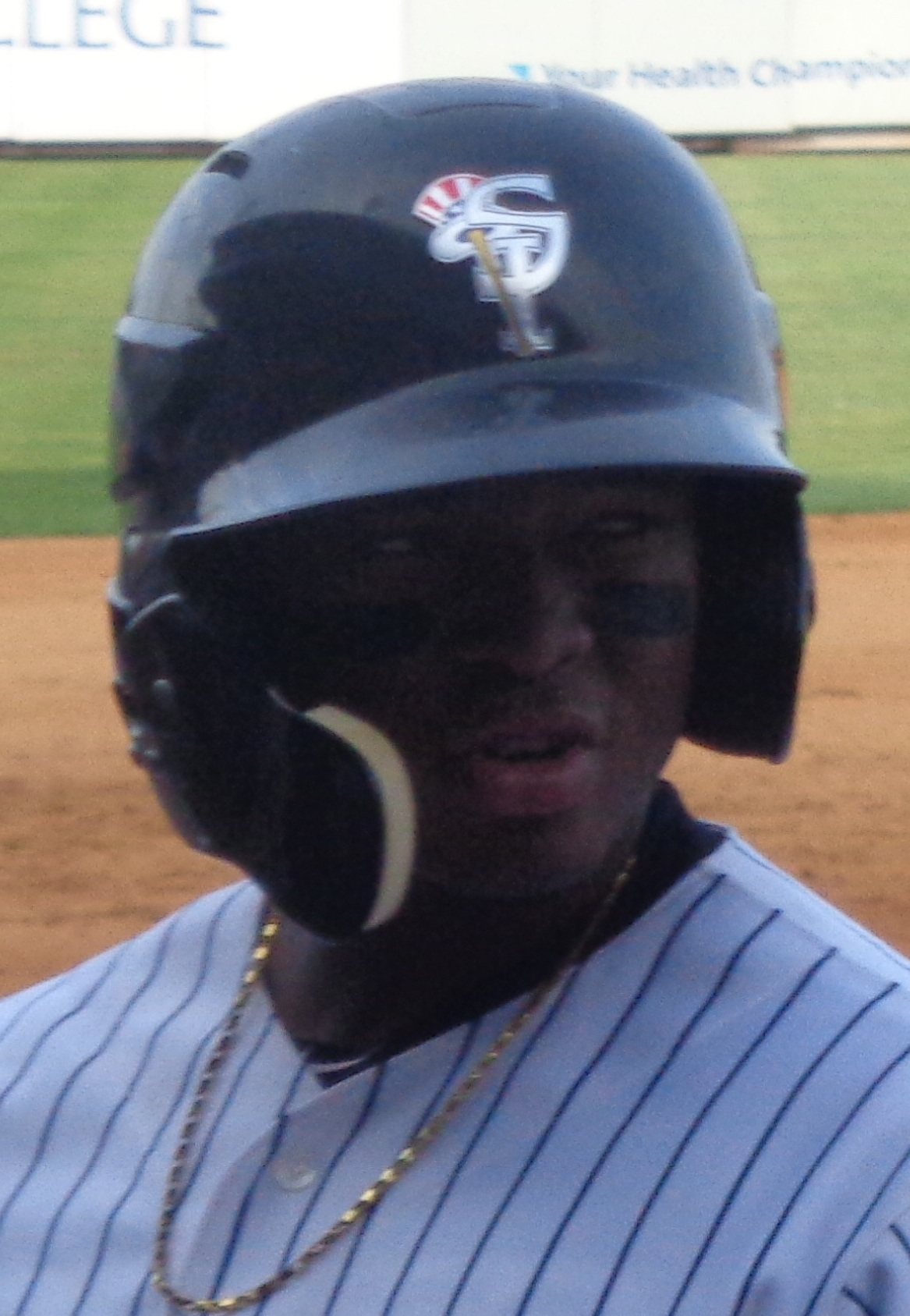
Cesar Diaz in a standard Minor League Baseball batting helmet, 2017

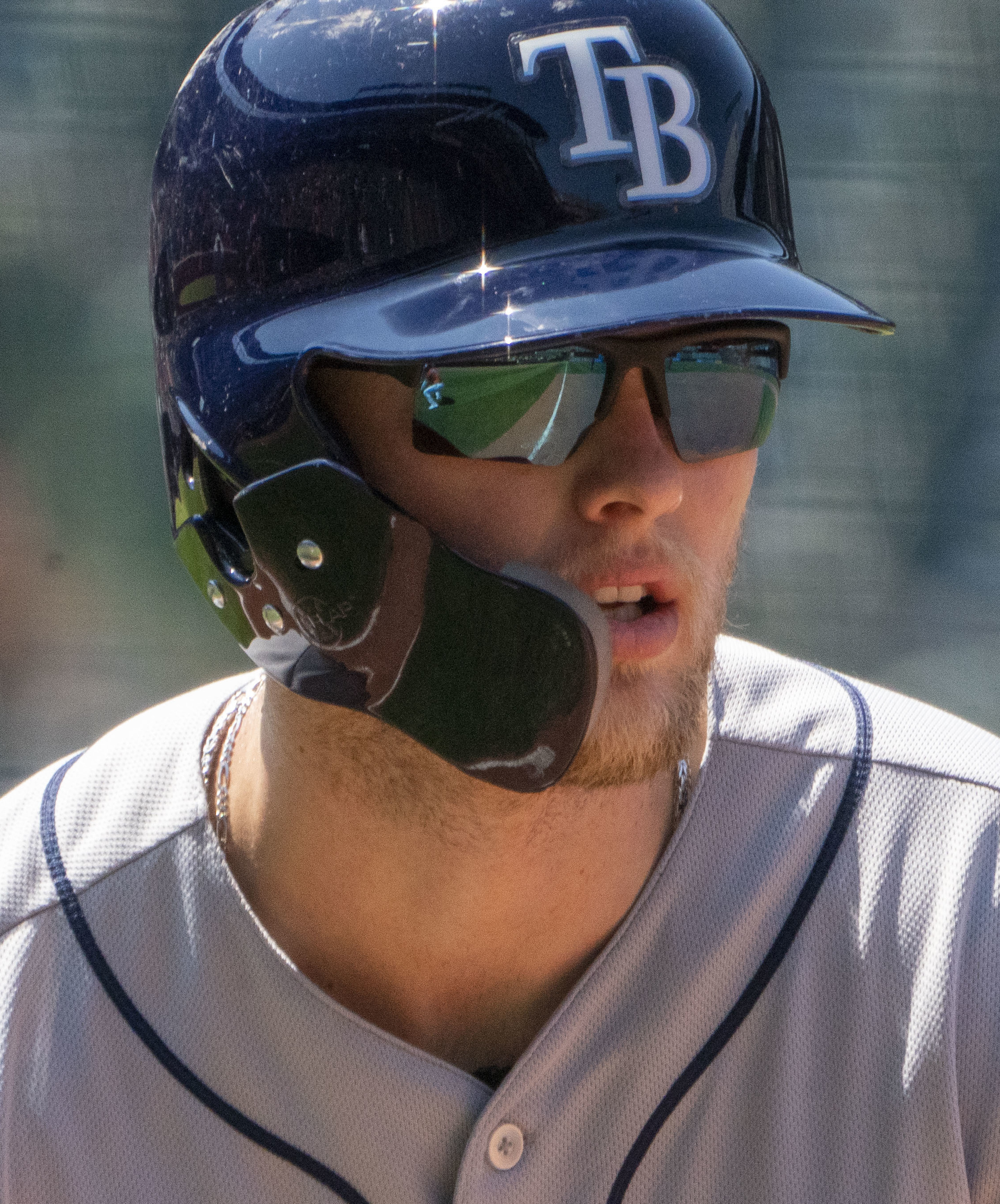
Austin Meadows wearing a standard MLB batting helmet with a face protector, 2019

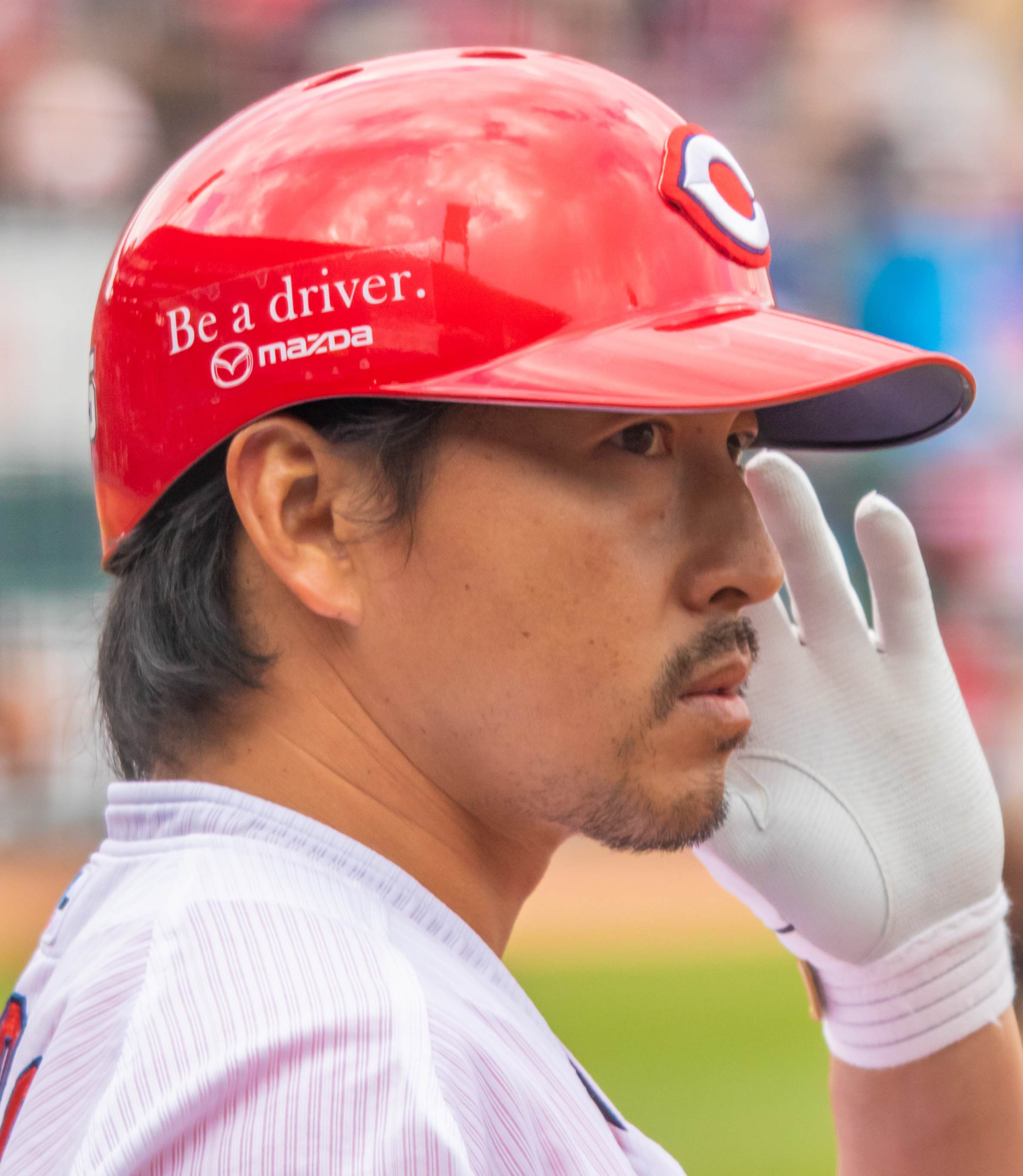
Hisayoshi Chōno wearing a standard NPB batting helmet, 2019

== See also ==
- Baseball clothing and equipment
