= Marucci =

Marucci is a surname. Notable people with the surname include:

- Buddy Marucci (born 1952), American businessman and amateur golfer
- Leone Marucci (born 1973), American filmmaker
- Mat Marucci (born 1945), American jazz drummer, composer, author, educator, and clinician

== See also ==
- Marucci Sports, a maker of baseball bats owned by Fox Factory
