= Akadema =

American sporting goods manufacturing company

- Type: Privately held company
- Industry: Sports goods
- Founded: 1997; 29 years ago
- Founders: Joseph (Joe) Gilligan and Lawrence Gilligan
- Headquarters: Hohokus, New Jersey, United States
- Area served: United States
- Products: Baseball gloves
- Number of employees: 22 (2025)
- Website: akademapro.com

Akadema is an American sporting goods manufacturing company located in Hawthorne, New Jersey, United States. The company was founded by brothers, Joseph and Lawrence Gilligan of Ringwood, New Jersey Lawrence was a former Minor League player for the St. Louis Cardinals. The company specializes in manufacturing baseball gloves.

== History ==
The first series of gloves were released in 1998 under the name "Academy". In 2000 the company experienced rapid growth when it changed its name to Akadema, moved into the old Yoo-hoo factory in Garfield, NJ, and released the patented Reptilian Glove. Akadema signed Ozzie Smith as the company spokesman and then Anthony Telford and Clay Bellinger became the first Major League Players endorsing Akadema. Kris Totten (a former Minor League player for the Seattle Mariners) joined the firm to head up sales.

Akadema began as a startup focused on creating innovative baseball equipment, particularly gloves. The company was created by the Joe and Lawerence Gilligan in 1997. The idea of designing a glove that differed from traditional gloves came from Lawerence Gilligan during his professional baseball career. Their early business designs involved alternate glove designs for position players.

The company would follow up the Reptilian with the Claw, The Funnel and Spiral Lock, Tacktion Grip, The Hot Hands and the UFO Mitt to continue the companies first decade in creative sports design. The most popular of the patented glove however has been the Praying Mantis Mitt which was created with input from Gary Carter.

Akadema used feedback from professional baseball players in the development of their equipment. Working with players allowed the company to explore alternate glove designs and find out what was worked and what needed. These collaborations contributed to the development of many specialized products.

In 2002, the reptilian glove was thought of as one of the innovative baseball gloves since Wilson introduced the A2000 in 1957. The gloves design connected the fingers and opened near the fingertips which created a different catching surface compared to traditional gloves . The idea behind the design was that the different surface would allow fielders to handle and then transfer the ball to the throwing hand easier. Since then, the company has introduced additional designs based on its concept.

The company crossed over into popular culture when their products appeared in Adam Sandler films such as Click, Benchwarmers and the Billy Bob Thornton remake of Bad News Bears. Akadema also has been a sponsor of Spike TV programs "Pros vs Joes" and "DEA" second season.

== Sponsorship ==
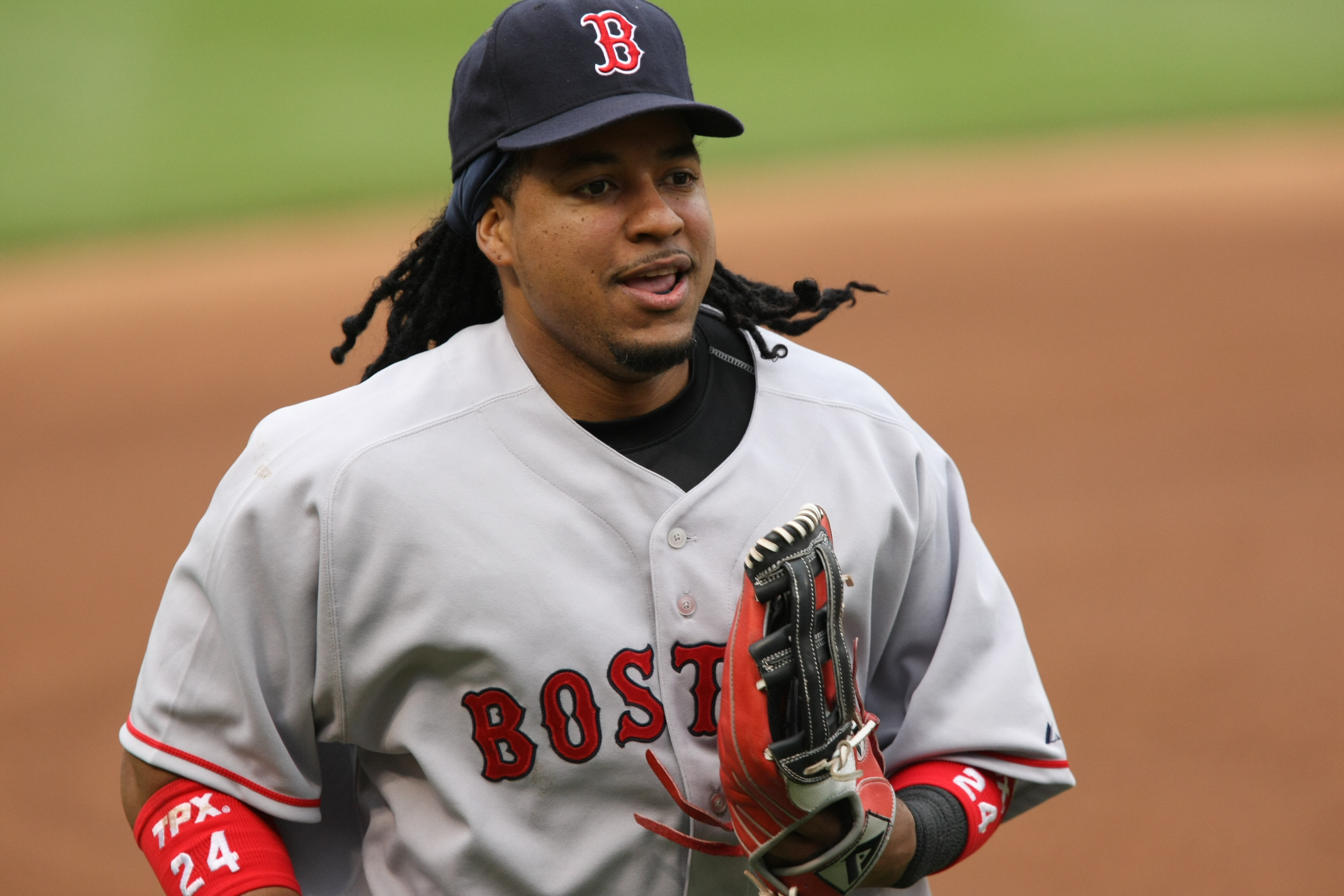
Manny Ramirez wearing an Akadema glove with the Red Sox.

In 2001, Akadema signed Major League Baseball star shortstop Ozzie Smith as an official endorser of it's reptilian glove. Smith's involvement helped bring attention to the company as they continued to establish themselves. In the years that followed, Akadema's most notable endorsement deals have been the signing of Manny Ramirez from 2004 to 2011 and a five-year deal with future star Bryce Harper. Shane Victorino has won three Gold Glove Award trophies since signing on with Akadema. Akadema's other current endorsements are with: Bobby Jenks, Brandon Moss, Jose Veras, Tim Redding, Mark Melancon, Vin Mazzaro, Ross Ohlendorf, Vicente Padilla, Brandon McCarthy, Darnell McDonald, Derek Holland, Willie Eyre, Cameron Maybin, and Craig Breslow. Akadema also became strong within the women's fast pitch market. They have sponsored Crystl Bustos 2000-2010 and Monica Abbott of Team USA 2008-2010 and are an official supplier to USA softball Olympic team and the National Pro Fast Pitch League.

As the pro ranks grew, the Akadema brand spread quickly and became very popular among Minor League and college level players.

In addition to modern gloves, Akadema introduced the Hoboken Collection, a vintage line of equipment that had been used by Babe Ruth, Lou Gehrig, Bob Feller, Dazzy Vance, Mickey Cochrane and Yogi Berra. Akadema quickly gained rights to Ken-Wel and Reach companies trademarks.

== Manufacturing ==
Akadema started manufacturing through suppliers overseas but unlike most manufacturers of the day, Akadema has brought some manufacturing in house to the USA.

Akadema started its own wood baseball bat shop and can customize a bat.

In 2008 the company purchased an industrial building and consolidated its operations under one roof in Hawthorne, NJ. According to Inc. magazine, 2007 sales were 4.8 million. Current sales are said to be around seven million.

In 2010, the company opened its own embroidery shop. That same year the company started its own baseball glove shop making it one of the few companies that still makes wood bats, metal bats and gloves in the USA.
