= Baseball bat =

Piece of sports equipment

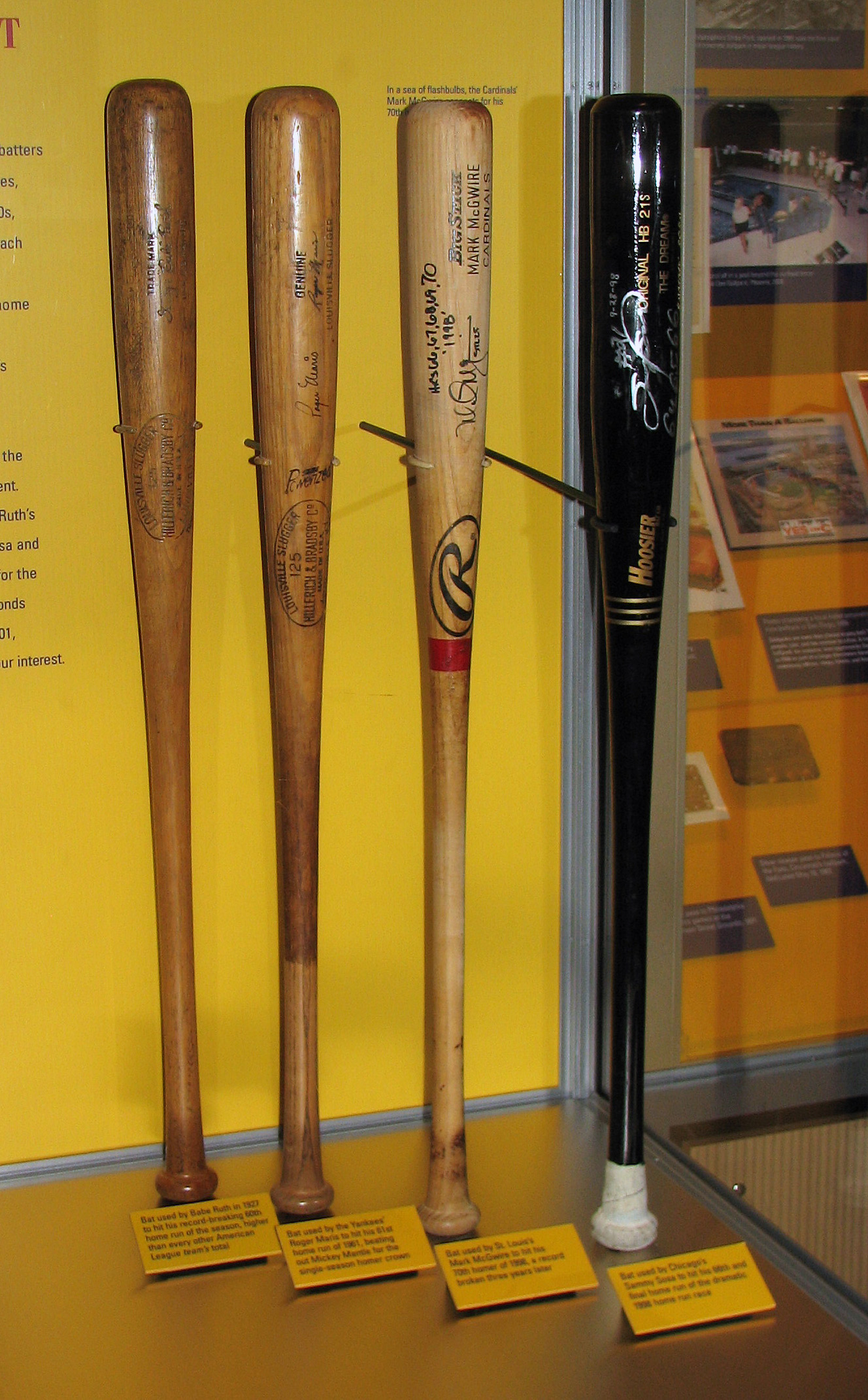
Four historically significant baseball bats showcased in the National Baseball Hall of Fame's traveling exhibit "Baseball As America". From left to right: bat used by Babe Ruth to hit his 60th home run during the 1927 season, bat used by Roger Maris to hit his 61st home run during the 1961 season, bat used by Mark McGwire to hit his 70th home run during the 1998 season, and the bat used by Sammy Sosa for his 66th home run during the same season.

A baseball bat is a smooth wooden or metal club used in the sport of baseball to hit the ball after it is thrown by the pitcher. By regulation it may be no more than 2.61 inches (6.6 cm) in diameter at the thickest part and no more than 42 inches (1.067 m) in length. Although historically bats approaching 3 pounds (1.4 kg) or 48 oz were used, modern bats of 33 ounces (0.94 kg) are common, topping out at 34 to 36 ounces (0.96 to 1.02 kg).

== Design ==
A baseball bat is divided into several regions. The "barrel" is the thick part of the bat, where it is meant to hit the ball. The part of the barrel best for hitting the ball, according to construction and swinging style, is often called the "sweet spot." The end of the barrel is called the "top", "end", or "cap" of the bat. Opposite the cap, the barrel narrows until it meets the "handle", which is comparatively thin, so that batters can comfortably grip the bat in their hands. Sometimes, especially on metal bats, the handle is wrapped with a rubber or tape "grip". Finally, below the handle is the "knob" of the bat, a wider piece that keeps the bat from slipping from a batter's hands.

The "bat drop" of a bat is its weight, in ounces, minus its length, in inches. For example, a 30-ounce, 33-inch-long bat has a bat drop of minus 3 (30 − 33 = −3). Larger bat drops help to increase swing speed, due to less mass per unit length; smaller drops create more power, due to greater momentum to transfer to the ball.

== History ==
The bat's form has become more refined over time. In the mid-19th century, baseball batters were known to shape or whittle their own bats by hand, which resulted in a wide range of shapes, sizes, and weights. For example, there were flat bats, round bats, short bats, and fat bats. Earlier bats were known to be much heavier and larger than modern regulated ones. During the 19th century, many experimental shapes and handle designs were tried. Modern bats are much more uniform in design.

=== Innovations ===
- On June 17, 1890, Emile Kinst received U.S. patent 430,388 the ball-bat, or banana bat. The bat is shaped with a curve, hence the name banana bat. The creator of the bat, Kinst wrote: "The object of my invention is to provide a ball-bat which shall produce a rotary or spinning motion of the ball in its flight to a higher degree than is possible with any present known form of ball-bat, and thus to make it more difficult to catch the ball, or if caught, to hold it, and thus further to modify the conditions of the game".
- The mushroom bat, made in 1906 by Spalding. With baseball bats being larger in the 1900s the Spalding company designed a larger bat with a mushroom-shaped knob on the handle. This enabled the batter to get a better distribution of weight over the entire length of the bat.
- The Wright & Ditson Lajoie baseball bat. This bat had a normal size barrel but had two knobs on the handle. The lower knob was at the bottom of the handle and the other knob, also called the shoulder, was three inches above the lower knob. This was designed to have better spacing between the hands due to the shoulder being in the middle of the grip. This also gave batters an advantage when they choked up on the bat, because the second knob provided a better grip.
- In 1990, Bruce Leinert came up with the idea of putting an axe handle on a baseball bat. He filed a patent application for the "Axe Bat" in 2007 and the bat started being used in the college and pro ranks over the following years. In 2012, the Marietta College Pioneers baseball team won the NCAA Division III World Series using axe-handled bats. Several Major League Baseball players have adopted the bat handle including Mookie Betts, Dustin Pedroia, George Springer, Kurt Suzuki and Dansby Swanson.
- In 2025, the New York Yankees popularized a "torpedo bat" design, which was made to increase contact hitting. The widest diameter of the bat is lower down than on standard bats, making the bat look more like a bowling pin. The bat quickly generated media coverage as the Yankees hit a franchise record nine home runs in their second game, the first three home runs being hit on the first three pitches. MLB stated the new design was legal as it did not exceed the maximum allowed diameter of 2.61 inches (6.6 cm) nor technically go against anything stated in the rules. The "torpedo bat" was designed by Aaron Leanhardt, a field coordinator with the Miami Marlins. Leanhardt has a Ph.D. in physics from the Massachusetts Institute of Technology.
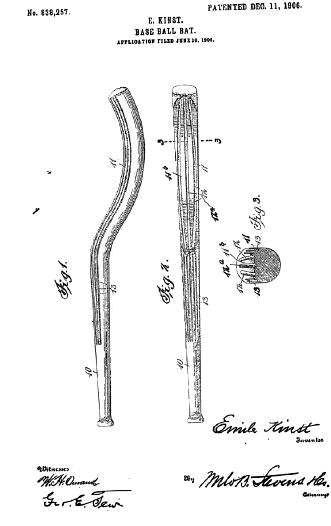
Patent No. 430,388 (June 17, 1890) awarded to Emile Kinst for an "improved ball-bat"

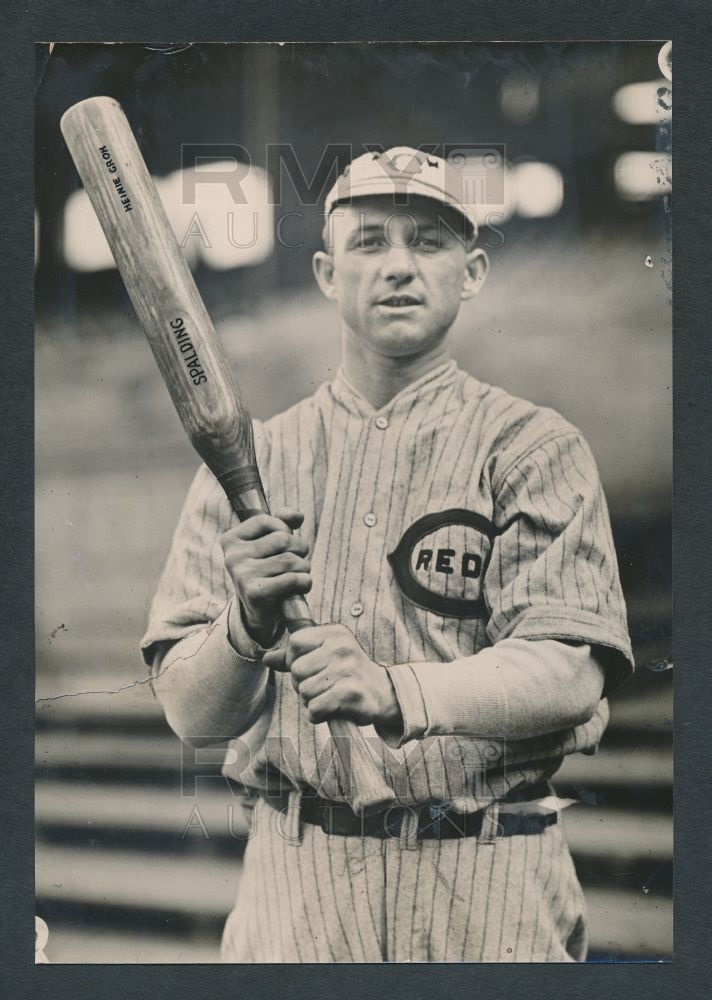
Heinie Groh and his signature "bottle bat"

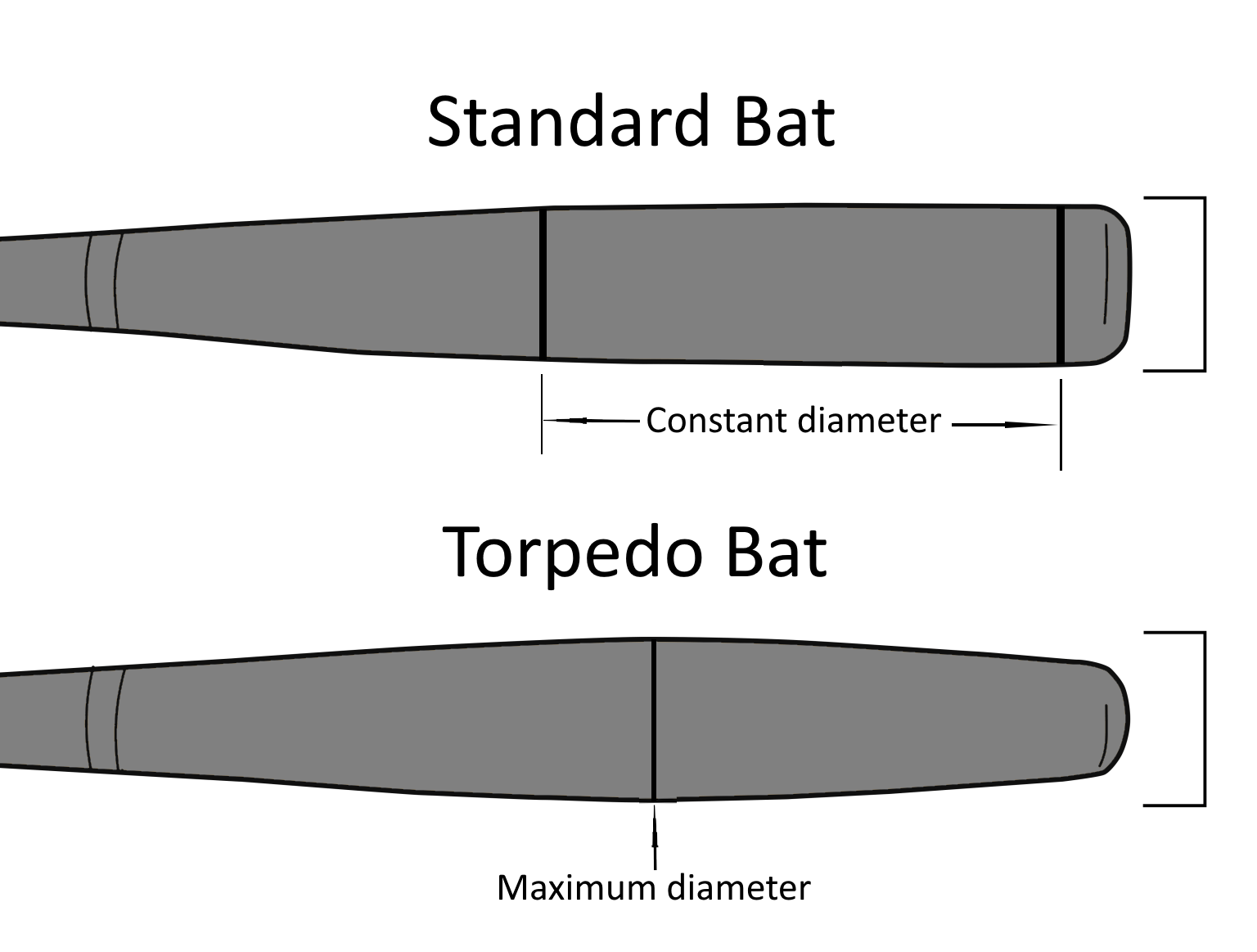
Diagram of a 'Torpedo bat'. The maximum diameter and the length of a torpedo bat are equal to the dimensions of a standard bat

== Materials and manufacture ==
Baseball bats are made of either hardwood or a metal alloy (typically aluminum). Most wooden bats are made from ash; other woods include maple, hickory, and bamboo. Hickory has fallen into disfavor over its greater weight, which slows down bat speed, while maple bats gained popularity following the introduction of the first MLB-sanctioned model in 1997. The first player to use one was Joe Carter of the Toronto Blue Jays. Barry Bonds used maple bats the seasons he broke baseball's single-season home run record in 2001, and the career home run record in 2007. In 2010, the increased tendency of maple bats to shatter caused Major League Baseball to examine their use, banning some models in minor league play.

Manufacturers position each bat's label over the mechanically weaker side of the wood. To reduce chance of fracture, and maybe deliver more energy to the ball, a bat is intended to be held so the label faces sky or ground when it strikes the ball during a horizontal swing. In this orientation, the bat is considered stiffer and less likely to break.

Different types of wood will fracture differently. For bats made of ash, labels will generally be where the grain spacing is widest. For maple bats they will usually be positioned where grain is tightest.

Maple bats in particular were once known (circa 2008) to potentially shatter in a way that resulted in many sharp edges, sometimes creating more dangerous projectiles when breaking. Maple bat manufacture evolved significantly, in cooperation with Major League Baseball, paying special attention to grain slope, and including an ink spot test to confirm safest wood grain orientation.

Based on consistent anecdotal reports of sales at sporting goods stores, and because of the Emerald ash borer epidemic, maple appears to be displacing ash as most popular new baseball bat material in the United States. Next and rising in popularity is bamboo, which has more isotropic fine grain, great strength, and less weight for a bat of any given size.

Within league standards there is ample latitude for individual variation, many batters settling on their own bat profile, or one used by a successful batter. Formerly, bats were hand-turned from a template with precise calibration points but more recently they are machine-turned to a fixed metal template. Historically significant templates may be kept in a bat manufacturers' vault; for example, Babe Ruth's template, which became popular among major-league players, is R43 in the Louisville Slugger archives. Ruth favored a thinner handle than was the norm in the 1920s, and his success caused most to follow. Ruth used an unusually large bat, which he reduced in size incrementally during his career. In 1920 he was using a 40-inch, 54-ounce bat, made of ash, with a slender handle. In 1928 he wrote, "A few seasons ago I used a 54 ounce bat, long and with the weight well at the end. Now I'm using a 46 ounce club--and each season when I have a new set of bats made, I have an addition ounce taken off."

Once the basic bat has been turned, it has the manufacturer's name, the serial number, and often the signature of the player endorsing it branded into it opposite the wood's best side. Honus Wagner was the first player to endorse and sign a bat. Next, most bats are given a rounded head, but some 30% of players prefer a "cup-balanced" head, in which a cup-shaped recess is made in the head, introduced to the major leagues in the early 1970s by José Cardenal; this lightens the bat and moves its center of gravity toward the handle. Finally, the bat is stained in one of several standard colors, including natural, red, black, and two-tone blue and white.

=== Environmental threat to ash wood ===
The emerald ash borer, an exotic beetle imported accidentally from Asia, has killed more than 50 million white ash trees in the eastern United States and in 2017 threatened groves in New York's Adirondack Mountains that are used to make baseball bats.

== Regulations ==
In the American major leagues, Rule 1.10(a) states:

The bat shall be a smooth, round stick not more than 2.61 inches in diameter at the thickest part and not more than 42 inches in length. The bat shall be one piece of solid wood.

Bats are not allowed to be hollowed or corked—that is, filled with an alien substance such as cork which reduces the weight. This corking is thought to increase bat speed without greatly reducing hitting power, though this idea was challenged as unlikely on the Discovery Channel series MythBusters.

Both wooden and metal alloy (generally aluminum) bats are generally permitted in amateur baseball. Metal alloy bats are generally regarded as being capable of hitting a ball faster and farther with the same power. However, increasing numbers of "wooden bat leagues" have emerged in recent years, reflecting a trend back to wood over safety concerns and, in the case of collegiate summer baseball wood-bat leagues, to better prepare players for the professional leagues that require wood bats. Metal alloy bats can send a ball towards an unprotected pitcher's head up to 60 ft 6 in (18.44 m) away at a velocity far too high for the pitcher to get out of the way in time. Some amateur baseball organizations enforce bat manufacturing and testing standards which attempt to limit maximum ball speed for wood and non-wood bats.

In high school baseball in the United States:

- The bat is not permitted to be more than 2 5/8 inches (67 mm) in diameter in proximity to width and length.
- Its "drop" (inches of length minus ounces of weight) must be no more than 3: for example, a 34-inch (863.6‑mm) bat must weigh at least 31 ounces (880 g).
- The bat may consist of any safe solid uniform material; the National Federation of State High School Associations rules state only "wood or non-wood" material.
- To be legally used in a game, an aluminum bat has to be a BBCOR (Batted Ball Coefficient of Restitution) bat because it has been determined that a pitcher loses the ability to protect himself when this ratio is exceeded.

In some 12-year-old-and-under youth leagues (such as Little League baseball), the bat may not be more than 2 1/4 inches (57 mm) in diameter. However, in many other leagues (like PONY League Baseball, and Cal Ripken League Baseball), the bat may not be more than 2 3/4 inches (70 mm) in diameter.

There are limitations to how much and where a baseball player may apply pine tar to a baseball bat. According to Rule 1.10(c) of the Major League Baseball Rulebook, it is not allowed more than 18 inches up from the bottom handle. An infamous example of the rule in execution is the Pine Tar Incident on July 24, 1983. Rules 1.10 and 6.06 were later changed to reflect the intent of Major League Baseball, as exemplified by the league president's ruling. Rule 1.10 now only requires that the bat be removed from the game if discovered after being used in a game; it no longer necessitates any change to the results of any play which may have taken place.

Rule 6.06 refers only to bats that are "altered or tampered with in such a way to improve the distance factor or cause an unusual reaction on the baseball. This includes, bats that are filled, flat-surfaced, nailed, hollowed, grooved or covered with a substance such as paraffin, wax, etc." It no longer makes any mention of an "illegally batted ball". In 2001, MLB approved the use of Gorilla Gold Grip Enhancer in major and minor league games as an alternative to pine tar.

== Care and maintenance ==
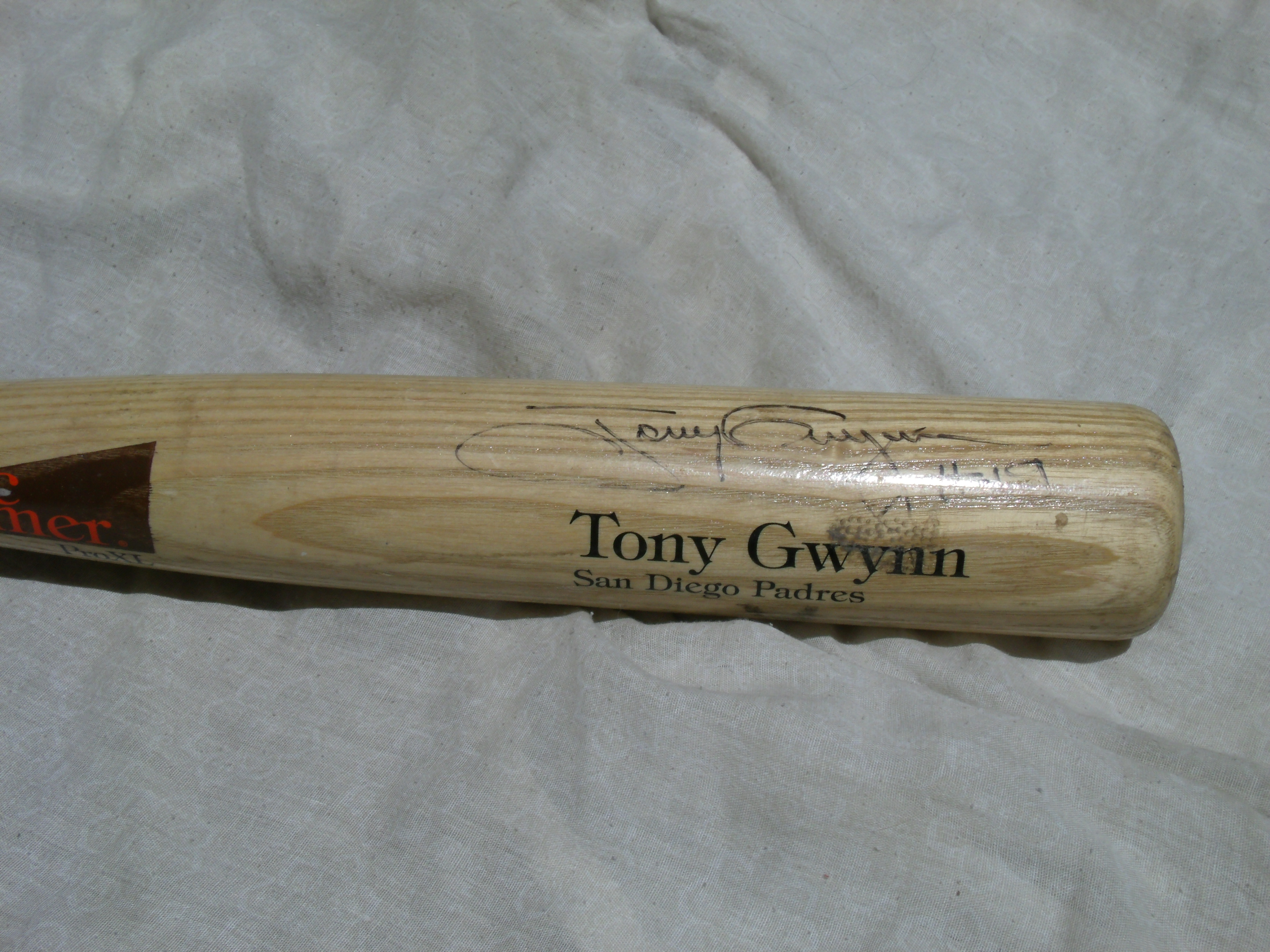
A Tony Gwynn game-used and autographed baseball bat

Players can be very particular about their bats. Ted Williams cleaned his bats with alcohol every night and periodically took them to the post office to weigh them. "Bats pick up condensation and dirt lying around on the ground," he wrote, "They can gain an ounce or more in a surprisingly short time." Ichiro Suzuki also took great care that his bats did not accumulate moisture and thus gain weight: he stored his bats in humidors, one in the club house and another, a portable one, for the road. Rod Carew fought moisture by storing his bats in a box full of sawdust in the warmest part of his house. "The sawdust acts as a buffer between the bats and the environment," he explained, "absorbing any moisture before it can seep into the wood."

Many players "bone" their bats, meaning that before games, they rub their bats repeatedly with a hard object, believing this closes the pores on the wood and hardens the bat. Animal bones are a popular boning material, but rolling pins, soda bottles and the edge of a porcelain sink have also been used. Pete Rose had his own way of hardening his bats: he soaked them in a tub of motor oil in his basement then hung them up to dry.

== Fungo bat ==
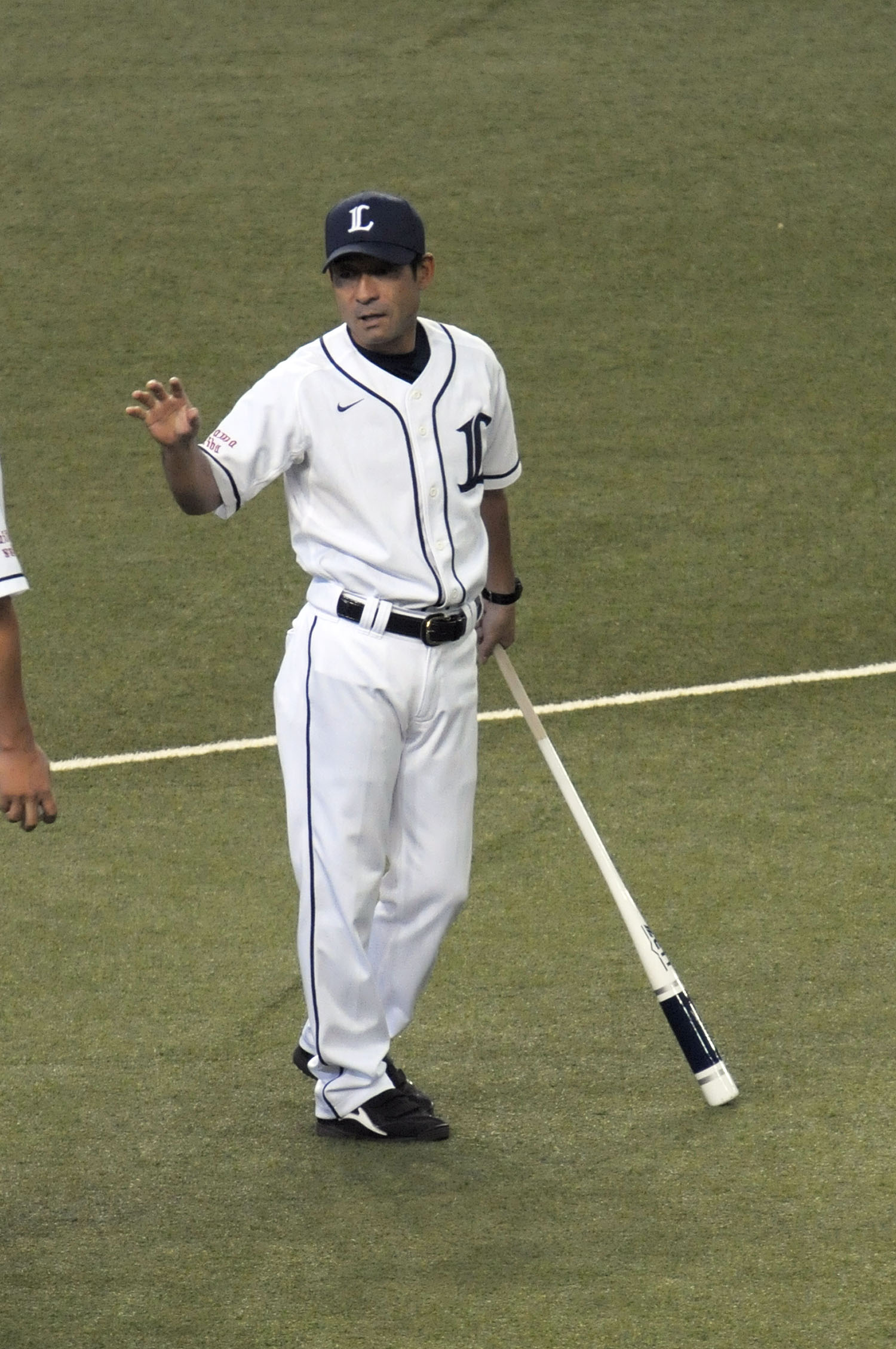
Hiroshi Narahara holding a fungo bat

A fungo bat is a specially designed bat used by baseball and softball coaches in practice. It is a light bat swung by a coach, used to hit balls to players who are practice fielding these hits. The etymology of the word fungo ( /ˈfʌŋɡoʊ/) is uncertain, but the Oxford English Dictionary suggests it is derived from the Scots fung: "to pitch, toss, or fling".

Fungo bats are longer and lighter than regulation bats, with a smaller diameter. Typical fungo bats are 34 to 37 inches (86 to 94 cm) long and weigh 17 to 24 ounces (480 to 680 g). Longer bats are preferred for outfield practice and shorter bats for infield practice. The reduced weight allows a coach to hit many balls without tiring. It also lets them swing the bat one-handed, as they often throw the "pitches" to themselves with their free hand.

== As a weapon ==
Baseball bats are sometimes used as weapons by civilians, criminals, protesters, and mobsters. Baseball bats are effective weapons because they are inexpensive compared to other weapons, and, unlike many other weapons, they can be carried without raising suspicion or violating laws, due to their primary purpose as sports equipment.

Baseball bats have also been used as weapons in various forms of entertainment. As a professional wrestler, Mick Foley sometimes brandished a baseball bat wrapped in barbed wire, which he named "Barbie". Other pro wrestlers have used baseball bats as weapons, and wrestling video games sometimes include bats as special weapons.

Bats are common weapons in fiction as well. Negan, a character on the TV show The Walking Dead carried a barbed wire-wrapped baseball bat named "Lucille", which Jeffrey Dean Morgan has compared to Mick Foley's "Barbie". Harley Quinn, as a member of the Suicide Squad, carries a baseball bat. The baseball bat also has a permanent spot on the wall in the stairwell of the fictional Gallagher family's home (Shameless), serving as a weapon.

== See also ==
- Baseball doughnut
- Composite baseball bat
- Cricket bat
- List of baseball bat manufacturers
- Pink bat
- Softball bat
