= Warstic =

- Industry: Sporting goods
- Founded: 2011; 15 years ago
- Founder: Ben Jenkins
- Headquarters: Dallas, Texas
- Key people: Jack White; Ian Kinsler
- Products: Baseball Equipment; Softball Equipment
- Owner: Ben Jenkins; Jack White; Ian Kinsler
- Website: www.warstic.com

Warstic (Warstic Wood Bat Co) is a baseball bat and sports apparel company. It was founded in 2011 by former Philadelphia Phillies 2nd Baseman Ben Jenkins and musician Jack White,. The company is headquartered in Dallas, Texas.

In 2016 Warstic bats were approved for use in the MLB league. Warstic's core products consist of baseball and softball hard and soft goods for hitting.

== Sponsorships ==
=== Players ===
- Matt Kemp
- Ian Kinsler
- Brent Rooker
- Justin Upton
- Delino DeShields Jr.
