= Logos and uniforms of the Boston Red Sox =

Major League Baseball logos and uniforms

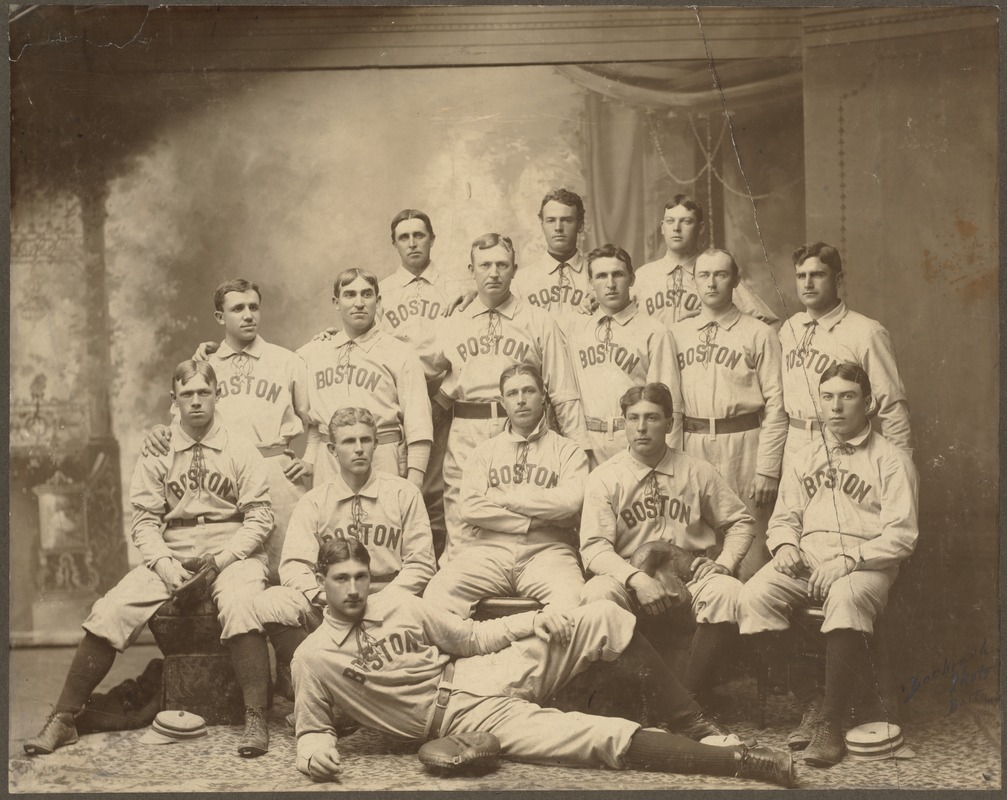
Team photo of the 1901 Boston Americans, the franchise's first season competing in the American League

The logos and uniforms of the Boston Red Sox have gone through a limited number of changes throughout the history of the team.

== Logo ==
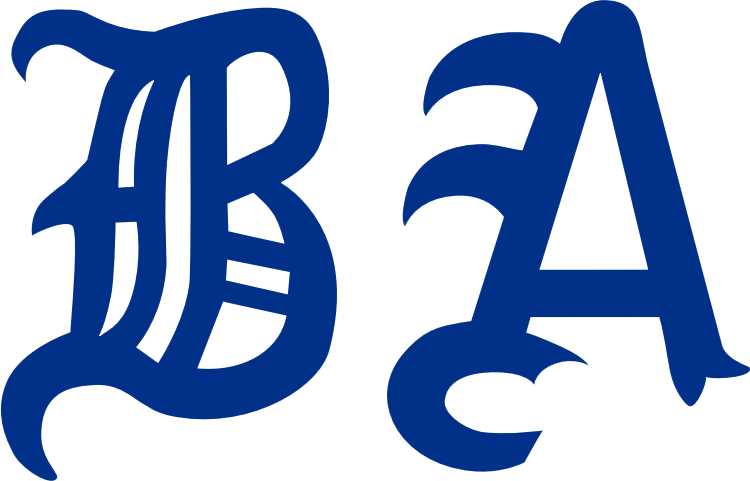
Boston Americans logo used from 1901 to 1907

Boston Red Sox logo used in 1908

== Uniforms ==
=== Home uniforms ===
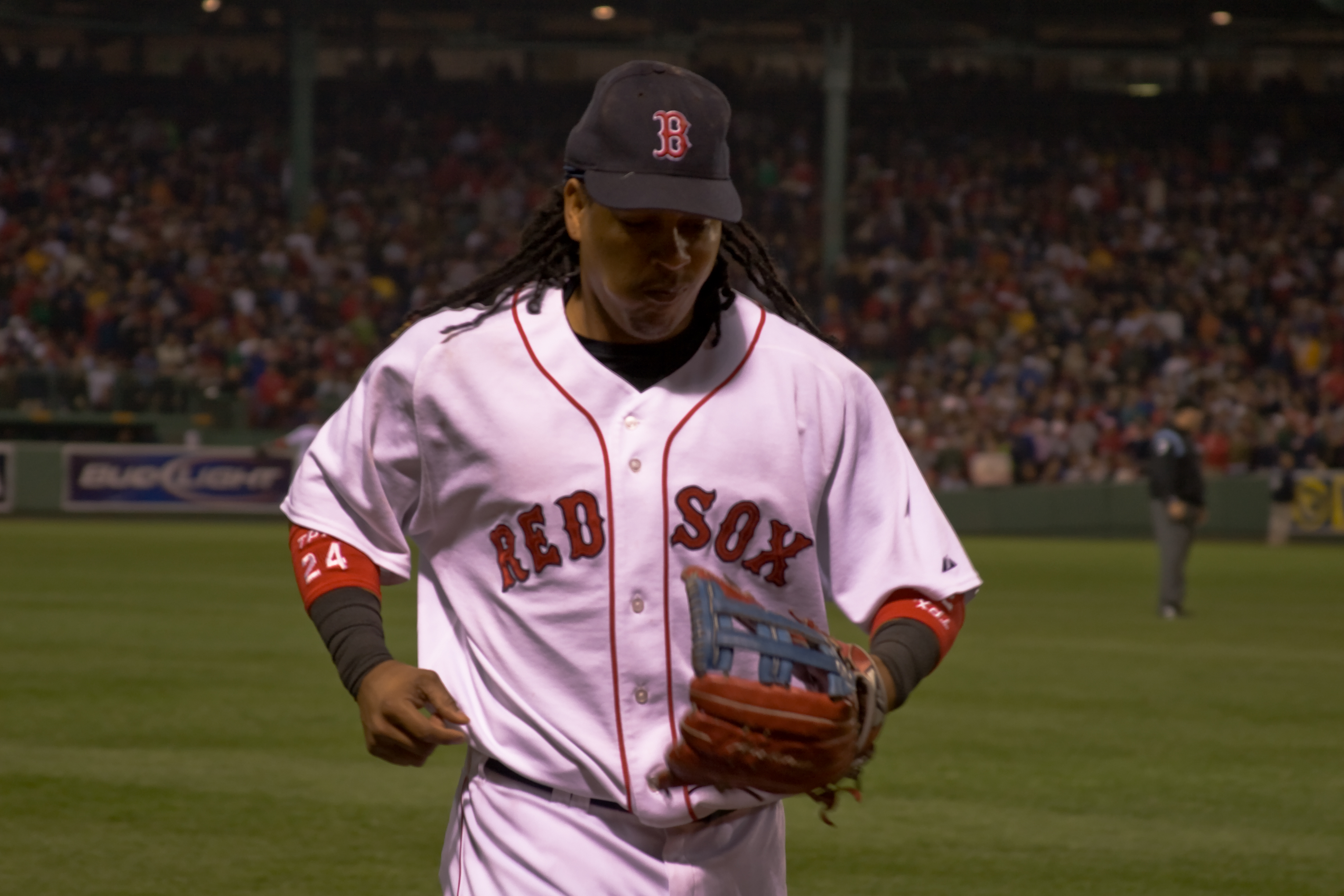
Manny Ramirez in 2007 wearing the current primary home uniform

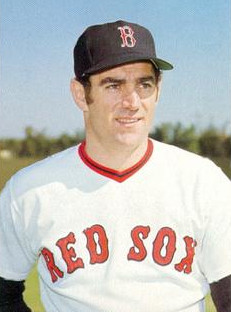
Dick McAuliffe in 1974 wearing the 1973–78 primary home uniform

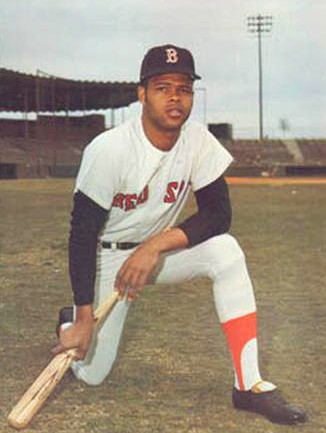
Reggie Smith in 1969 wearing a primary home uniform without red piping

The original Red Sox home uniform featured a silhouette of a red sock with the name "BOSTON" in blocky white letters being placed in the middle of the jersey. It was only used for the 1908 season. The next one consisted of the words "BOSTON" and "RED SOX" in blocky red letters and was used from 1909 to 1935. The current primary home uniform is white with red piping around the neck and down either side of the front placket and "RED SOX" in red letters, outlined in blue, arched across the chest. The current version in ornate lettering has been in use since 1936, although the red piping occasionally disappeared and reappeared between 1969 and 1973. From 1974 to 1978, the Red Sox wore pullovers with the same "RED SOX" template as well as a three-striped belt in red and blue. There are red numbers, outlined in blue, on the back of the home uniform. No player names have ever been used on the back of home uniforms.

=== Road uniforms ===
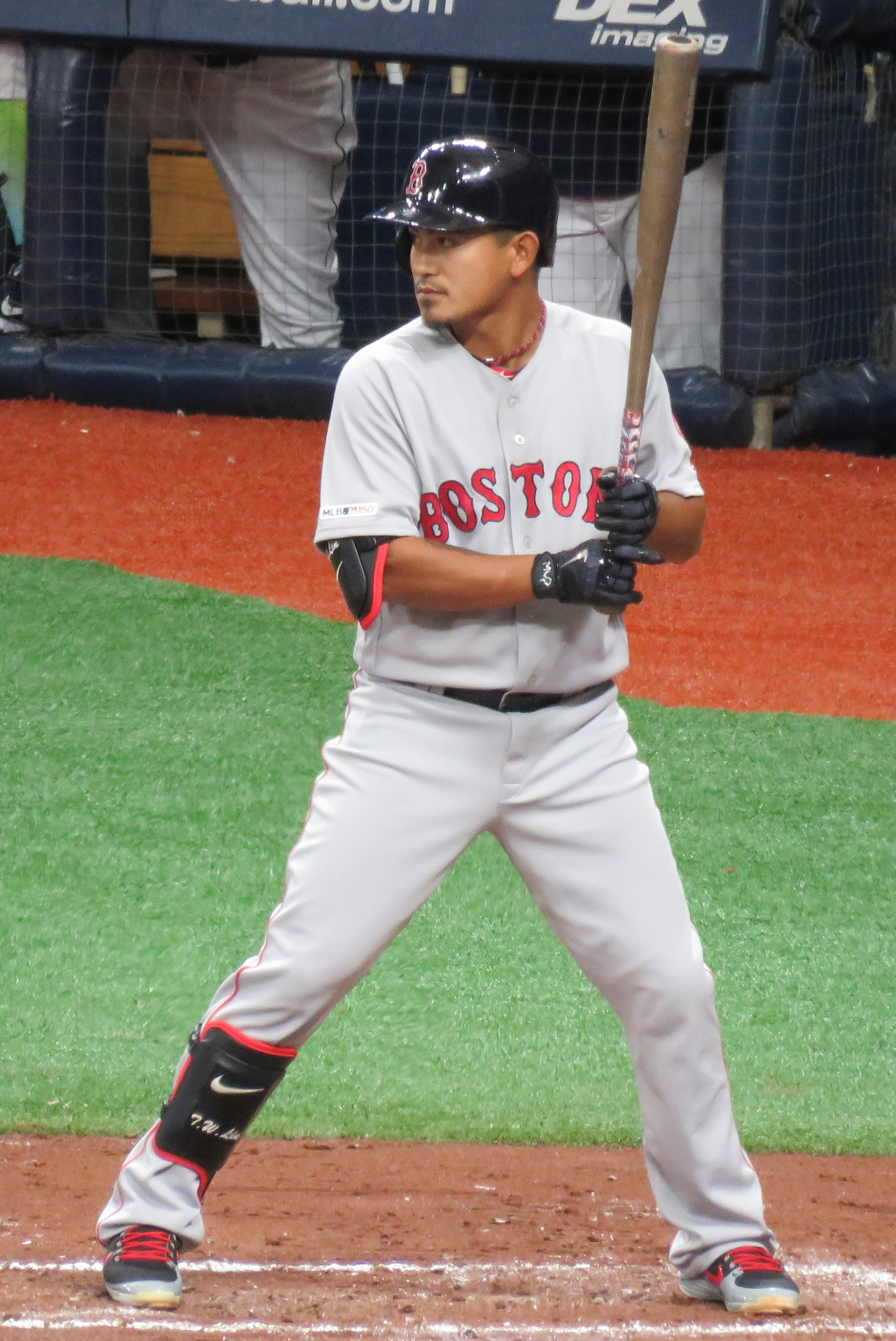
Tzu-Wei Lin wearing the current primary road uniform

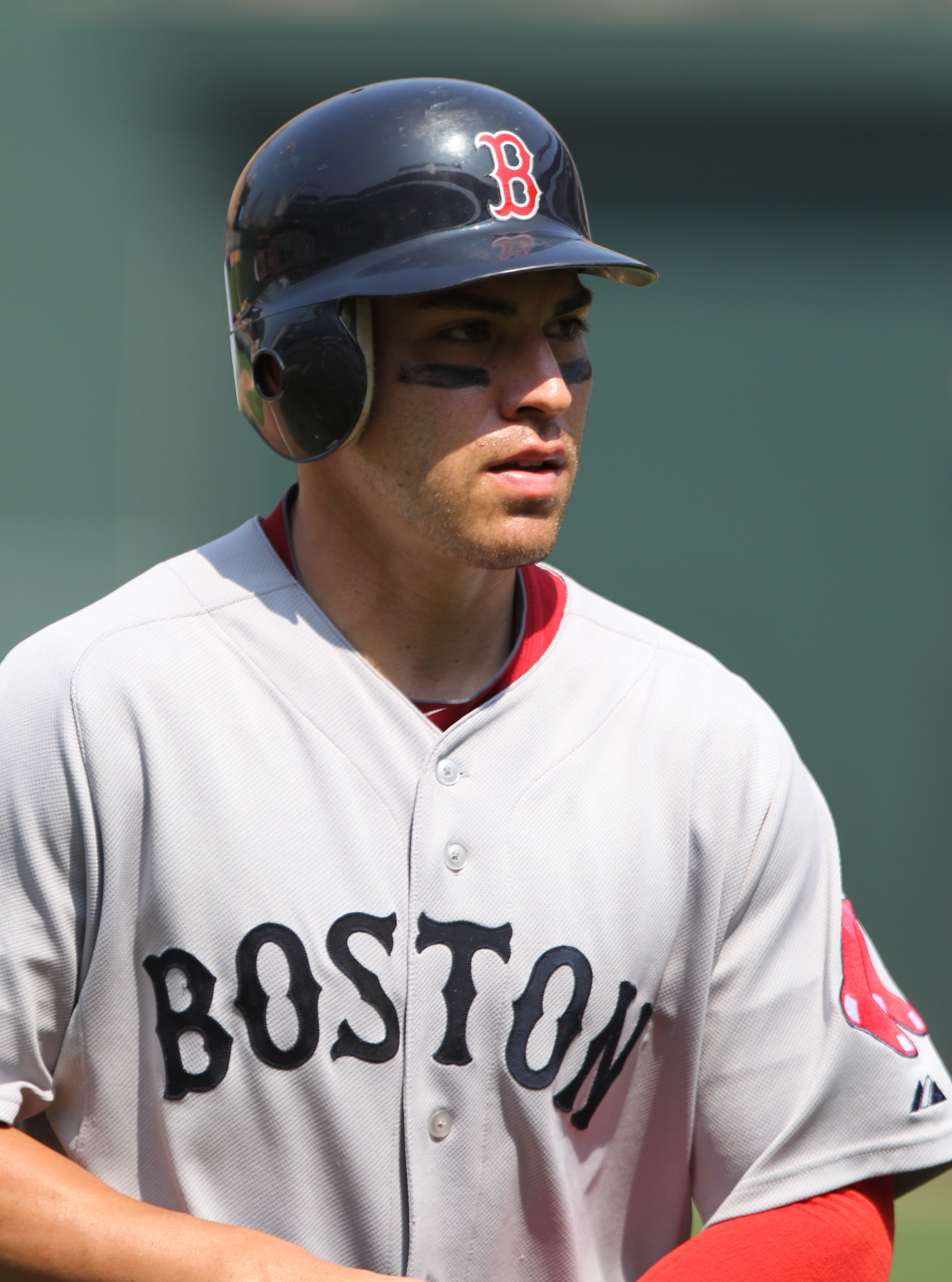
Jacoby Ellsbury in 2011 wearing the 2009–13 road uniform with blue lettering

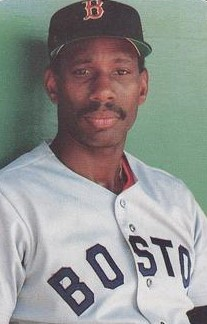
La Schelle Tarver in 1986 wearing a classic road uniform with blue lettering

The Red Sox current uniform and cap logo set has been in use since 1946. While the home uniform has remained virtually the same since then, the road uniform has undergone several minor changes, most notably changing between red and blue lettering on five occasions.

From the introduction of the Red Sox current cap and uniforms in 1946 until 1971, the road uniforms used blue block letters and numbers. With the switch to pullover jerseys in 1972, the lettering was switched to red in the same typeface as the home uniform. The pullovers were dropped in 1979 and the road uniforms once again used blue block letters. However, the red home lettering returned in 1990, along with the home typeface. Also during that season, the Red Sox began sporting each player's last names on the back of their road uniform. In 2009, the lettering was switched to blue yet again, but using the home typeface. That season, the Red Sox also added a "hanging socks" patch on the left sleeve of their road uniform. In 2014, the road uniforms again switched to red in the home uniform font.

Since 1946, the blue and red lettering have each been used three times.

=== Alternate uniforms ===
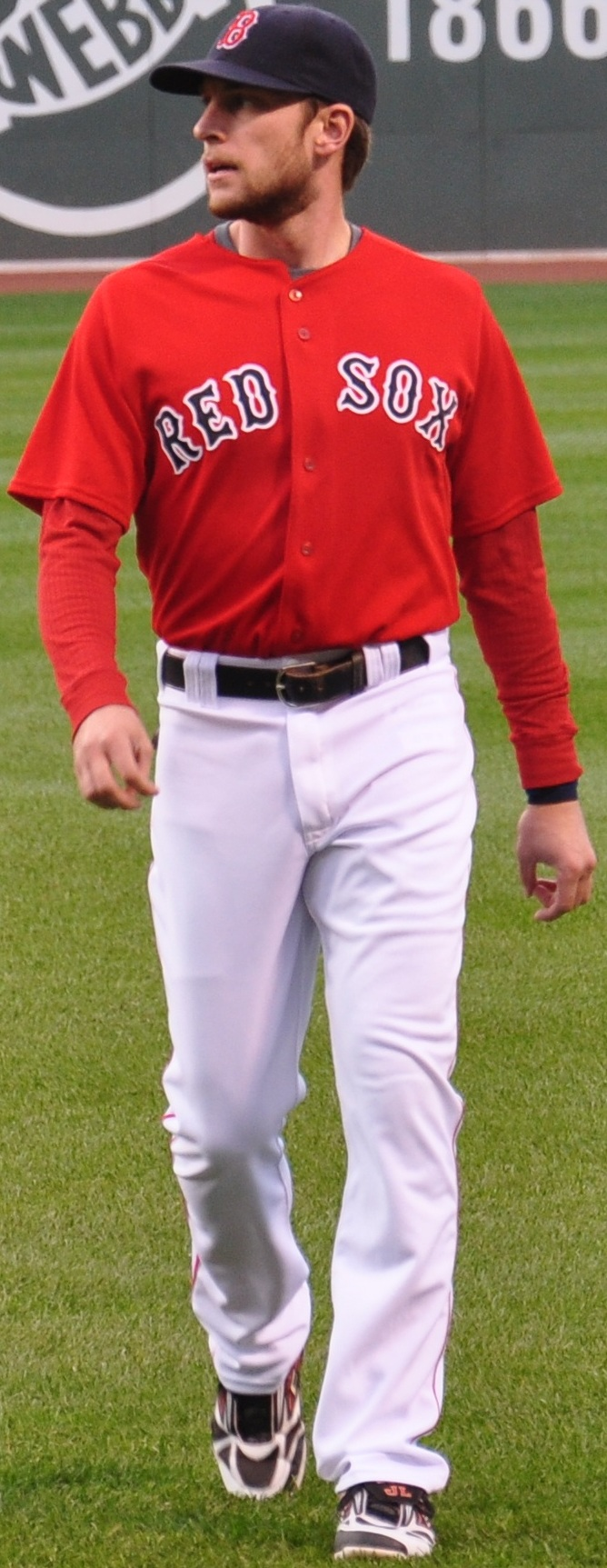
Jed Lowrie in 2011 wearing the red alternate jersey

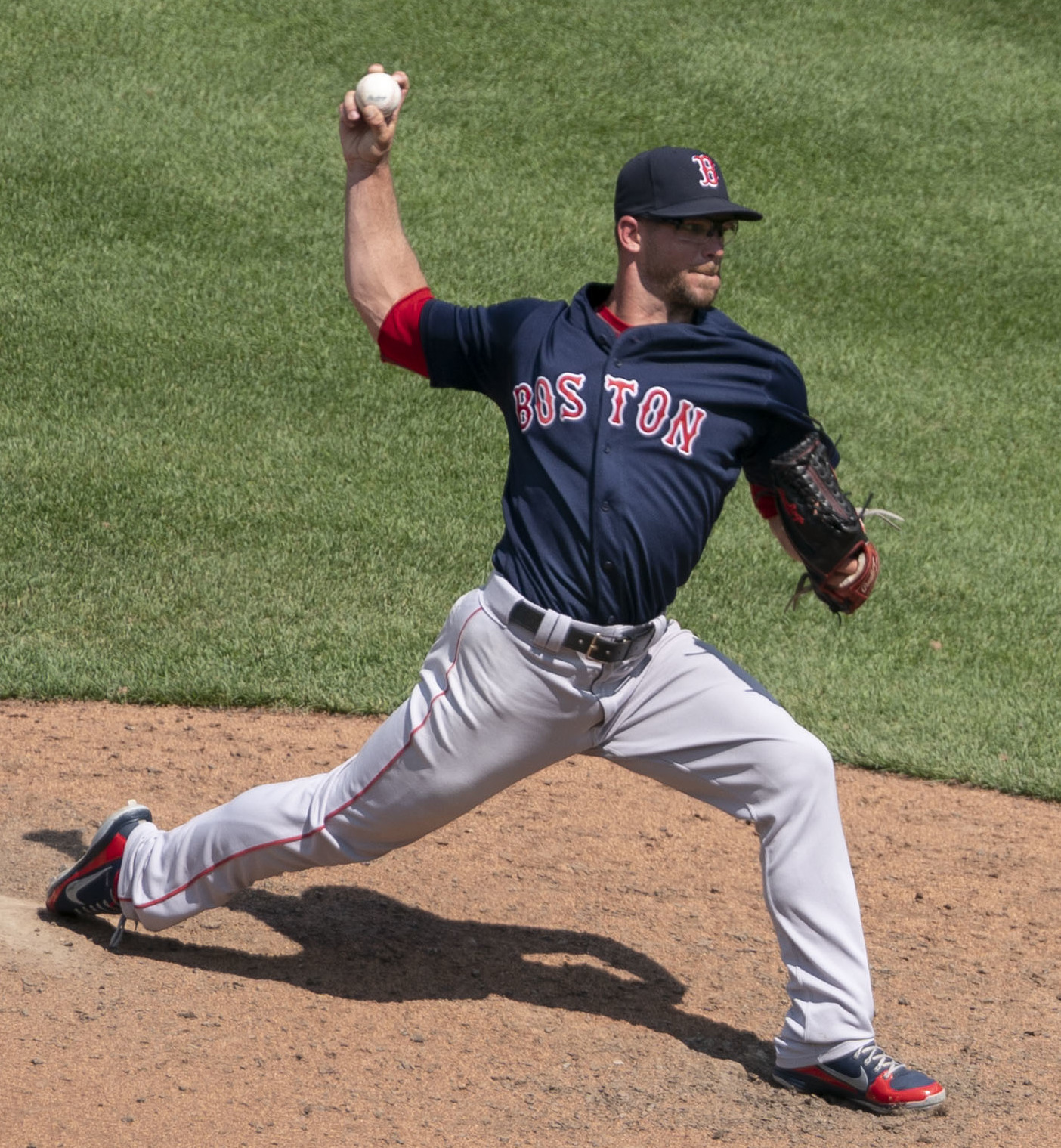
Marcus Walden in 2019 wearing the navy alternate jersey

The Red Sox alternate home uniform jersey is red and worn with white pants. The original version of the red jersey was introduced in 2003. "RED SOX" is displayed across the chest in blue lettering outlined in white. Like the regular home uniforms, it does not feature the player's name on the back, with numbers in blue with white trim. Originally, the uniforms had blue piping that replicated the piping pattern of the regular home jerseys. The uniforms were worn very sparingly from 2003 to 2007, being used only for Sunday afternoon home games and the 4th of July. Thus, they were not seen on national television, except in the circumstance that they were used as part of a doubleheader. In 2008, the uniforms were worn for all Saturday home games, regardless of the game taking place in the afternoon or at night. In 2009, the blue piping was removed from the jersey and they began to be worn for all Friday night home games. For the 2009 season only, an alternate cap was used with this jersey featuring the "hanging Sox" logo.

The alternate road uniform was introduced in 2009, and involves gray pants and a blue jersey with "BOSTON" in red lettering outlined in white across the chest. The numbers and name are also in red with white trim. They are also worn on most Friday road games. The alternate cap was also used for these uniforms in 2009 only.

From 2018 to 2023, the Red Sox wore both their red and blue alternates more often (generally, when a team does not have a set pattern of usage, the uniform used for a particular game is up to the day’s starting pitcher). As such, the uniforms were no longer exclusive to Friday games, and the team sometimes wore their normal white and grey uniforms on select Fridays. The blue alternates were worn when the Red Sox won the 2018 World Series at Dodger Stadium.

In 2024, the home alternate red and road alternate blue uniforms were again worn exclusively during Friday games; the latter depending on the home team's uniform selection. After the season, the blue alternates were retired in favor of keeping the yellow City Connect uniform as their fourth core uniform. Because of this, on March 29, 2025, the home red alternates were worn on the road for the first time at the Texas Rangers, breaking a pair of precedents. It marked the first time since 1933 that the team's uniforms bore "RED SOX" in a road game, and the first time since 1989 that they wore uniforms without player names in a road game. Subsequently, the red alternates became the team's Friday road uniform (again depending on the opposing home team's choice of uniform color) following the introduction of their new City Connect uniform.

=== Other uniforms ===
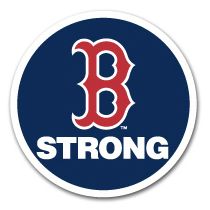
B STRONG logo

For the spring training St. Patrick's Day game, the Red Sox wear bright green jerseys with "RED SOX" in white letters outlined in red across the front and the hanging Sox logo is displayed on the left sleeve. While the other uniforms all use blue caps, this alternate uses a green one matching the uniform shirt. This uniform made its regular season debut on April 20, 2007, to honor former Boston Celtics coach, general manager and president Red Auerbach, who died during the previous off-season. A similar green uniform was worn June 20, 2008, to celebrate the recent Celtics victory over the L.A. Lakers in the NBA Finals. The uniforms had a white stripe down the side and the team wore their normal navy caps. Additionally, the Sox wore a variation of the standard uniforms for Earth Day 2009. The uniform featured a white pullover shirt with a red undershirt and the team name in green. The uniform trim featured green piping along the pants and was finished out with the traditional red socks. Lastly, the hanging Sox logo was modified to feature a green recycling symbol around the logo.

On April 20, 2013, the Red Sox changed the text on their home uniforms from "RED SOX" to "BOSTON" for one day to honor the victims of the Boston Marathon bombing, which took place earlier in the week. Also, a "B STRONG" patch was stitched to the shirts, which was also worn by the opposing Kansas City Royals. Because of the hastily created nature of the jerseys, the text on the front of the jerseys was lacking the blue outline (essentially using the letters of the road alternate navy blue jerseys), although the numbers on the back did have it. On Patriots' Day 2014 (April 21), the Red Sox wore these modified home uniforms again to mark the first anniversary of the bombing. To accurately replicate the original jersey, the blue outline was not present on the front of this version either. The team has continued to wear this uniform on Patriots' Day each year.

=== MLB promotional uniforms ===
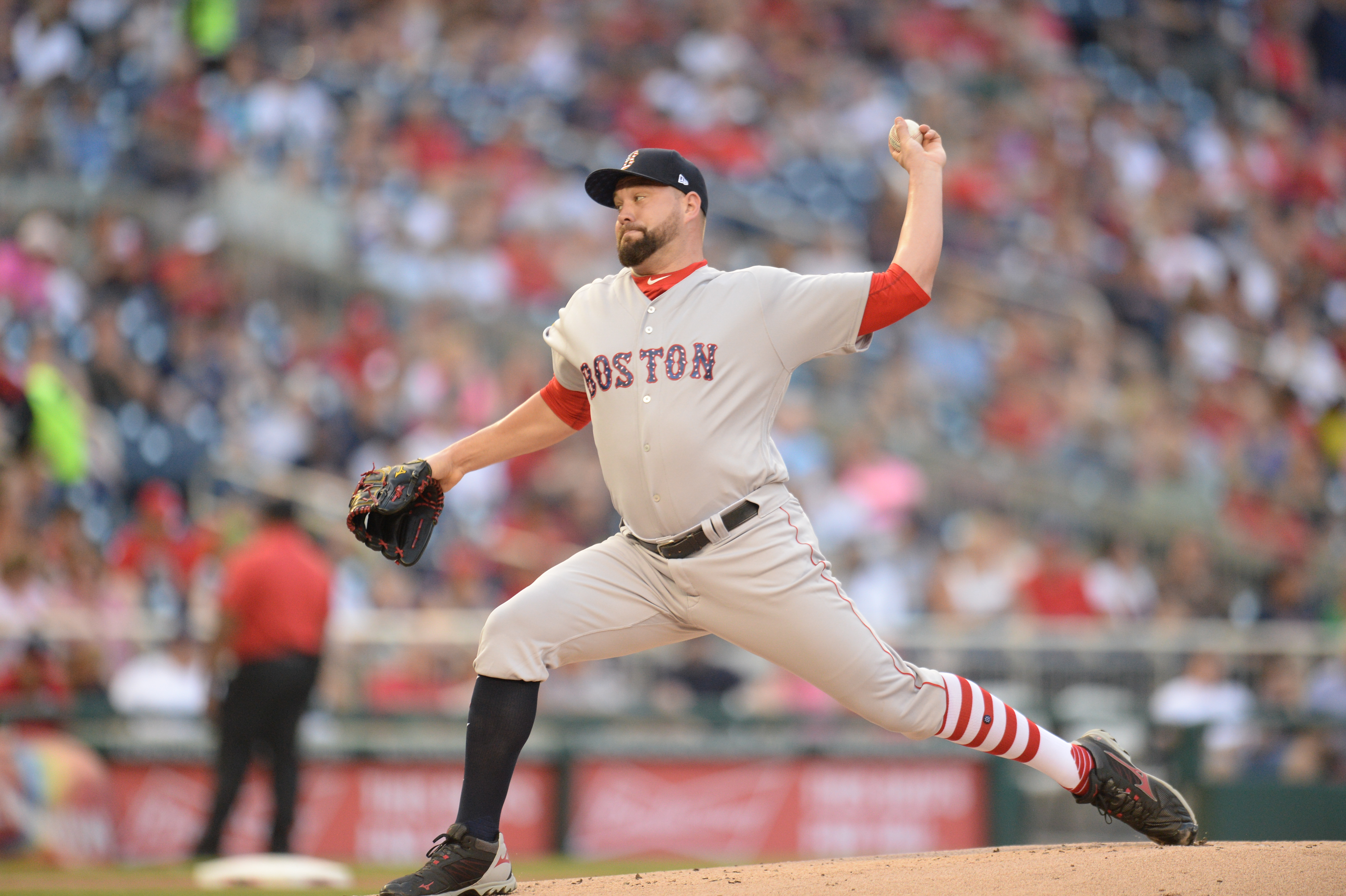
Brian Johnson wearing an American flag-inspired uniform on July 3, 2018

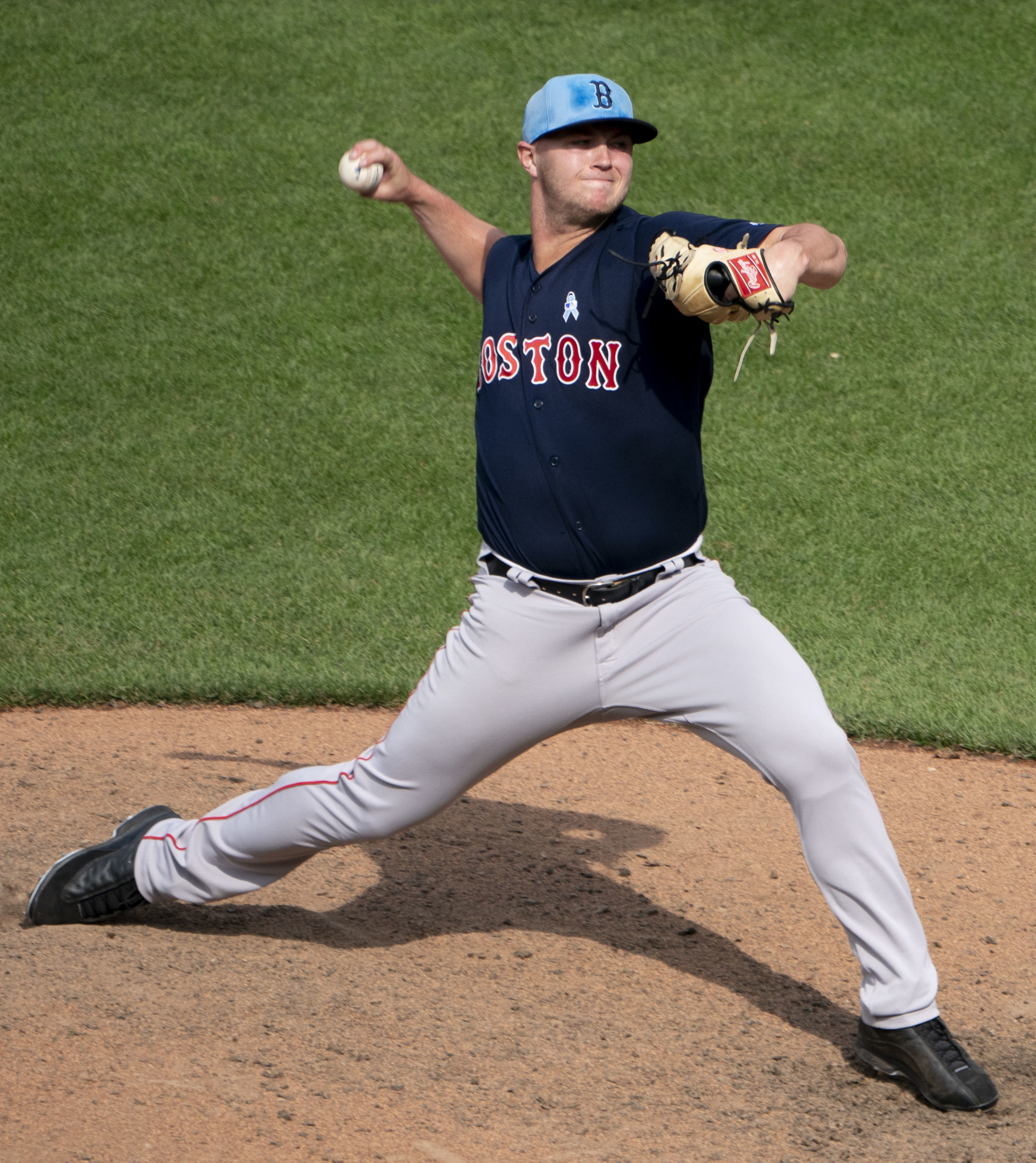
Travis Lakins wearing a specialty Fathers' Day cap on June 16, 2019

The Red Sox, along with all other Major League Baseball teams, have worn special uniforms as part of league-wide promotions on and around several American holidays. These have included camouflage-themed uniforms on Memorial Day (until 2019, now worn on Armed Forces Day), American flag-themed uniforms on Independence Day, pink caps on Mothers' Day (for breast cancer awareness, since 2016), and light blue caps on Fathers' Day (for prostate cancer awareness, since 2016). The specific designs of these uniforms have changed each year, but follow a similar template for all MLB teams each season. Since Nike took over in 2020, however, only special caps and socks were worn for holiday games, with the uniforms no longer containing special embellishments specific to the holiday.

==== Players Weekend ====
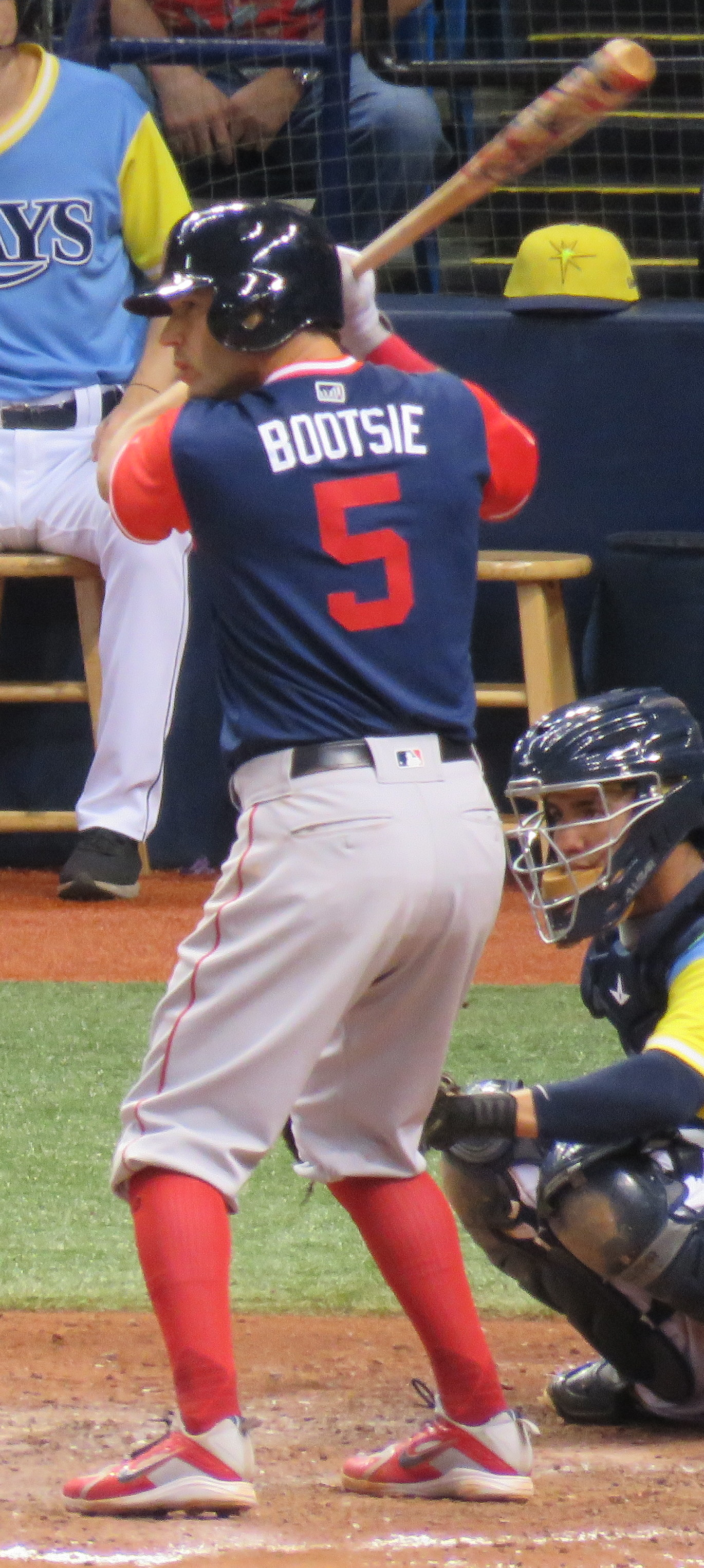
Ian Kinsler (nicknamed "Bootsie") wearing the Red Sox' Players Weekend jersey in 2018

In August 2017, Major League Baseball introduced Players Weekend, a campaign aimed to promote youth baseball, which corresponded with the reveal of a new "colorful" uniform for each member team. For a series at home against the Orioles from August 25–27, the Red Sox wore a navy pullover jersey with red sleeves, featuring a nickname chosen by each respective player or uniformed personnel on the back. The jersey was accompanied by a red cap with the traditional Boston "B" rendered in light blue, being worn with the club's standard home white pants. This was repeated the following season with the same jerseys for a road series at Tampa Bay from August 24–26, 2018, with the cap now featuring the "B" logo in navy along with a navy brim. The Red Sox lost all six games they played across these two series, with the 2018 series loss to the Rays being the only time the eventual World Series champion Red Sox would be swept all season.

In 2019, MLB announced that for the upcoming edition of Players Weekend, all teams would be wearing a monochromatic uniform meant to highlight players' custom accessories. Each home team would choose whether to wear black or white for their series from August 23–25, and the road team would wear the opposite. The Red Sox thus wore all-black uniforms as the road team in San Diego against the Padres, who had opted to wear all-white, and won two out of three games.

The Players Weekend promotion was discontinued after 2019, then reintroduced in 2024 without special uniforms.

==== City Connect ====
On April 6, 2021, the Red Sox unveiled their Nike City Connect uniform—the first of seven to be released around the league in 2021, the others from the Marlins, White Sox, Cubs, Diamondbacks, Giants, and Dodgers. The jersey is yellow with the word “BOSTON” stenciled in light blue text across the front. The sleeves are striped with light blue and white, and there is a “617” (Boston’s area code) patch shaped like a racing bib on the left sleeve. On the lower half, the uniform features white pants with a blue belt. The cap features the regular Red Sox “B” with color changes; both the cap itself and the “B” are the same light blue, and the “B” is outlined with yellow and white. The socks are yellow with light blue heels and toes, light blue and white stripes, the same light blue “B” on the shin of the sock, and the secondary “circle Sox” logo in its usual red color surrounded by black text reading “EST. 1901” on the calf. The colors, font, and style of this uniform take inspiration from the logo of the Boston Marathon. The Red Sox first wore this uniform on April 17 and 18, 2021. The team sported the previously mentioned "B STRONG" home uniform with “BOSTON” on the front on April 19, 2021 (despite Patriots’ Day being the traditional date of the Boston Marathon), but later went on to win 5 in games in a row wearing the yellow jerseys in late September during a chase for the top wildcard spot. After wearing the uniforms sporadically over the following two seasons, manager Alex Cora announced that the yellow "City Connect" jerseys would be worn every Saturday home game starting in 2024.

Following the 2024 season, the yellow City Connect uniform replaced the blue road alternate in the team's core rotation. This was done to keep the popular yellow uniform while adhering to Nike's "four plus one" rule (which limits MLB teams to four main uniforms plus a City Connect) in preparation for a new City Connect uniform, planned to be unveiled in 2025.

On May 16, 2025, the Red Sox unveiled their second City Connect uniform, which is mainly inspired by the famed Green Monster. The font of the uniform is the same as the numbers and letters on the Green Monster. Inside the collar of the jersey features the year "1912" which is the year Fenway Park opened, and also features the same grey color as the concrete used to construct the Green Monster. The yellow number on the uniform represents the same color used for the score during the current inning. The jersey also features a blue and red dot, which matches the colors of balls, strikes, and outs. The jersey has a patch with the letter "B" inside a green and white circle, which represents the city of Boston and also represents when a team gets a hit or an error on the most recent play. The hat is also the same green color as the Green Monster, features the normal "B" font in a grey color that matches the concrete. These uniforms are worn on Friday home games.

=== Uniform advertisements ===
Starting with the 2023 season, the Red Sox wore a MassMutual patch on either sleeve depending on the batter's handedness. The "hanging Sox" patch that was placed on the left sleeve of the road uniform since 2014 was relocated to a different sleeve location to make way for the sponsor patch.

=== Uniform numbers ===
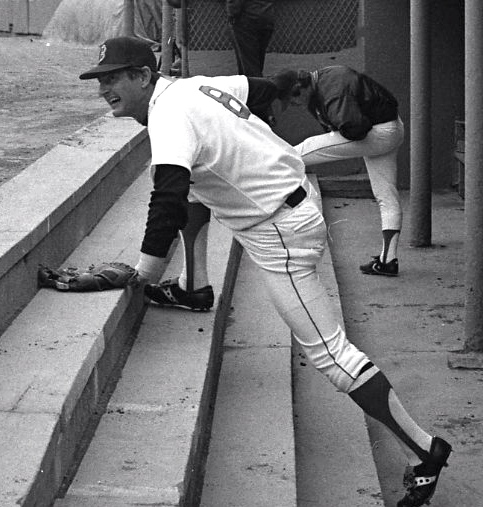
Carl Yastrzemski's uniform number 8 has been retired by the team.

The Red Sox have worn uniform numbers since 1931. The team has honored several players with retired numbers, starting with Ted Williams (9), Joe Cronin (4), Bobby Doerr (1), and Carl Yastrzemski (8) in the 1980s.

Before 1950, no number higher than 46 had been worn, with the exception of 81 and 82 by Lou Lucier and Johnny Lazor in 1943, and 66 by Joe Cascarella in 1935. A number in the 50s was first worn by Bobby Guindon (51) in 1964, in the 70s by Josh Bard (77) in 2006, and in the 90s by Alfredo Aceves (91) in 2011. Number 0 was worn for the first time by Brandon Phillips in 2018, and 99 was first worn by Alex Verdugo in 2020.

Through the conclusion of the team's 2025 season, every number in the 0 through 99 range had been worn during a regular season game, with the exception of 69, 86, 87, 88, 90, 92, 93, 95, 96, 97, and 98. Numbers 86, 87, 88, and 90 have been worn by coaches or uniformed staff members (such as the team's bullpen catcher) but not by a player. The most recent instance of a number being worn in a game for the first time was number 80 by Raynel Espinal during the 2021 season.

== Caps ==
(Left) Classic "B" cap logo used from 1954 to 1996
(Right) Modified "B" cap logo used since 1997

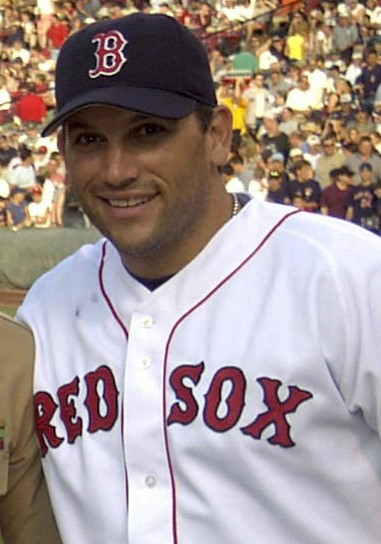
Doug Mirabelli in 2002 with the standard blue cap

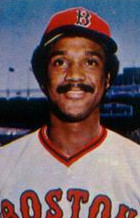
Jim Rice in 1977 with the red/blue cap

The Red Sox typically feature a navy cap with a red "B" in a western lettering. The logo closely resembles to the Boston Braves "B" from 1908, 1921-1928 and 1936-1937, as well as the Brooklyn Dodgers “B” from 1909 to 1958. This has been a Red Sox standard for a majority of their existence, though from 1974 through 1978 the caps were red with a blue brim, and the "B" in blue with white trim.

In 1931, the Red Sox started adding logos on their caps for the first time such as a single red sock logo with pinstripes on the background. In 1933, the single red sock logo was replaced by a blocky red "B" as well as the pinstriped caps were changed to a navy blue color. From 1936 to 1945, an early version of the famous western-styled red "B" has been adopted by the team. This logo would become officially recognizable starting with the 1946 season, when the western red "B" has given a thick white outline. Since 1954, the "B" logo has been modified to its current shape as it looks today, despite it had several variations until 1997.

In 2009, the alternate hanging Sox logo caps were unveiled, and were paired with the alternate uniforms. However, during the 2010 season they reverted to the regular "B" cap regardless of what uniform they wear.

The team's yellow Boston Marathon-themed yellow jerseys, first worn in 2021 as the team's first City Connect uniform, are paired with a light blue cap with the team's regular "B" also in blue and outlined in yellow and white.

== Socks and sweatshirts ==
From 1936 to 2002 (with the exception of the 1974 alternate home uniform), the club sported blue undershirts or sweatshirts and tri-colored stirrup stockings, with a red anklet and two white stripes on a navy blue background on the upper sock. In 1974, the team wore red sweatshirts (and solid red stirrups) at home and traditional blue sweats with tri-colored stirrups on the road. Since 2003, the team has worn all-red stockings with both their home and away uniform sets, along with red sweatshirts, with one exception: as part of the 2009 logo and uniform redesign, the Red Sox initially wore solid blue stockings and sweatshirts with their road uniforms. The changes drew some criticism from fans for featuring solid blue stockings, instead of red, and their similarity to the Yankees' uniforms, and the team switched back to red sweatshirts and stockings after their first road trip and the remainder of the season. While Curt Schilling notably wore stirrup stockings during his Boston career, most players have abandoned stirrups for full socks.

== Gallery ==
Historic Red Sox uniforms

Dutch Lerchen, circa 1910

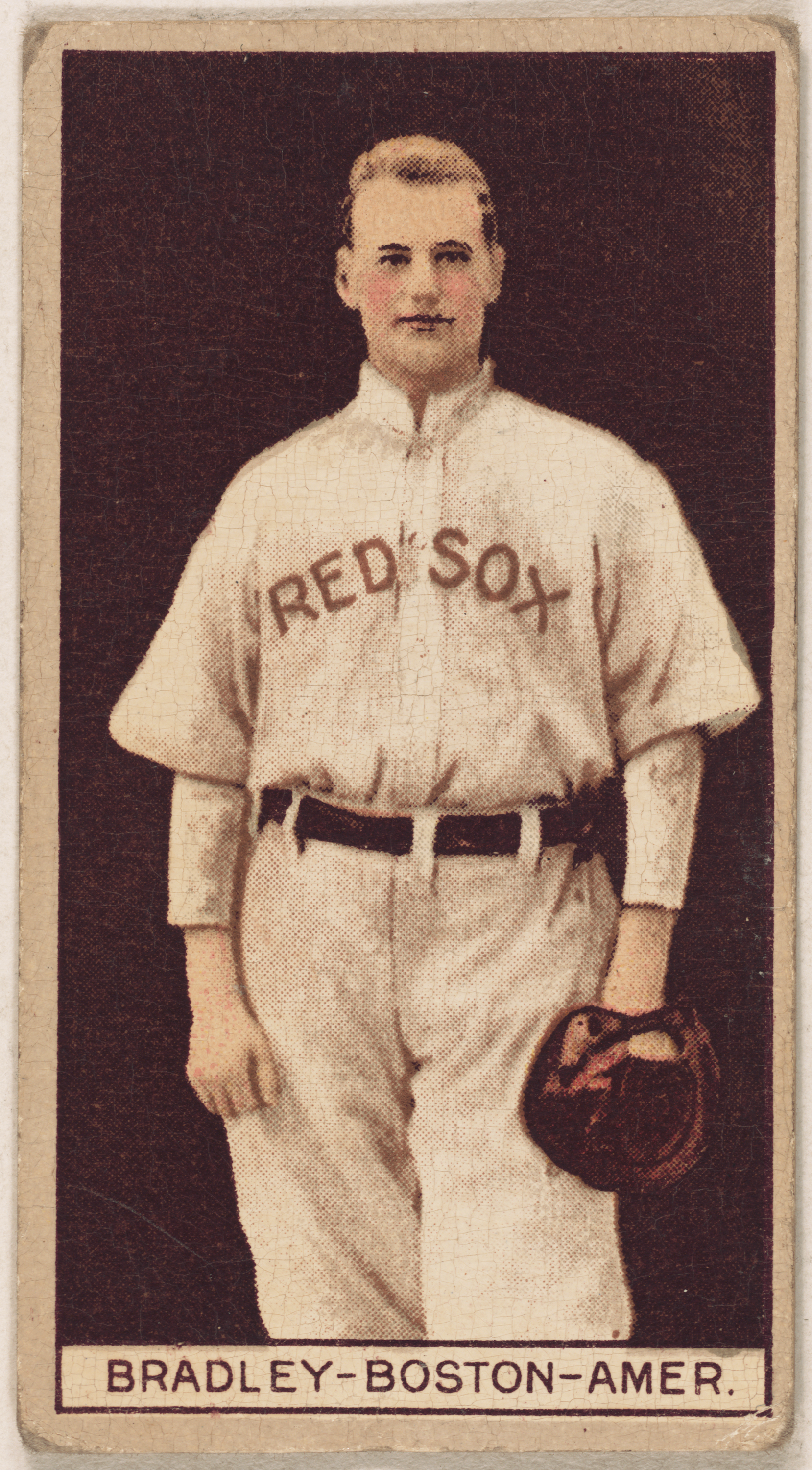
Hugh Bradley, circa 1912

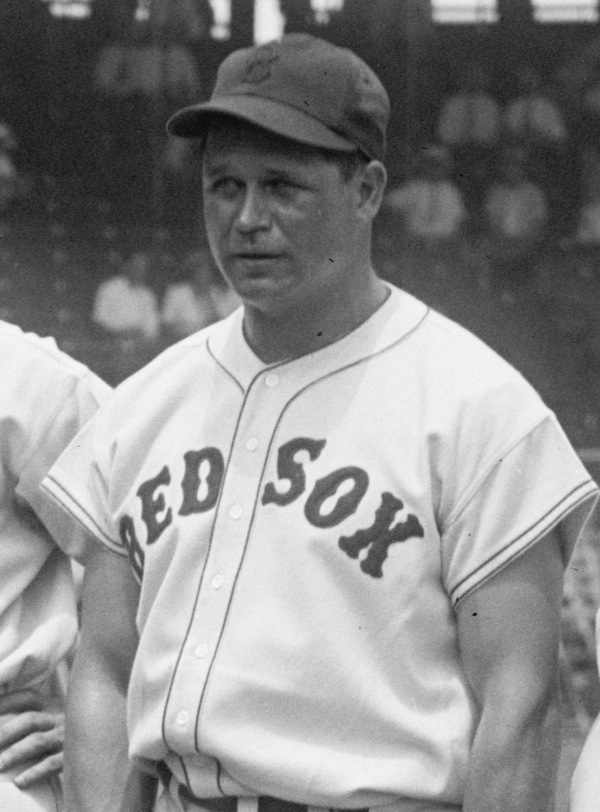
Jimmie Foxx, circa 1937

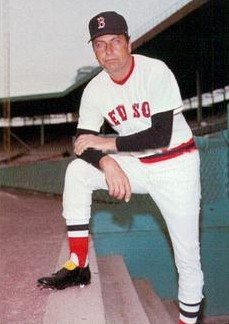
Manager Darrell Johnson, circa 1974

Contemporary Red Sox uniforms

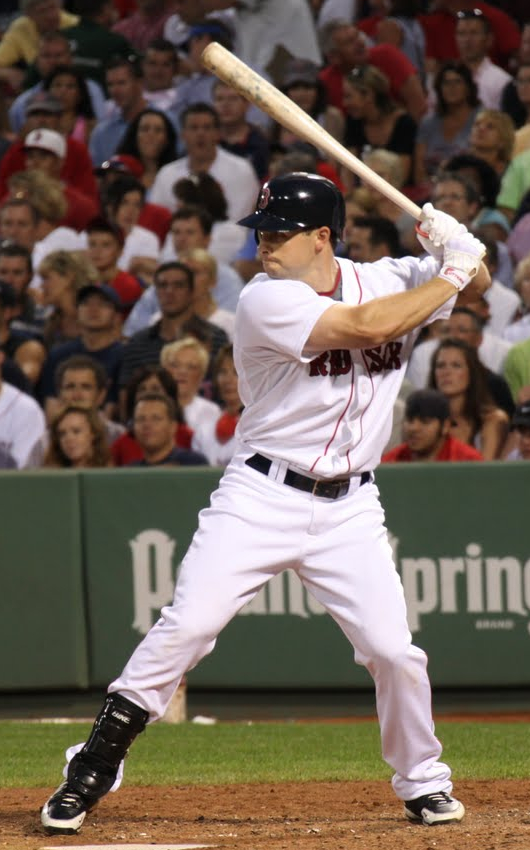
Daniel Nava wearing the current Red Sox home uniforms

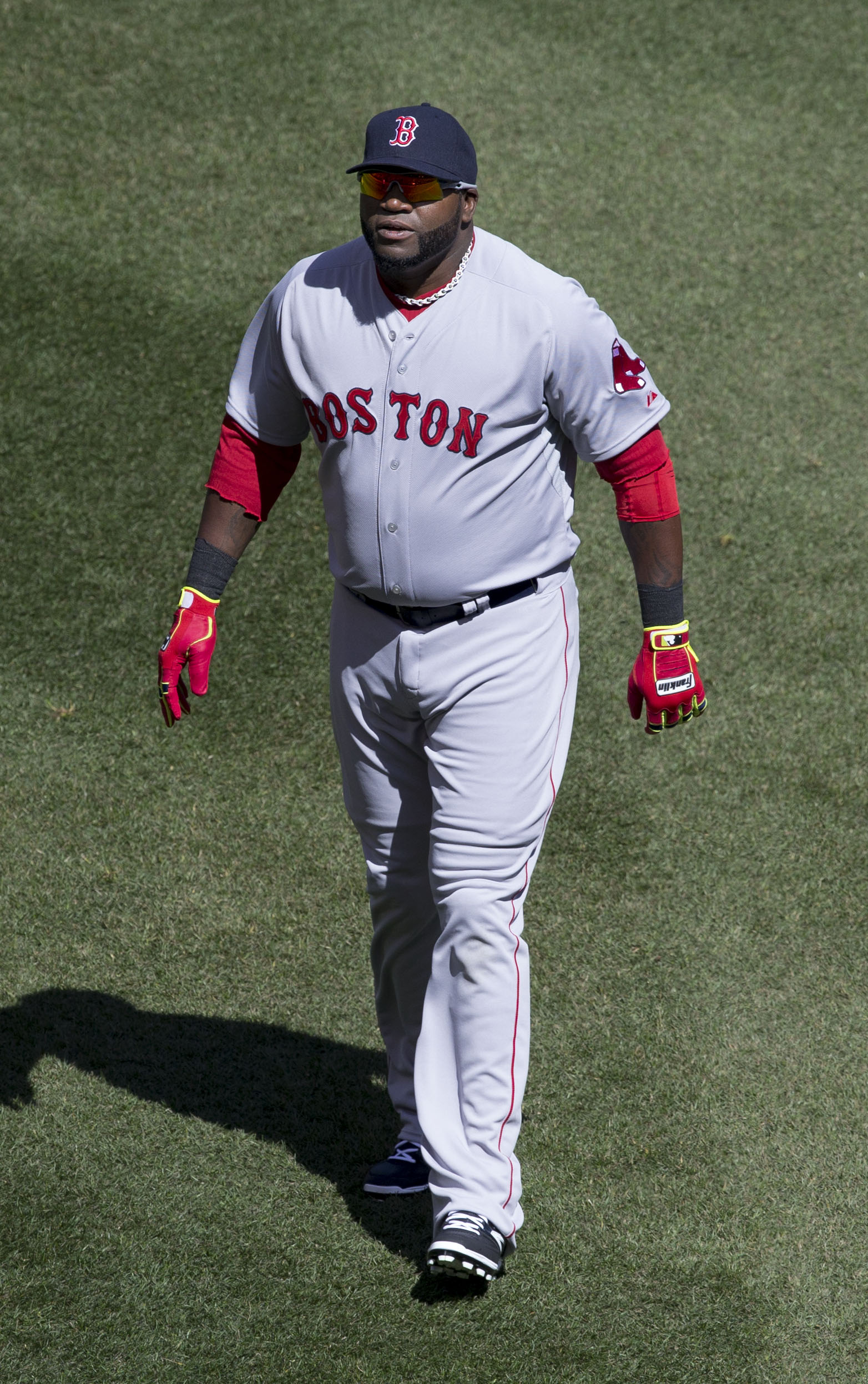
David Ortiz wearing the current Red Sox road uniforms

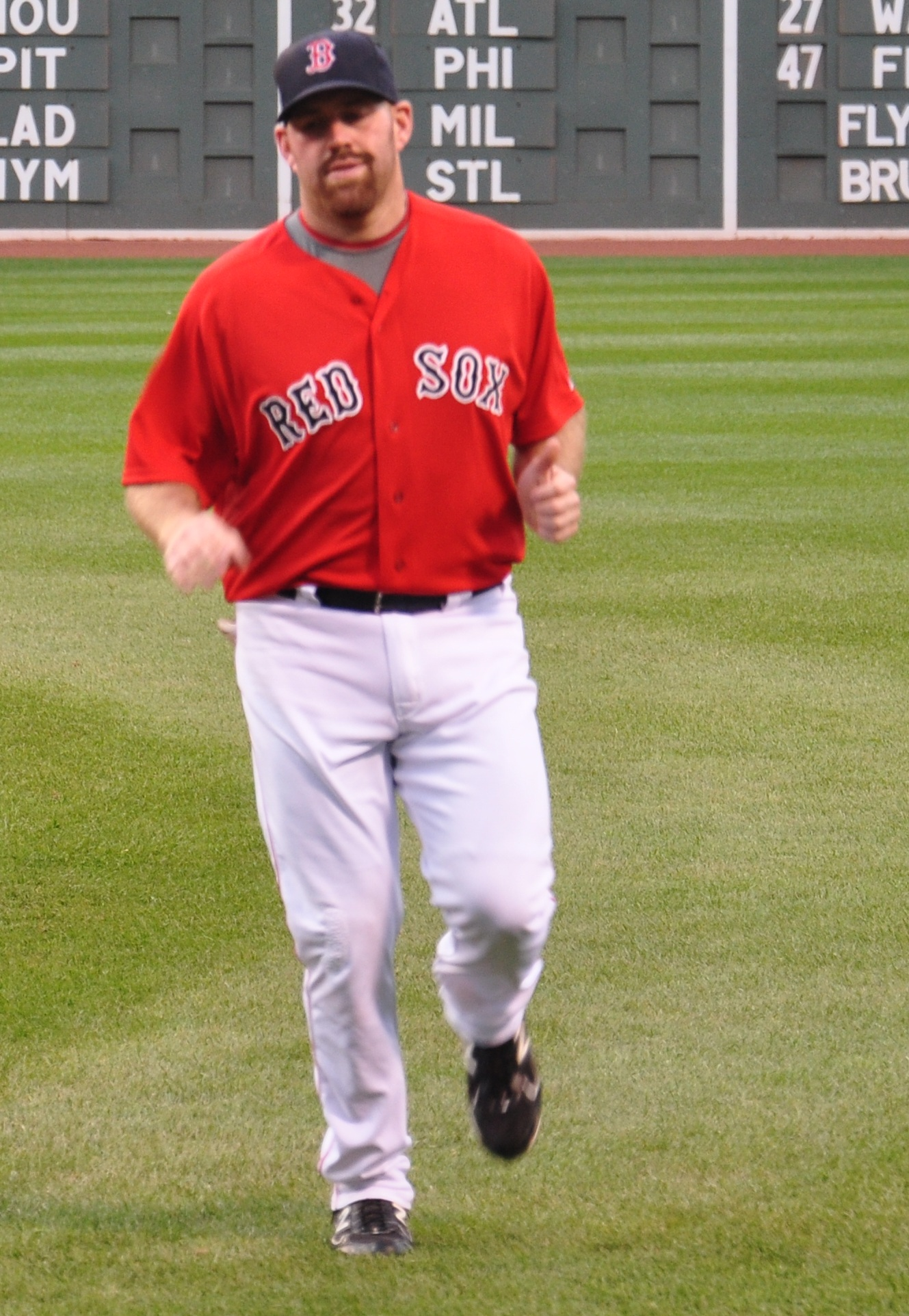
Kevin Youkilis wearing the alternate Red Sox home uniforms

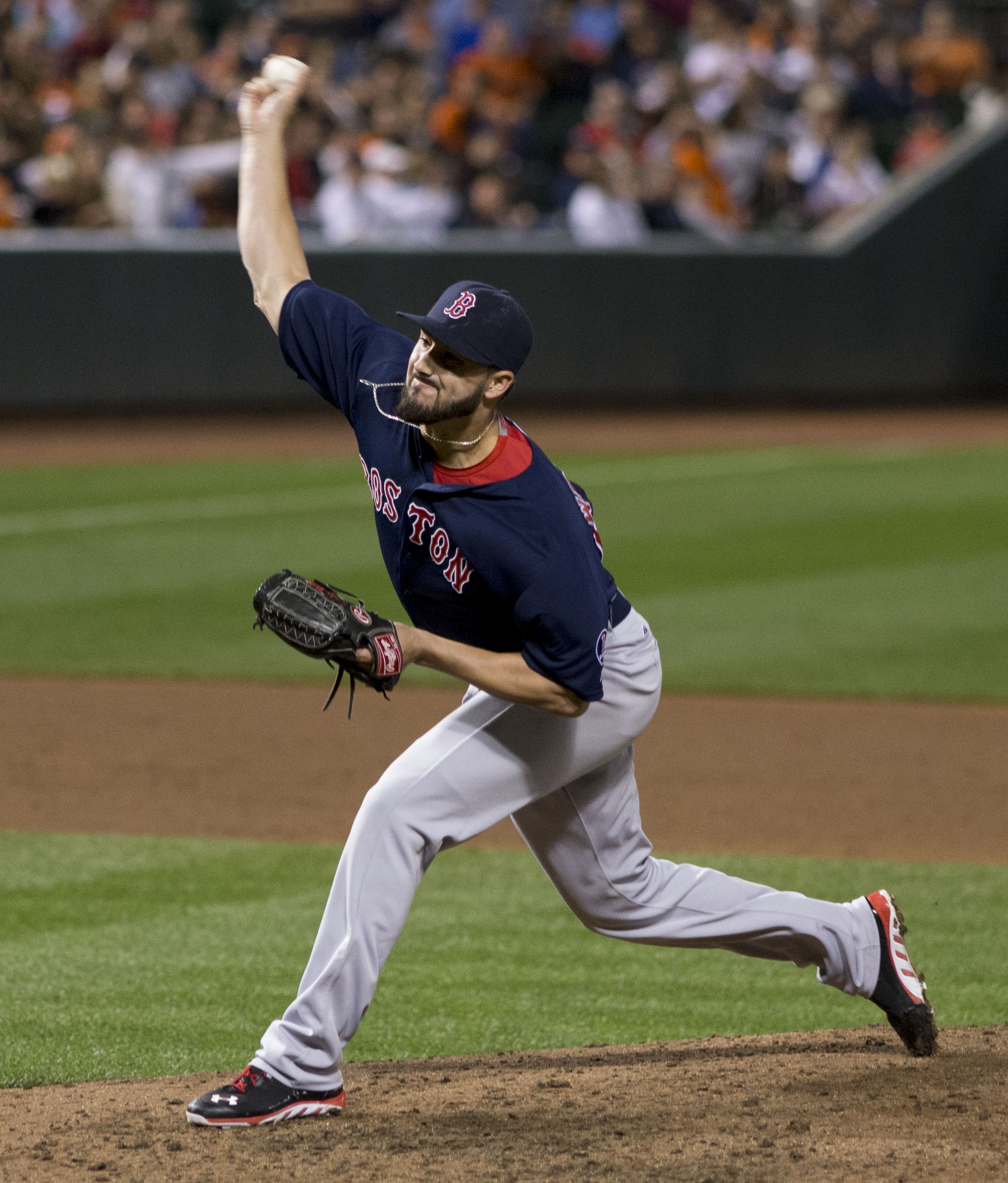
Brandon Workman wearing the alternate Red Sox road uniforms

== See also ==
- Major League Baseball uniforms
- History of the Boston Red Sox
