= Pinstripes =

Recurring pattern of thin, widely-spaced stripes

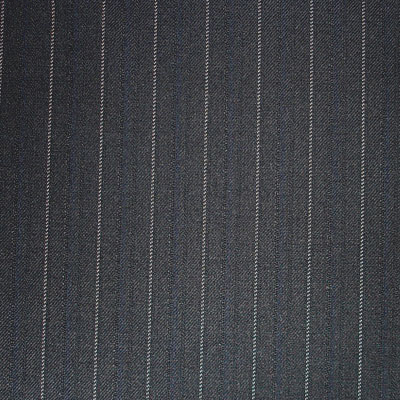
Fabric with a pinstripe pattern

Pinstripes are a pattern of very thin stripes of any color running in parallel. The pattern is often found in fashion fabrics. Pinstripes are very thin, often 1/30 inch (0.85 mm) in width, and are created with one single-warp yarn.

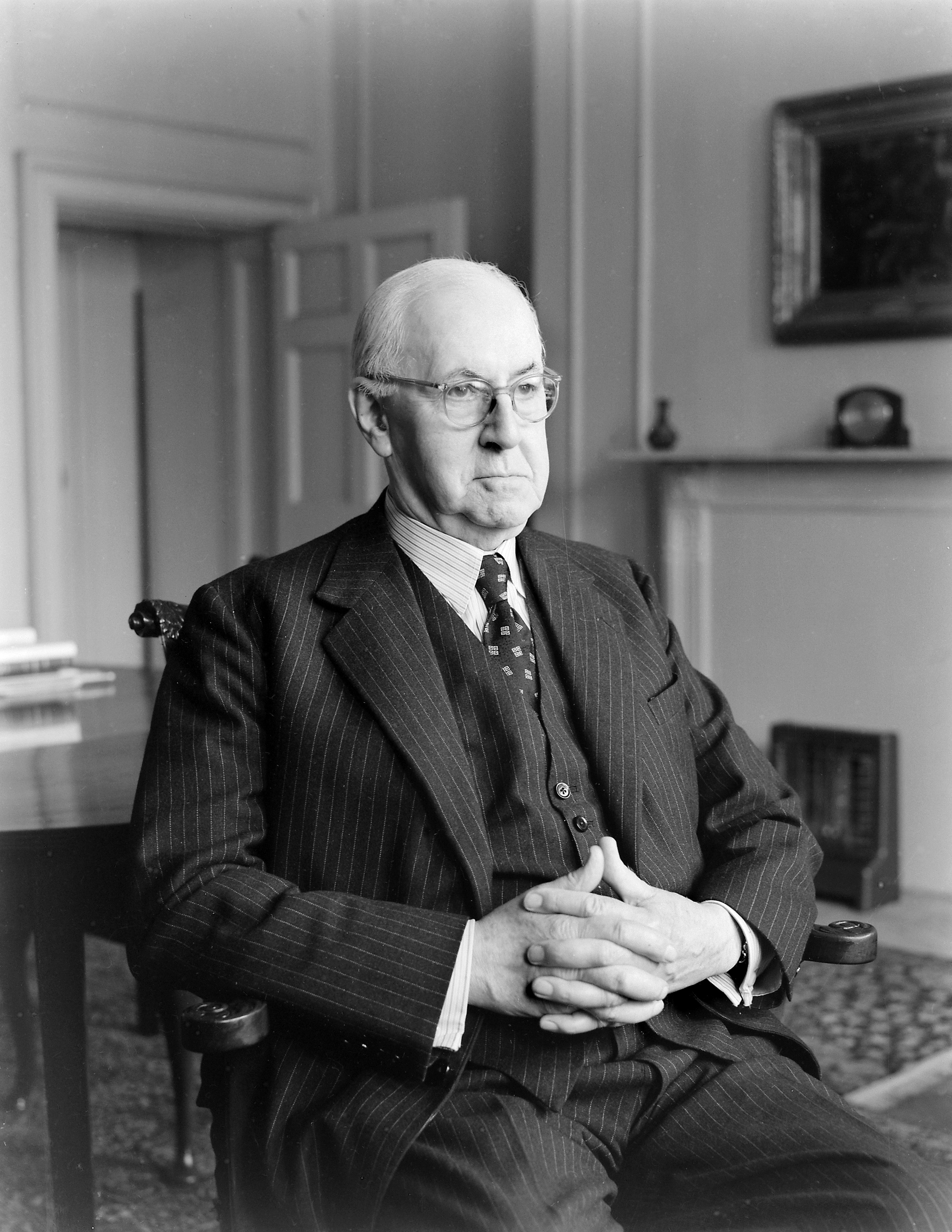
English pharmacologist and physiologist Henry Hallett Dale wearing a pinstripe suit

== Men's suits ==
Although found mostly in men's suits, any type of fabric can be pinstriped, including fabric for shirts. Pinstripes were originally worn only on suit pants but upon being adopted in the United States during the 20th century they were also used on suit jackets. Pinstripes have been found on suits since the early 19th century. They were used by banks in London to identify their employees.

== Baseball ==
The Boston Nationals' baseball uniforms have had pinstripes since 1907 and they are recognized as the first Major League Baseball team to incorporate pinstriping into a baseball uniform. Many other former and current Major League Baseball teams—including the Florida Marlins, Minnesota Twins, Montreal Expos, Colorado Rockies, New York Mets, New York Yankees, Chicago White Sox, Chicago Cubs, Detroit Tigers, Philadelphia Phillies, Houston Astros and the San Diego Padres—later adopted pinstripes on their own uniforms. The Yankees, in particular, are associated with the pattern. This was later carried over into the National Basketball Association, with teams like the Chicago Bulls, Charlotte Hornets and Orlando Magic incorporating pinstripes into their uniforms.

== History ==
References to pinstripes can be found in Geoffrey Chaucer's The Canterbury Tales (written between 1387 and 1400), where the Sergeant at the Law is described as wearing "a homely parti-coloured coat girt with a silken belt of pin-stripe stuff".

== Chalk stripe ==
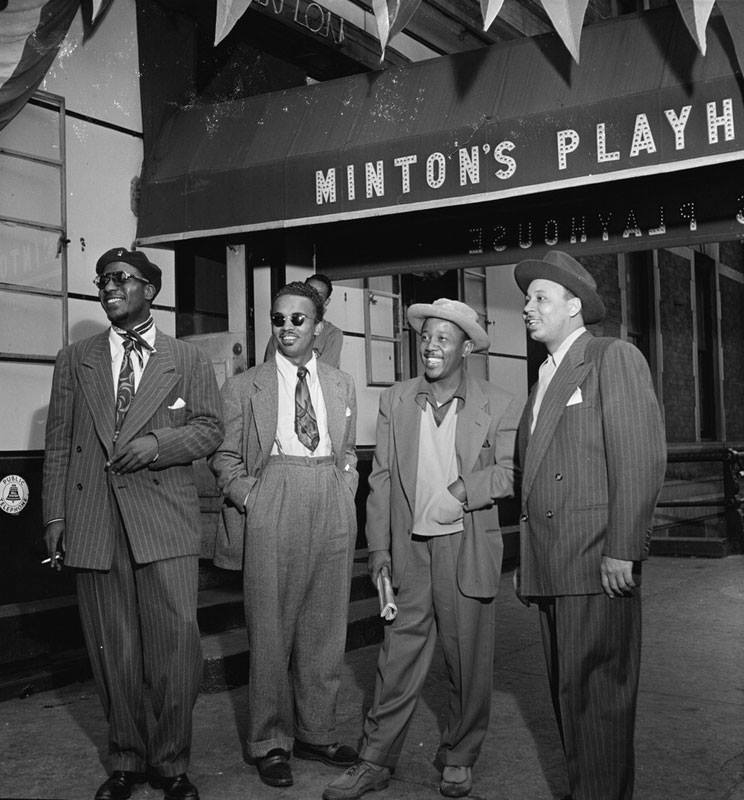
Thelonious Monk, Howard McGhee, Roy Eldridge, and Teddy Hill, in front of Minton's Playhouse in New York City, some wearing chalk stripe zoot suits. (1947)

The pinstripe is often compared to the wider chalk stripe.
