= Baseball stirrups =

Clothing item that is part of a baseball uniform

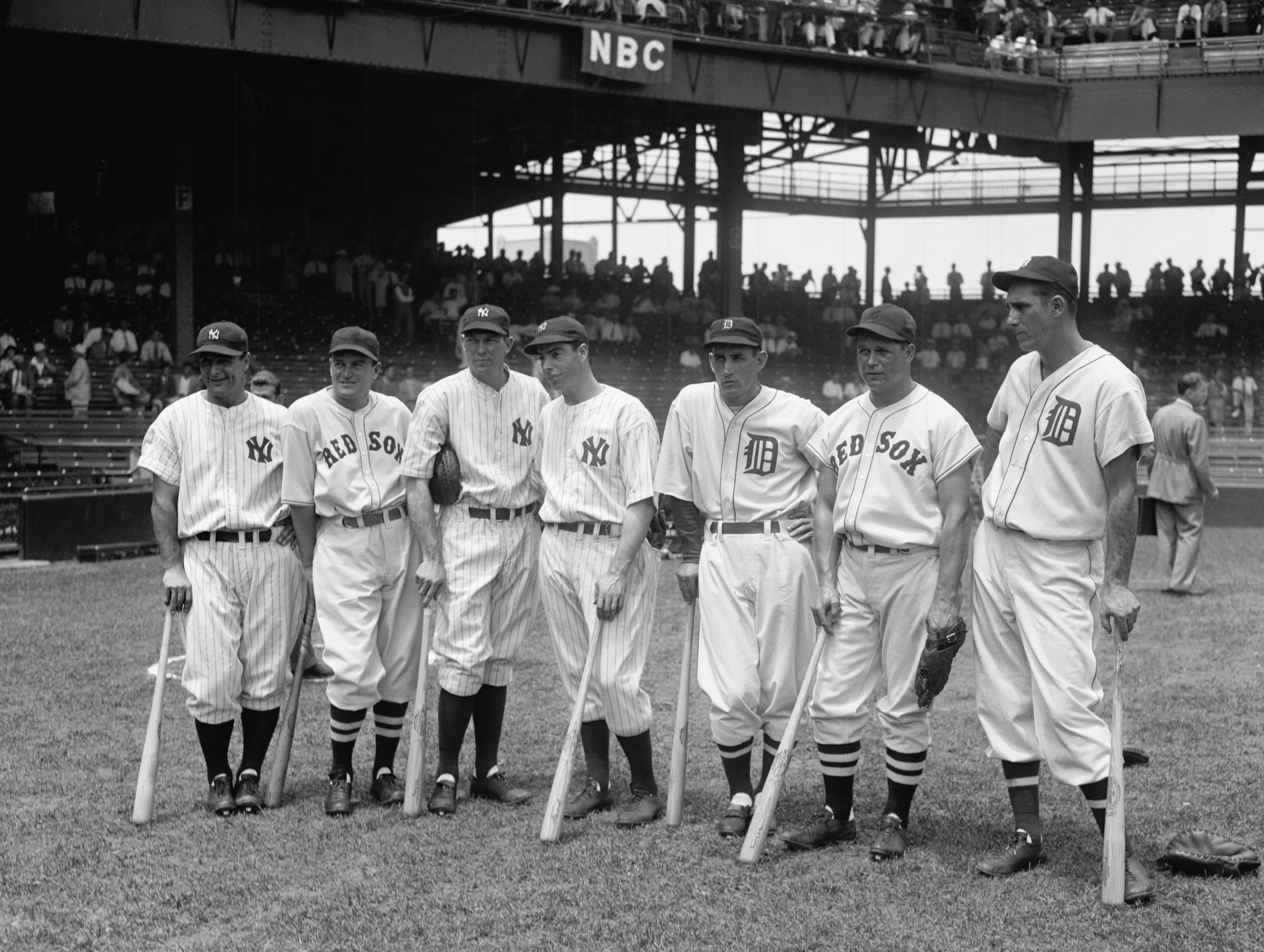
Players at the 1937 Major League Baseball All-Star Game wearing traditional stirrup socks

Baseball stirrups, also called stirrup socks or simply stirrups, are socks that are part of a traditional baseball uniform, giving the uniform a distinctive look. Stirrup socks are usually one of a team's traditional colors, and are worn over long socks that are usually white in color. The stirrup sock lacks toe and heel sections, instead having a loop (a stirrup) which fits within the arch of the foot. Over the years, the stirrup loop tended to get longer, exposing more of the white undersock, thus creating a look unique to baseball.

Most contemporary players in Major League Baseball (MLB) do not wear stirrup socks, as uniform pants that extend all the way down to the ankle have become increasingly popular since the mid-1990s.

== History ==
In the early days of the sport, baseball players wore their pant legs low. High socks, and with them, knickerbockers ("knickers"), which were commonly worn by boys in the late 19th century and into the 20th century, were introduced as part of the baseball uniform by the 1869 Cincinnati Red Stockings. They wore red stockings that were displayed prominently with the high pants, true to their name, but it was not until the early 20th century that the stirrup stocking was introduced. In 1905, Nap Lajoie suffered an infected spike wound, attributed to the dye in his socks (fabric color dyes were thought not to be color fast in those days), that nearly resulted in his leg being amputated. Lajoie's solution to this was to wear white sanitary socks ("sanitaries"), but this posed another problem. The colored sock was difficult to put on with the extra white socks, so another solution came of this: a footless sock with a small arched opening at the bottom, to be called "stirrup" socks, due to their resemblance to stirrup irons used in equestrian events. The less expensive white sock could be changed more frequently. These stirrups were initially meant to mimic the solid-color socks.

Stirrup socks are worn on top of sanitary socks and serve to display team colors, stripes or team logos. For example, for several years the Minnesota Twins wore navy blue stirrups with "TC" on the side (for Twin Cities) and the Houston Astros wore either navy blue or orange stirrup socks with a star in the opposite color on the side. The stirrup sock colors were also the basis of team names, including the Cincinnati Red Stockings, Boston Red Sox and Chicago White Sox.

As the 20th century progressed, players began to wearing their stirrup loops higher and higher. By the 1970s, many players were pulling the stirrup loop so high that only the white sanitary sock and the stirrup loop itself showed, with the rest of the stirrup sock being hidden by their pants. In the 1980s, stirrups finally reached their highest point with some players showing nothing but the vertical lines of their stirrups, sold as "ribbon stirrups". Around the same time, a "two-in-one" sock was created that mimicked the look of a stirrup sock over a white sock while, in fact, only being a high white sock with a woven-on colored stripe or stirrup down each side. The minor-league Springfield Cardinals wear a two-in-one version of the traditional St. Louis Cardinals' stirrup sock and sanitary sock combination, which looks very much like the real thing. Another option used by players has been to forego stirrup socks and wear solid-color knee-high socks with knickers.

Stirrup socks were worn by most baseball players until the 1990s, when Major League Baseball (MLB) players began wearing their pants down to the ankles, setting a trend soon picked up by players at all levels, thus returning baseball to its look in the sport's formative years. Also, increasingly lax regulation of uniform codes eventually contributed to many players ignoring the traditional look. As stirrup socks were a recognizable feature of baseball uniforms for more than a century, traditionalists lament the contemporary "low pants" look in baseball uniforms. Today, players wear either their pant legs low, or if wearing high pants, stirrups or solid color stockings.

Some players, such as Chris Archer (MLB debut 2012), Francisco Lindor (MLB debut 2015), and Josh Outman (MLB debut 2008) returned to wearing real stirrup socks over sanitary socks. A trend back to knickers and high socks is also particularly evident among youth and high-school teams. In Japan, as the use of knickers is made mandatory by the Japan High School Baseball Federation, stirrups remain a popular choice of high socks among players at the high school level.

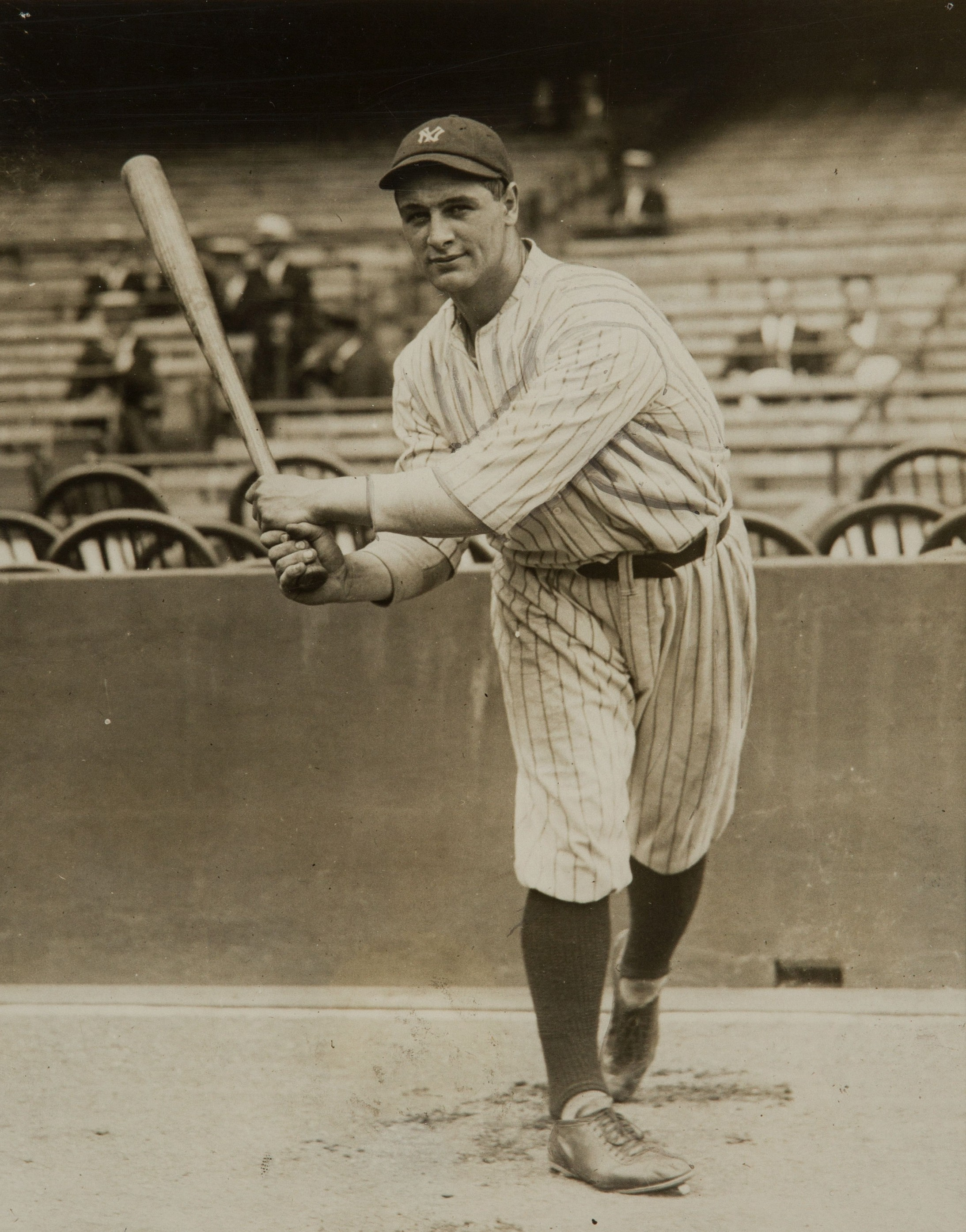
Lou Gehrig in 1923 wearing lengthy stirrup socks with short loops

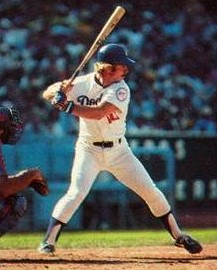
Ron Cey batting in 1981 wearing stirrup socks with long loops

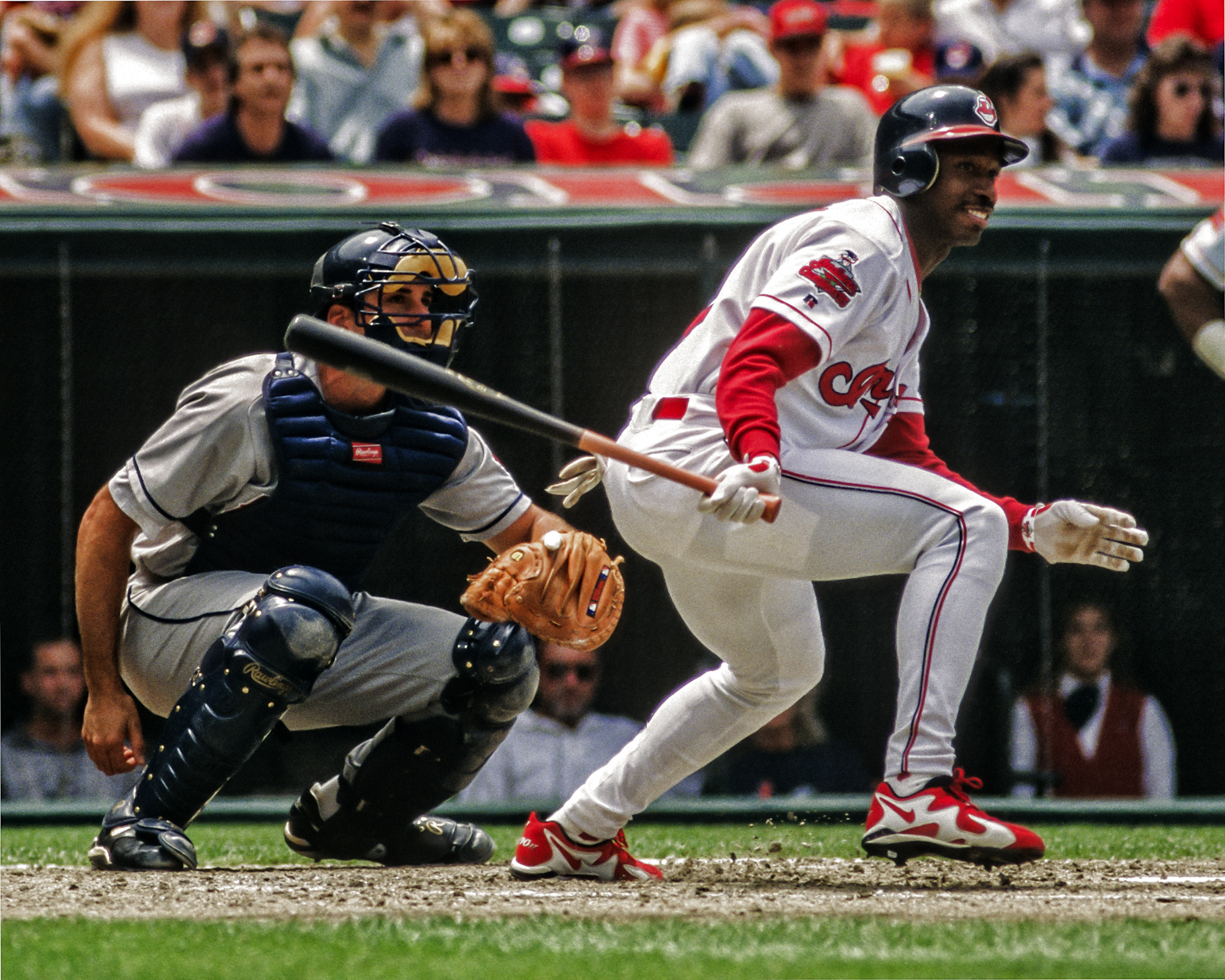
Kenny Lofton batting in 1996 wearing long pant legs

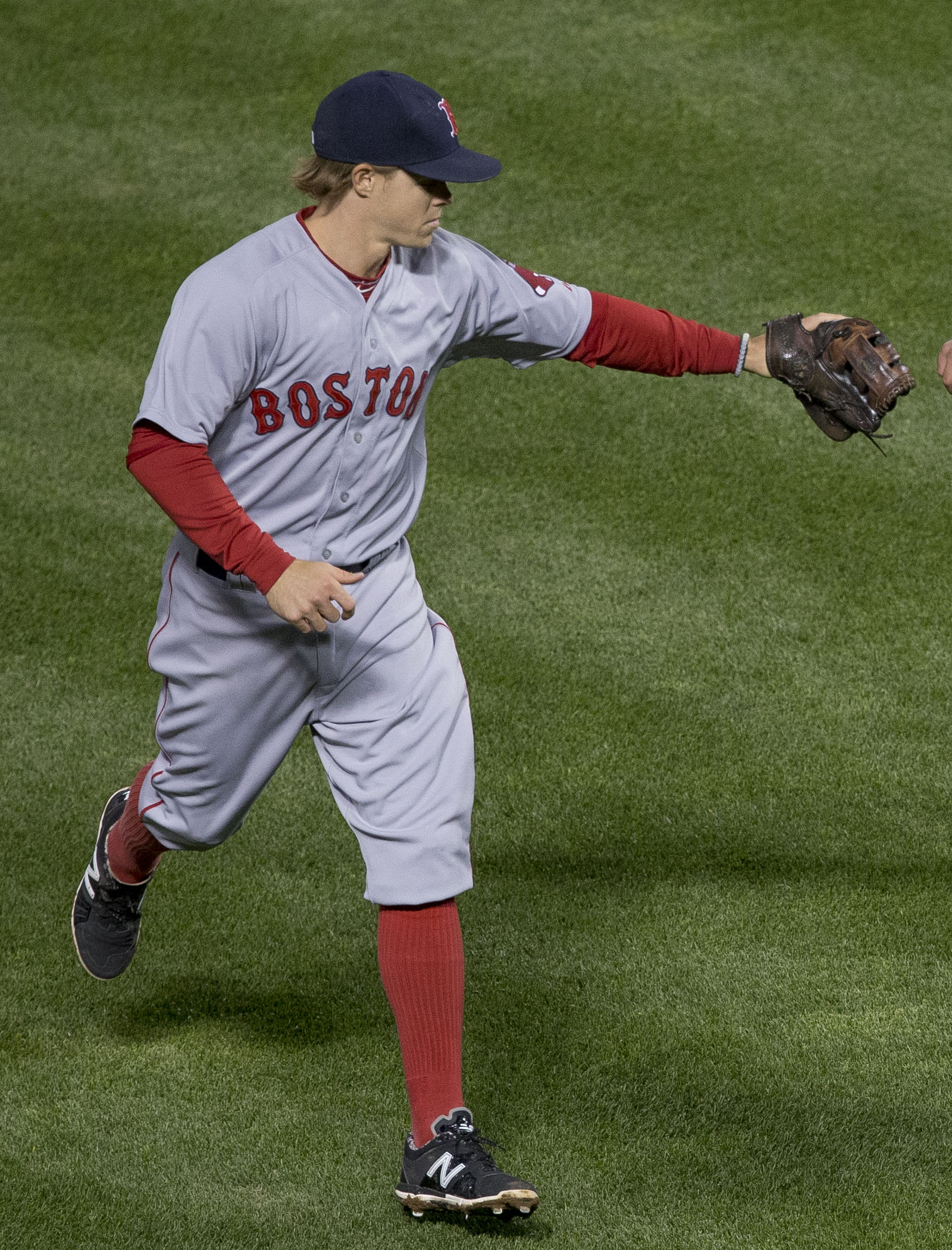
Brock Holt wearing solid-color socks with knickers in 2015

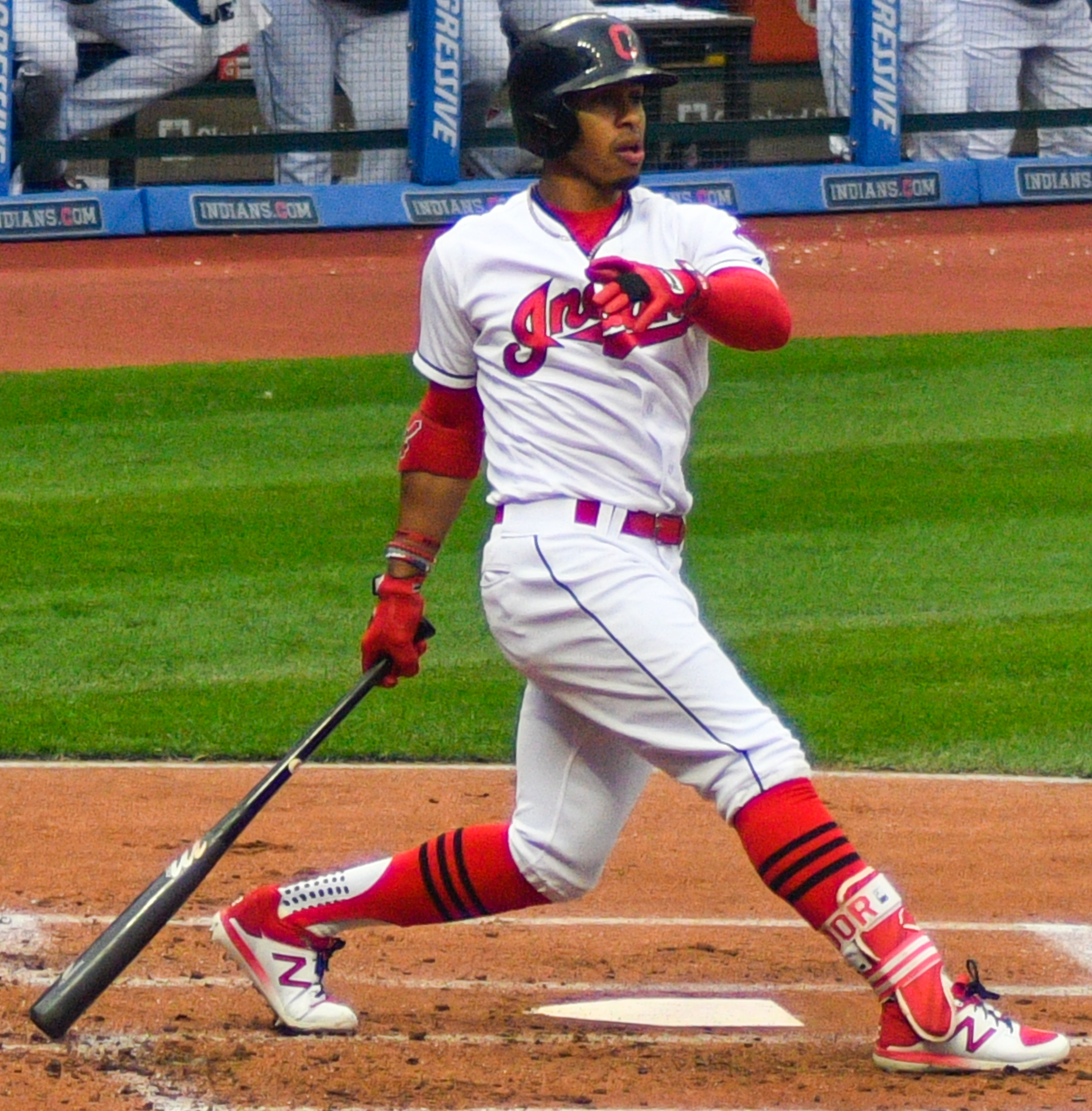
Francisco Lindor wearing stirrups in 2017

Kosuke Matsufuji of Nihon University Third High School wearing stirrups, a popular choice to pair with mandatory knickers in Japanese high school baseball

== Rules ==
While the rules of baseball are silent on stirrups, some players on a team wearing them while others are not seems to be in violation of at least two subsections of Rule 1.11(1):

§ 1 "All players on a team shall wear uniforms identical in color, trim and style, [...]"
§ 3 "No player whose uniform does not conform to that of his teammates shall be permitted to participate in a game."

For many years, teams had enforced rules so that uniforms were worn "uniformly", including the team's socks. For example, Leo Durocher, manager of the Chicago Cubs in the late 1960s, had a measuring stick in the clubhouse. Players were required to match the length of their stirrup loops to the stick at about 4 inches (10 cm), exposing only a small part of the white sanitary sock.

== Other sports ==
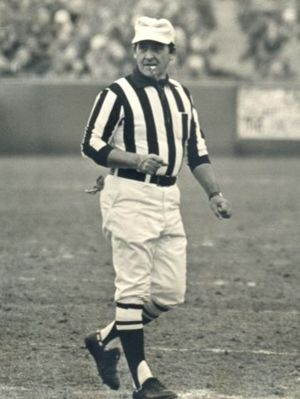
NFL official Cal Lepore wearing stirrup socks in 1977

Other sports also use, or have used, stirrup socks, but traditionally wore a white sweat sock over, instead of under, the colored stirrup game sock (e.g. basketball, football, hockey). For many years, American football officials commonly wore black baseball-style stirrups as part of their uniform (in some leagues by the 1980s, this would be replaced by one-piece stockings with the black/white stripes on the top half and a white bottom half) although this was done away with by the early 2010s as black full-length slacks replaced the traditional white knickers. There are still some sock companies manufacturing stirrup socks for baseball and other sports, including Twin City Knitting Company in Conover, North Carolina.

== See also ==
- Baseball clothing and equipment
