= Baseball uniform =

Type of uniform worn by baseball players

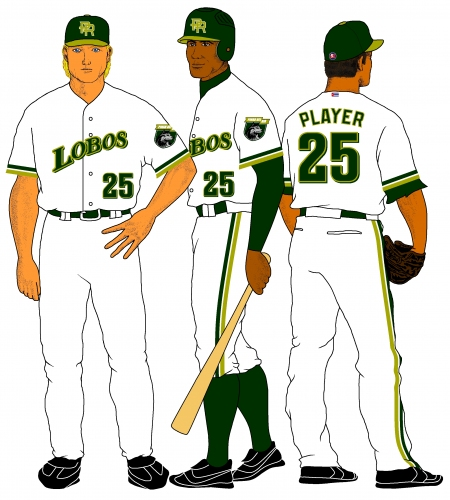
Illustration of a baseball uniform

A baseball uniform is a type of uniform worn by baseball players, coaches and managers.

Most baseball uniforms have the names and uniform numbers of players who wear them, usually on the backs of the uniforms to distinguish players from each other. Baseball shirts (jerseys), pants, shoes, socks, caps, and gloves are parts of baseball uniforms. Most uniforms have different logos and colors to aid players, officials, and spectators in distinguishing the two teams from each other and the officials.

Baseball uniforms were first worn by the New York Knickerbockers Baseball Club in 1849. Today, sales of replica uniforms and derivative branded products generate large amounts of income for Major League teams through merchandising.

== History ==
=== Early developments ===
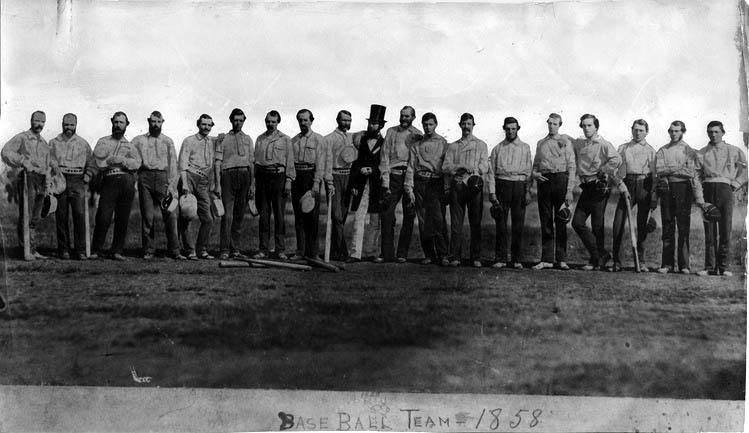
The New York Knickerbockers in 1858 wearing their baseball uniforms

The New York Knickerbockers were the first baseball team to wear uniforms, taking the field on April 4, 1849, in pants made of blue wool, white flannel shirts and straw hats.

The practice of wearing a uniform soon spread, and by 1900, all Major League Baseball teams had adopted them.

By 1882 most uniforms included stockings, which covered the leg from foot to knee, and were used to differentiate one club from another. The uniforms themselves had different colors and patterns that reflected the different baseball positions.

In the late 1880s, the Detroit Wolverines and Washington Nationals of the National League and the Brooklyn Bridegrooms of the American Association were the first to wear striped uniforms.

=== Home and road uniforms ===
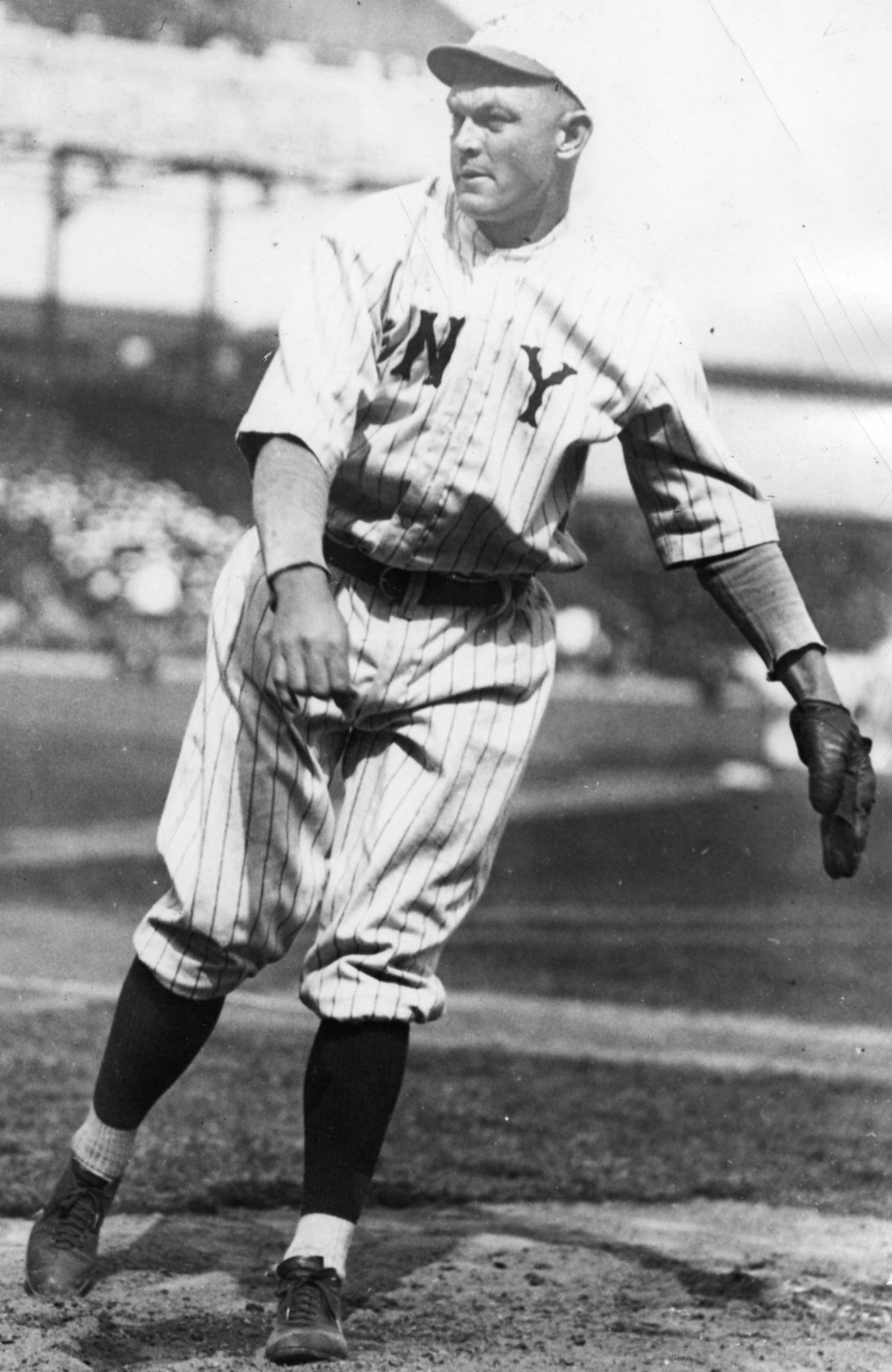
Jeff Tesreau, wearing a New York Giants pinstriped baseball uniform, c.1912–18

By the end of the 19th century, teams began the practice of wearing one of two different uniforms, one when they played in their own baseball stadium and a different one when they played on the road. It became common to wear white at home and one of gray, solid dark blue, or black on the road. An early example of this is the Brooklyn Superbas, who started to use a blue pattern for their road uniforms in 1907.

In 1916, on the New York Giants' road uniforms, purple lines gave their uniforms a tartan-like effect, and another kind of road uniform was a solid dark blue or black material with white around this time. The Kansas City Athletics' home and road uniforms were changed by Charles O. Finley in 1963, to the colors of gold and green. Some teams used light blue for their road uniforms from the 1970s to the early 1990s. Early striped patterns developed into long stripes along the length of the uniforms, called pinstriping. This was first worn on some major league baseball team's uniforms in 1907, and the pinstripes were then widened in 1912, so that the crowd could see them more clearly. The Chicago Cubs were wearing pinstripes in 1907. The Brooklyn Bridegrooms used checked uniforms in 1889, and brought them back in 1907 (as the Superbas) and 1916–1917 (as the Robins). Satin uniforms were developed by several teams including the Brooklyn Dodgers for night games, as the sheen of the fabric was more reflective and thus easier to see. Pinstripes were commonly worn on the uniforms of the New York Yankees. Legend had it that the stripes were adopted to make Babe Ruth look slimmer, but since the Yankees had already been wearing pinstripes a few years before Ruth played for them in 1920, the legend is most likely a myth. The Yankees' pinstripes on their home uniforms soon became a team symbol.

In 1916, the Cleveland Indians became the first team to add numbers on their uniforms, positioned on the left sleeve of the home uniforms only. (Okkonen, p. 36, p. 120) In 1929, numbers were first added on the backs of uniforms by the New York Yankees and the Cleveland Indians. By 1932, all major league baseball teams had numbers on their players' uniforms. The Brooklyn Dodgers, in 1952, became the first baseball team to add numbers to the fronts of their uniforms. In 1960, the Chicago White Sox were the first team to place players' names on the back of their jerseys, doing so on their road jerseys; within a few years, this practice became almost universal in MLB, though to this day the Yankees have only worn names on their uniforms for the 2017-19 version of Players Weekend, where alternate uniforms with nicknames were used.

In most parts of the world, numbers are no more than two digits long; however, Japanese players who are on their team's developmental roster have three-digit numbers. Major league teams typically assign the highest numbers (#50 and above) in spring training to the players who are not expected to make the regular-season roster; hence the lower numbers are considered more prestigious, although there are many veterans who wear high numbers anyway. Two Hall of Famers who wore high numbers are Don Drysdale, who wore #53 for the Brooklyn and Los Angeles Dodgers, and Carlton Fisk, who wore #72 for the Chicago White Sox (reverse of the #27 he wore with the Boston Red Sox; Fisk also was the American League Rookie of the Year in 1972).

Controversy over major league baseball teams' newly redesigned uniforms erupted during spring training in 2024. Major League Baseball debuted a slate of new uniforms that were designed by Nike and manufactured by Fanatics. Many players were upset with the way the jerseys looked, saying that the smaller numbers and letters made them feel as if they were wearing replicas. One player complained that the team name on jerseys for the Philadelphia Phillies was off-center. Concerns about the new uniform pants included the observation that tucked in jerseys were visible through home white pants. In response, Nike issued a statement saying that "We will continue to work with MLB, the players, and our manufacturing partner to address player uniforms."

=== Cap styles ===
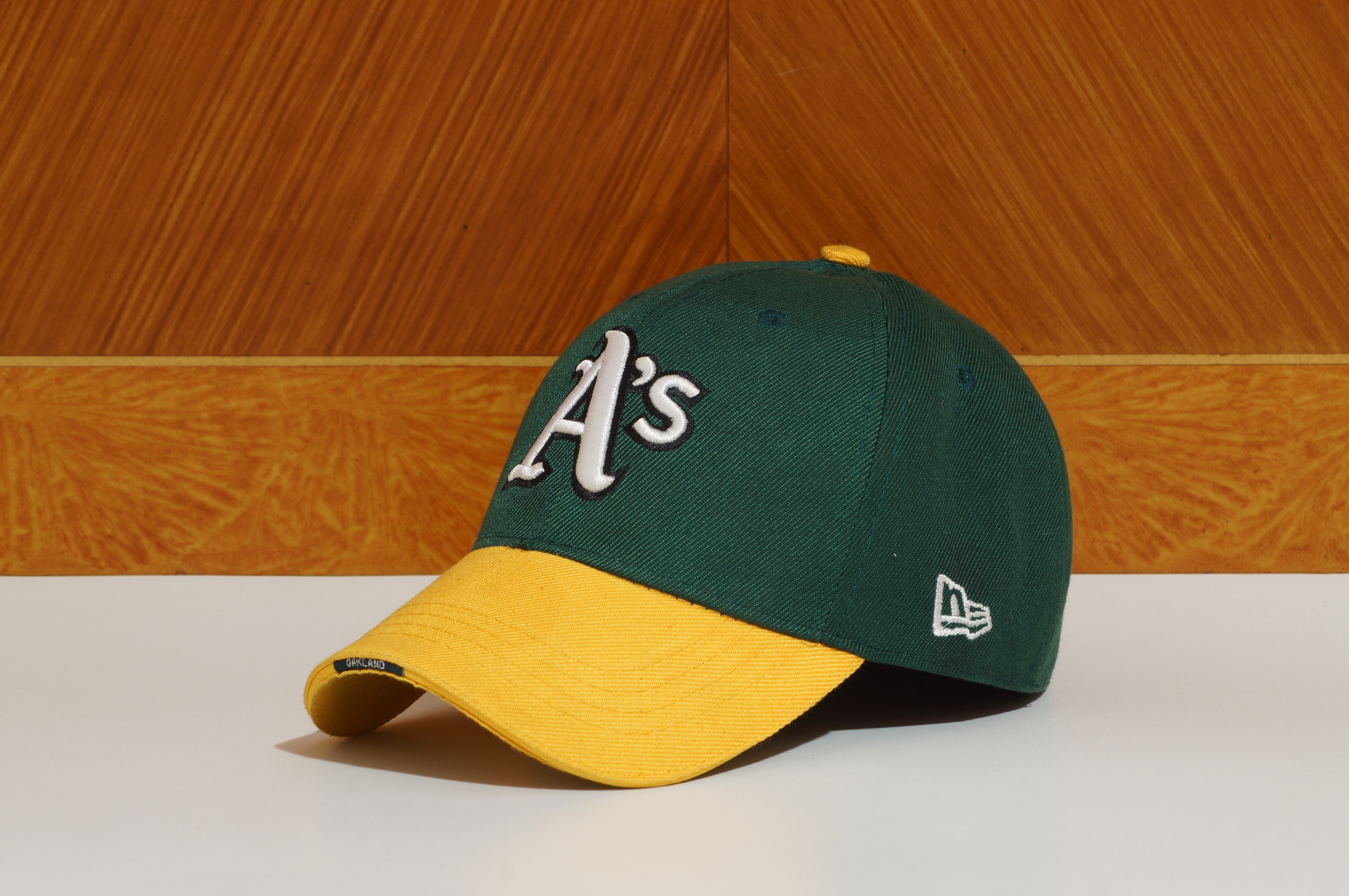
Oakland Athletics unofficial baseball cap

Caps, or other types of headgear with eye-shades, have been a part of baseball uniforms from the beginning.

From the 1840s to the 1870s, baseball players wore various types of hats, or even no cap at all, since there was no official rule regarding headgear. Examples included full-brimmed straw hats such as boating caps, jockey caps, cycling caps, and flat-topped caps.

The Brooklyn Excelsiors was the first team to wear what would later become the modern baseball cap, with its distinctive rounded top and peak, in the 1860s. By the early years of the twentieth century, this style of cap had become common, but some teams occasionally revived the flat-topped cap, such as the New York Giants in 1916 and the Pittsburgh Pirates as recently as during the 1979 World Series. Over time, the peak has enlarged slightly to further protect the player's eyes from the sun. More recently, players have worn hats with fold-down ear flaps in cold weather.

=== Shoes ===
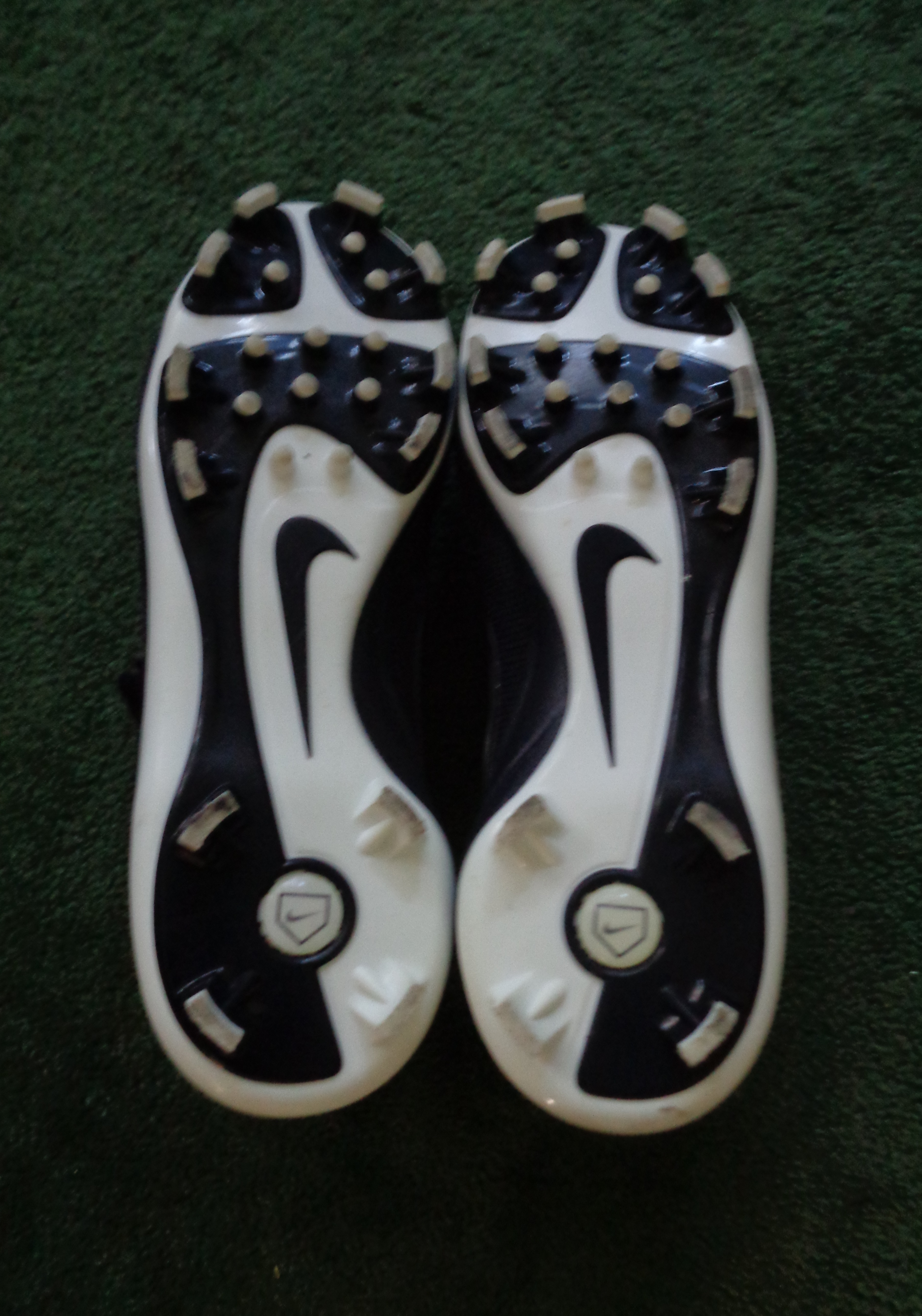
Soles of Nike baseball shoes

In the late 19th century, soft but durable leather shoes were the preferred choice of baseball players.

In the 1970s, as artificial turf became prominent on developed countries' baseball fields, modifications to footwear became necessary. Detachable spikes became popular in the 20th century, as they helped players to avoid slipping, especially on turf, but they were banned in 1976.

In the 19th century and the first part of the 20th, baseball shoes were commonly black in color. In the 1960s, the Kansas City Athletics began wearing revolutionary white shoes, a tradition carried over when they moved to Oakland. Since then, some teams are wearing colored cleats corresponding to their team colors. For example, the Philadelphia Phillies and St. Louis Cardinals now wear red cleats, the Chicago Cubs and the Los Angeles Dodgers wear blue cleats, and some of the San Francisco Giants players wear orange cleats. In recent years, however, players are now allowed to wear cleats regardless of team color, and often customize them as a form of self-expression.

=== Stockings and pants ===
See footnote and Baseball stirrups

Inspired by the Cincinnati Red Stockings, the stocking colors of teams in the 1860s onward were a principal device in distinguishing one team from another (hence team names such as the Chicago White Stockings, St. Louis Brown Stockings (or Browns), etc.). Except for a few "candy-cane" varieties (particularly by the New York Giants, St. Louis Cardinals and Washington Senators), striping was quite minimal during the 1920s and, in contrast, a revival of other sorts in the early 1930s.

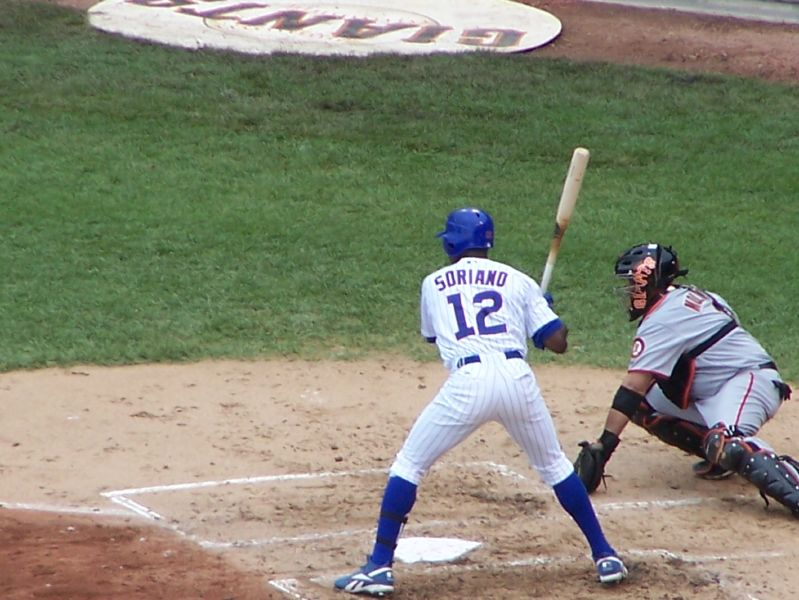
Alfonso Soriano wearing traditional knee-breeches

By the 1990s, new styles of close-trimmed pants legs made it possible for players to wear pants that ran clear to the shoetops, in lieu of the traditional knee-breeches style that had prevailed for generations. This led to a violation of the literal concept of a "uniform", in that different players on a given team might wear knee-length and full-length pants on the field at the same time. Players such as Manny Ramirez took this fashion trend to an extreme, wearing loose-fitting pants whose legs nearly lapped under the heels of the shoes. Some, such as Gary Sheffield, even developed straps that hooked under the cleats. Meanwhile, players such as Alfonso Soriano continued to wear the traditional knee-breeches, though most of these players still lacked the traditional stirrups.

By the end of the first decade of the 21st century, nearly all players wore either traditional knee-high socks or pants that covered the shoetops and contained no elastic in the bottom. Such loose-fitting pants were called "pro-flare", as they are worn by most major league players. However, a few older players, like Derek Jeter, wore pants that stopped right at the shoes, like the style of the late 1990s/early 2000s.

In recent years teams that wear throwback uniforms usually outfit themselves with stirrups or knee-breeches, to simulate the look of a particular era. In addition, some teams began to wear stockings with stripes. Examples include the Tampa Bay Rays sporting Columbia blue and white striping on their navy stockings, the St. Louis Cardinals with navy and white stripes on their red stockings, and the San Francisco Giants in black stockings with orange stripes.

=== Graphics and logos ===
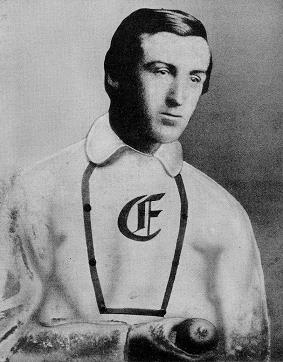
Jim Creighton sporting an Old English "E" for his team, Excelsior, ca.1860–1862

From the beginning, graphic designs were used to identify teams. Often an Old English letter was worn on the chest. This style survives with the Detroit Tigers and their gothic style "D" on their home jerseys and caps and the Athletics, who currently have an Old English "A" on their caps.

As official nicknames gained prominence in the early 1900s (in contrast to media-generated and unofficial nicknames of prior generations), pictorial logos began emerging as part of the team's marketing. Some early examples include a small red tiger on the black cap of the 1901 Detroit Tigers, as they were officially the Tigers from the beginning; and a bear cub logo on the Chicago Cubs shirts by 1907, as that unofficial nickname was then adopted officially by the club.

In another famous example, the Boston Americans (an unofficial designation that merely distinguished them from their across-the-tracks rivals) adopted the Nationals' abandoned red stockings in 1908, and have been the Boston Red Sox officially ever since then.

By the 1930s, nearly every team had distinctive logos, letters or the team nickname on their home shirts, as part of the team's marketing. The trend of the city name on the road jerseys continued. In recent years, with team nicknames being so strongly associated with the clubs, logos that were once only used at home also turned up on road jerseys, in place of city names.

=== Non-player uniforms ===
Baseball is unique among team sports in that a team's non-playing staff (including managers, coaches, bullpen catchers, batboys, and ball boys) wear the same uniforms as the team's players, with their own assigned uniform numbers; this is an vestigial remnant of when players on a team often held a dual role of being a player-manager.

== Notes ==
- Okkonen, Marc (1991). Baseball Uniforms of the 20th Century: The Official Major League Baseball Guide.
