= List of Zimbabwe Test cricket records =

Test cricket is the oldest form of cricket played at international level. A Test match is scheduled to take place over a period of five days, (Note: For the first 50 years of Test cricket matches were played over three or four days and until the 1930s some timeless Tests were played.) (Note: In October 2017, the ICC Board approved a trial of four-day Test cricket to run through until the 2019 Cricket World Cup.) and is played by teams representing full member nations of the International Cricket Council (ICC).

Zimbabwe played their first test match in 1992, becoming the ninth test nation. Since then, they have played 130 test matches, compiling a record of 16 wins, 30 draws, and 84 defeats. As of June 2026, Zimbabwe's win percentage of 12.30% is the lowest of any nation that has played test matches to this day. Despite being a test nation since 1992, they accepted a voluntary suspension from test cricket in 2005, and did not play test cricket again until 2011.

This is a list of Zimbabwe Test cricket records. It is based on the List of Test cricket records, but concentrates solely on records dealing with Zimbabwean Test cricket team, and any cricketers who have played for that team.

== Key ==
The top five records are listed for each category, except for the team wins, losses, draws and ties and the partnership records. Tied records for fifth place are also included. Explanations of the general symbols and cricketing terms used in the list are given below. Specific details are provided in each category where appropriate. All records include matches played for Zimbabwe only, and are correct as of June 2020.

Key
Symbol	Meaning
†	Player or umpire is currently active in Test cricket
*	Player remained not out or partnership remained unbroken
♠	Test cricket record
d	Innings was declared (e.g. 8/758d)
Date	Starting date of the Test match
Innings	Number of innings played
Matches	Number of matches played
Opposition	The team India was playing against
Period	The time period when the player was active in Test cricket
Player	The player involved in the record
Venue	Test cricket ground where the match was played

== Team records ==
=== Team wins, losses, draws and ties ===
As of June 2026, Zimbabwe played 131 Test matches resulting in 16 victories, 84 defeats and 31 draws for an overall winning percentage of 12.21%.

Opponent	Matches	Won	Lost	Drawn	Tied	% Won	Period
Afghanistan	5	2	2	1	0	40.00	2021–2025
Australia	3	0	3	0	0	0.00	1999–2003
Bangladesh	21	9	9	3	0	42.86	2001–2026
England	7	0	4	3	0	0.00	1996–2025
India	11	2	7	2	0	18.18	1992–2005
Ireland	2	0	2	0	0	0.00	2024–2025
New Zealand	17	0	13	6	0	0.00	1992–2016
Pakistan	19	3	12	4	0	15.78	1993–2021
South Africa	10	0	10	1	0	0.00	1995–2025
Sri Lanka	20	0	14	6	0	0.00	1994–2020
West Indies	12	0	8	4	0	0.00	2000–2023
Total	130	16	84	30	0	12.30	1992–2026
Last updated: 1 July 2025

=== First Test series wins ===
Opponent	Year of first Home win	Year of first Away win
Afghanistan	YTP	-
Australia	-	-
Bangladesh	2001	2002
England	-	-
India	1998	-
Ireland	YTP	-
New Zealand	-	-
Pakistan	-	1998
South Africa	-	-
Sri Lanka	-	-
West Indies	-	-
Last updated: 30 June 2020

=== First Test match wins ===
Opponent	Home		Away	
Opponent	Venue	Year	Venue	Year
Afghanistan	YTP	YTP	Abu Dhabi	2021
Australia	-	-	-	-
Bangladesh	Bulawayo	2001	Chittagong	2001
England	-	-	-	-
India	Harare	1998	-	-
Ireland	YTP	YTP	-	-
New Zealand	-	-	-	-
Pakistan	Harare	1995	Peshawar	1998
South Africa	-	-	-	-
Sri Lanka	-	-	-	-
West Indies	-	-	-	-
Last updated: 3 March 2021

=== Team scoring records ===
==== Most runs in an innings ====
Rank	Score	Opposition	Venue	Date
1	586	Afghanistan	Queens Sports Club, Bulawayo, Zimbabwe	26 December 2024
2	563/9d	West Indies	Harare Sports Club, Harare, Zimbabwe	27 July 2001
3	544/4d	Pakistan	Harare Sports Club, Harare, Zimbabwe	31 January 1995
4	542/7d	Bangladesh	MA Aziz Stadium, Chittagong, Bangladesh	15 November 2001
5	507/9d	West Indies	Harare Sports Club, Harare, Zimbabwe	4 November 2003
Last updated: 30 June 2020

==== Highest successful run chases ====
Rank	Score	Target	Opposition	Venue	Date
1	174/7	174	Bangladesh	Sylhet International Cricket Stadium, Sylhet, Bangladesh	20 April 2025
2	162/3	162	Pakistan	Arbab Niaz Stadium, Peshawar, Pakistan	27 November 1998
3	157/6	157	India	Harare Sports Club, Harare, Zimbabwe	15 June 1998
4	100/2	100	Bangladesh	Harare Sports Club, Harare, Zimbabwe	26 April 2001
5	17/0	17	Afghanistan	Sheikh Zayed Cricket Stadium, Abu Dhabi, United Arab Emirates	2 March 2021
Last updated: 23 April 2025

==== Fewest runs in an innings ====
Rank	Score	Opposition	Venue	Date
1	51	New Zealand	McLean Park, Napier, New Zealand	26 January 2012
2	54	South Africa	Newlands, Cape Town, South Africa	4 March 2005
3	59	New Zealand	Harare Sports Club, Harare, Zimbabwe	7 August 2005
4	63	West Indies	Queen's Park Oval, Port of Spain, Trinidad & Tobago	16 March 2000
5	68	South Africa	St George's Park, Port Elizabeth, South Africa	26 December 2017
Last updated: 30 June 2020

==== Most runs conceded in an innings ====
Rank	Score	Opposition	Venue	Date
1	735/6d	Australia	WACA Ground, Perth, Australia	9 October 2003
2	713/3d	Sri Lanka	Queens Sports Club, Bulawayo, Zimbabwe	14 May 2004
3	609/6d	India	Vidarbha Cricket Association Ground, Nagpur, India	25 November 2000
4	600/3d	South Africa	Harare Sports Club, Harare, Zimbabwe	7 September 2001
5	586/6d	Sri Lanka	Sinhalese Sports Club Ground, Colombo, Sri Lanka	27 December 2001
Last updated: 23 August 2020

==== Fewest runs conceded in an innings ====
Rank	Score	Opposition	Venue	Date
1	103	Pakistan	Arbab Niaz Stadium, Peshawar, Pakistan	27 November 1998
2	107	Bangladesh	Bangabandhu National Stadium, Dhaka, Bangladesh	8 November 2001
3	128	West Indies	Queens Sports Club, Bulawayo, Zimbabwe	12 November 2003
4	131	Afghanistan	Sheikh Zayed Cricket Stadium, Abu Dhabi, United Arab Emirates	2 March 2021
5	134	Bangladesh	Harare Sports Club, Harare, Zimbabwe	17 April 2013
Last updated: 3 March 2021

=== Result records ===
==== Greatest win margins (by innings) ====
Rank	Margin	Opposition	Venue	Date
1	Innings and 85 runs	Bangladesh	Harare Sports Club, Harare, Zimbabwe	30 June 2026
2	Innings and 73 runs	Afghanistan	Harare Sports Club, Harare, Zimbabwe	22 October 2025
3	Innings and 64 runs	Pakistan	Harare Sports Club, Harare, Zimbabwe	31 January 1995
4	Innings and 32 runs	Bangladesh	Queens Sports Club, Bulawayo, Zimbabwe	19 April 2001
Last updated: 24 July 2026

==== Greatest win margins (by runs) ====
Rank	Margin	Opposition	Venue	Date
1	335 runs	Bangladesh	Harare Sports Club, Harare, Zimbabwe	17 April 2013
2	183 runs	Bangladesh	Harare Sports Club, Harare, Zimbabwe	19 February 2004
3	151 runs	Bangladesh	Sylhet International Cricket Stadium, Sylhet, Bangladesh	3 November 2018
4	130 runs	Bangladesh	Harare Sports Club, Harare, Zimbabwe	11 August 2011
5	61 runs	India	Harare Sports Club, Harare, Zimbabwe	7 October 1998
Last updated: 30 June 2020

==== Greatest win margins (by wickets) ====
Rank	Margin	Opposition	Venue	Date
1	10 wickets	Afghanistan	Sheikh Zayed Cricket Stadium, Abu Dhabi, United Arab Emirates	2 March 2021
2	8 wickets	Bangladesh	Harare Sports Club, Harare, Zimbabwe	26 April 2001
2	8 wickets	Bangladesh	MA Aziz Stadium, Chittagong, Bangladesh	15 November 2001
4	7 wickets	Pakistan	Arbab Niaz Stadium, Peshawar, Pakistan	27 November 1998
5	4 wickets	India	Harare Sports Club, Harare, Zimbabwe	15 June 1998
Last updated: 3 March 2021

==== Narrowest win margins (by runs) ====
Rank	Margin	Opposition	Venue	Date
1	24 runs	Pakistan	Harare Sports Club, Harare, Zimbabwe	10 September 2013
2	61 runs	India	Harare Sports Club, Harare, Zimbabwe	7 October 1998
3	130 runs	Bangladesh	Harare Sports Club, Harare, Zimbabwe	11 August 2011
4	151 runs	Bangladesh	Sylhet International Cricket Stadium, Sylhet, Bangladesh	3 November 2018
5	183 runs	Bangladesh	Harare Sports Club, Harare, Zimbabwe	19 February 2004
Last updated: 30 June 2020

==== Narrowest win margins (by wickets) ====
Rank	Margin	Opposition	Venue	Date
1	3 wickets	Bangladesh	Sylhet International Cricket Stadium, Sylhet, Bangladesh	20 April 2025
2	4 wickets	India	Harare Sports Club, Harare, Zimbabwe	15 June 1998
3	7 wickets	Pakistan	Arbab Niaz Stadium, Peshawar, Pakistan	27 November 1998
4	8 wickets	Bangladesh	Harare Sports Club, Harare, Zimbabwe	26 April 2001
4	8 wickets	Bangladesh	MA Aziz Stadium, Chittagong, Bangladesh	15 November 2001
Last updated: 23 April 2025

==== Greatest loss margins (by innings) ====
Rank	Margin	Opposition	Venue	Date
1	Innings and 359 runs	New Zealand	Queens Sports Club, Bulawayo, Zimbabwe	9 August 2025
2	Innings and 301 runs	New Zealand	McLean Park, Napier, New Zealand	26 January 2012
3	Innings and 294 runs	New Zealand	Harare Sports Club, Harare, Zimbabwe	7 August 2005
4	Innings and 254 runs	England	Queens Sports Club, Bulawayo, Zimbabwe	14 May 2004
5	Innings and 240 runs	England	Harare Sports Club, Harare, Zimbabwe	6 May 2004
Last updated: 9 August 2025

==== Greatest loss margins (by runs) ====
Rank	Margin	Opposition	Venue	Date
1	328 runs	South Africa	Queens Sports Club, Bulawayo, Zimbabwe	1 July 2025
2	315 runs	Sri Lanka	Galle International Stadium, Galle, Sri Lanka	12 January 2002
3	257 runs	Sri Lanka	Harare Sports Club, Harare, Zimbabwe	6 November 2016
4	254 runs	New Zealand	Queens Sports Club, Bulawayo, Zimbabwe	6 August 2016
5	226 runs	Bangladesh	MA Aziz Stadium, Chittagong, Bangladesh	6 January 2005
Last updated: 1 July 2025

==== Greatest loss margins (by 10 wickets) ====
Rank	Number of Defeats	Opposition	Most Recent Venue	Date
1	2	Pakistan	Queens Sports Club, Bulawayo, Zimbabwe	16 November 2002
1	2	Sri Lanka	Harare Sports Club, Harare, Zimbabwe	19 January 2020
2	1	New Zealand	Basin Reserve, Wellington, New Zealand	19 February 1998
2	1	Australia	Harare Sports Club, Harare, Zimbabwe	14 October 1999
2	1	West Indies	Sabina Park, Kingston, Jamaica	24 March 2000
2	1	India	Harare Sports Club, Harare, Zimbabwe	20 September 2005
Last updated: 30 June 2020

==== Narrowest loss margins (by runs) ====
Rank	Margin	Opposition	Venue	Date
1	34 runs	New Zealand	Queens Sports Club, Bulawayo, Zimbabwe	11 November 2011
2	35 runs	West Indies	Queen's Park Oval, Port of Spain, Trinidad & Tobago	16 March 2000
3	52 runs	Pakistan	Rawalpindi Cricket Stadium, Rawalpindi, Pakistan	9 December 1993
4	99 runs	Pakistan	Harare Sports Club, Harare, Zimbabwe	15 February 1995
5	117 runs	West Indies	Queens Sports Club, Bulawayo, Zimbabwe	21 October 2017
Last updated: 30 June 2020

==== Narrowest loss margins (by wickets) ====
Rank	Margin	Opposition	Venue	Date
1	3 wickets	Pakistan	Harare Sports Club, Harare, Zimbabwe	21 March 1998
1	3 wickets	Bangladesh	Shere Bangla National Stadium, Mirpur, Bangladesh	25 October 2014
3	4 wickets	India	Arun Jaitley Stadium, Delhi, India	28 February 2002
3	4 wickets	Sri Lanka	R Premadasa Stadium, Colombo, Sri Lanka	14 July 2017
5	5 wickets	Sri Lanka	Sinhalese Sports Club Ground, Colombo, Sri Lanka	14 January 1998
Last updated: 30 June 2020

== Individual records ==
=== Batting records ===
==== Most career runs ====
Rank	Runs	Player	Matches	Innings	Period
1	4,794	Andy Flower	63	112	1992–2002
2	3,457	Grant Flower	67	123	1992–2004
3	2,858	Alistair Campbell	60	109	1992–2002
4	2,403	Brendan Taylor†	36	71	2004–2025
5	2,223	Hamilton Masakadza	38	76	2001–2018
6	2,207	Guy Whittall	46	82	1993–2002
7	1,990	Heath Streak	65	107	1993–2005
8	1,946	Sean Williams†	24	47	2013–2025
9	1,931	Craig Ervine†	31	61	2011–2025
10	1,615	Stuart Carlisle	37	66	1995–2005
Last updated: 20 October 2025

==== Fastest runs getter ====
Runs	Batsman	Match	Innings	Record Date	Reference
1000	David Houghton	15	24	13 January 1996	
2000	Andy Flower	31	55	7 October 1998	
3000	Andy Flower	45	81	19 September 2000	
4000	Andy Flower	53	93	7 September 2001	
Last updated: 30 June 2020

==== Most runs against each team ====
Opposition	Runs	Player	Matches	Innings	Period	Ref
Afghanistan	518	Sean Williams†	4	7	2021–2025	
Australia	179	Trevor Gripper	3	6	1999–2003	
Bangladesh	1,239	Brendan Taylor	12	24	2005–2021	
England	200	Andy Flower	4	6	1996–2000	
India	1,138	Andy Flower	9	18	1992–2002	
Ireland	86	Prince Masvaure†	1	2	2024–2024	
New Zealand	780	Grant Flower	10	20	1992–2000	
Pakistan	961	Grant Flower	14	26	1993–2002	
South Africa	566	Andy Flower	5	10	1995–2001	
Sri Lanka	778	Andy Flower	13	23	1994–2002	
West Indies	428	Hamilton Masakadza	5	10	2001–2017	
Last updated: 3 January 2025.

==== Most runs in each batting position ====
Batting position	Batsman	Innings	Runs	Average	Test Career Span	Ref
Opener	Grant Flower	84	2,373	29.29	1992–2000	
Number 3	Hamilton Masakadza	36	1,221	35.91	2001–2016	
Number 4	Brendan Taylor	38	1,499	41.63	2011–2021	
Number 5	Andy Flower	82	3,788	54.90	1992–2002	
Number 6	Sikandar Raza†	18	783	43.50	2016–2021	
Number 7	Heath Streak	30	744	25.65	1996–2005	
Number 8	Heath Streak	44	789	20.76	1993–2005	
Number 9	Heath Streak	23	386	25.73	1993–2003	
Number 10	Bryan Strang	23	265	15.58	1995–2001	
Number 11	Christopher Mpofu	25	105	7.00	2005–2017	
Last updated: 10 May 2021. Qualification: Batted 20 Innings at the position

==== Highest individual score ====
Rank	Runs	Player	Opposition	Venue	Date
1	266	David Houghton	Sri Lanka	Queens Sports Club, Bulawayo, Zimbabwe	20 October 1994
2	232*	Andy Flower	India	Vidarbha Cricket Association Ground, Nagpur, India	25 November 2000
3	203*	Guy Whittall	New Zealand	Queens Sports Club, Bulawayo, Zimbabwe	25 September 1997
4	201*	Grant Flower	Pakistan	Harare Sports Club, Harare, Zimbabwe	31 January 1995
5	199*	Andy Flower	South Africa	Harare Sports Club, Harare, Zimbabwe	7 September 2001
Last updated: 30 June 2020

==== Highest individual score – progression of record ====
Runs	Player	Opponent	Venue	Season
121	David Houghton	India	Harare Sports Club, Harare, Zimbabwe	1992–93
266	David Houghton	Sri Lanka	Queens Sports Club, Bulawayo, Zimbabwe	1994–95
Last updated: 30 June 2020

==== Highest individual score against each team ====
Opposition	Runs	Player	Venue	Date	Ref
Afghanistan	154	Sean Williams	Queens Sports Club, Bulawayo, Zimbabwe	26 December 2024	
Australia	118	Stuart Carlisle	Sydney Cricket Ground, Sydney, Australia	17 October 2003	
Bangladesh	171	Brendan Taylor	Harare Sports Club, Harare, Zimbabwe	17 April 2013	
England	148*	Murray Goodwin	Trent Bridge, Nottingham, England	1 June 2000	
India	232*	Andy Flower	Vidarbha Cricket Association Ground, Nagpur, India	25 November 2000	
Ireland	YTP				
New Zealand	203*	Guy Whittall	Queens Sports Club, Bulawayo, Zimbabwe	25 September 1997	
Pakistan	201*	Grant Flower	Harare Sports Club, Harare, Zimbabwe	31 January 1995	
South Africa	199*	Andy Flower	Harare Sports Club, Harare, Zimbabwe	7 September 2001	
Sri Lanka	266	David Houghton	Queens Sports Club, Bulawayo, Zimbabwe	24 October 1994	
West Indies	147	Hamilton Masakadza	Queens Sports Club, Bulawayo, Zimbabwe	29 October 2017	
Last updated: 26 December 2024

==== Highest career average ====
Rank	Average	Player	Innings	Runs	Not out	Period
1	51.54	Andy Flower	112	4,794	19	1992–2002
2	45.25	Sean Williams†	47	1,946	4	2013–2025
3	43.05	David Houghton	36	1,464	2	1992–1997
4	42.84	Murray Goodwin	37	1,414	4	1998–2000
5	35.86	Brendan Taylor†	71	2,403	4	2004–2025
Qualification: 20 innings. Last updated: 20 October 2025

==== Highest Average in each batting position ====
Batting position	Batsman	Innings	Runs	Average	Career Span	Ref
Opener	Tino Mawoyo	21	615	30.75	2011–2016	
Number 3	Murray Goodwin	32	1,109	38.24	1998–2000	
Number 4	David Houghton	26	1,169	46.76	1993–1996	
Number 5	Andy Flower	82	3,788	54.90	1992–2002	
Number 6	Grant Flower	20	653	34.36	1992–2004	
Number 7	Heath Streak	30	744	25.65	1993–2005	
Number 8	Paul Strang	23	534	33.37	1995–2000	
Number 9	Heath Streak	23	386	25.73	1993–2003	
Number 10	Bryan Strang	23	265	15.58	1995–2001	
Number 11	Christopher Mpofu	25	105	7.00	2005–2017	
Last updated: 1 July 2020. Qualification: Min 20 innings batted at position

==== Most half-centuries ====
Rank	Half centuries	Player	Innings	Runs	Period
1	27	Andy Flower	112	4,794	1992–2002
2	18	Alistair Campbell	109	2,858	1992–2002
3	15	Grant Flower	123	3,457	1992–2004
4	12	Tatenda Taibu	54	1,546	2001–2012
4	12	Brendan Taylor†	71	2,403	2004–2025
Last updated: 11 July 2021

==== Most centuries ====
Rank	Centuries	Player	Innings	Runs	Period
1	12	Andy Flower	112	4,794	1992–2002
2	6	Grant Flower	123	3,457	1992–2004
2	6	Brendan Taylor†	71	2,403	2004–2025
2	6	Sean Williams†	47	1,946	2013–2025
5	5	Hamilton Masakadza	76	2,223	2001–2018
Last updated: 8 July 2025

==== Most double centuries ====
Rank	Double centuries	Player	Innings	Runs	Period
1	1	David Houghton	36	1,464	1992–1997
1	1	Grant Flower	123	3,457	1992–2004
1	1	Guy Whittall	82	2,207	1993–2002
1	1	Andy Flower	112	4,794	1992–2002
Last updated: 30 June 2020

==== Most triple centuries ====
No Zimbabwe batsmen has scored a triple century yet in Test cricket.

==== Most Sixes ====
Rank	Sixes	Player	Innings	Runs	Period
1	23	Andy Blignaut	36	886	2001–2005
1	23	Hamilton Masakadza	76	2,223	2009–2018
3	22	Brendan Taylor†	71	2,403	2004–2025
4	20	Andy Flower	112	4,794	1992–2002
5	17	Sikandar Raza†	35	1,286	2013–2025
Last updated: 5 January 2024

==== Most Fours ====
Rank	Sixes	Player	Innings	Runs	Period
1	543	Andy Flower	112	4,794	1992–2002
2	355	Alistair Campbell	109	2,858	1992–2002
3	349	Grant Flower	123	3,457	1992–2004
4	267	Brendan Taylor†	71	2,403	2004–2025
5	264	Hamilton Masakadza	76	2,223	2009–2018
Last updated: 20 October 2025

==== Most runs in a series ====
Rank	Runs	Player	Matches	Innings	Series
1	540	Andy Flower	2	4	Zimbabwean cricket team in India in 2000-01
2	466	David Houghton	3	3	Sri Lankan cricket team in Zimbabwe in 1994-95
3	422	Andy Flower	2	4	South African cricket team in Zimbabwe in 2001-02
4	388	Andy Flower	3	6	Sri Lankan cricket team in Zimbabwe in 1999-2000
5	387	Grant Flower	2	4	New Zealand cricket team in Zimbabwe in 1997–98
Last updated: 30 June 2020

==== Most ducks in career ====
Rank	Ducks	Player	Matches	Innings	Period
1	16	Grant Flower	67	123	1992–2004
2	15	Heath Streak	65	107	1993–2005
3	14	Henry Olonga	30	45	1995–2002
4	10	Alistair Campbell	60	109	1992–2002
4	10	Hamilton Masakadza	38	76	2001–2018
Last updated: 30 June 2020

=== Bowling records ===
==== Most career wickets ====
Rank	Wickets	Player	Matches	Innings	Runs	Period
1	216	Heath Streak	65	102	6,079	1993–2005
2	80	Ray Price	22	35	2,885	1999–2013
3	70	Paul Strang	24	38	2,522	1994–2001
4	68	Henry Olonga	30	47	2,620	1995–2002
5	67	Blessing Muzarabani†	18	27	1,756	2017–2025
6	57	Graeme Cremer	19	27	2,604	2005–2017
7	56	Bryan Strang	26	44	2,203	1995–2001
8	53	Andy Blignaut	19	30	1,964	2001–2005
9	51	Guy Whittall	46	52	2,088	1993–2002
10	46	Kyle Jarvis	13	22	1,354	2011–2020
Last updated: 22 October 2025

==== Fastest wicket taker ====
Wickets	Bowler	Match	Record Date	Reference
50	Heath Streak	11	13 January 1996	
100	Heath Streak	25	27 November 1998	
150	Heath Streak	39	7 June 2001	
200	Heath Streak	58	19 February 2004	
Last updated: 30 June 2020

==== Most wickets against each team ====
Opposition	Wickets	Player	Matches	Innings	Average	Period	Ref
Afghanistan	23	Blessing Muzarabani†	5	9	19.43	2021–2025	
Australia	7	Heath Streak	3	4	50.42	1999–2003	
Bangladesh	24	Kyle Jarvis	5	10	24.29	2011–2018	
England	24	Heath Streak	6	9	24.37	1996–2003	
India	30	Heath Streak	9	13	29.63	1998–2005	
Ireland	13	Blessing Muzarabani†	2	4	17.92	2024–2025	
New Zealand	32	Heath Streak	11	18	33.21	1996–2005	
Pakistan	44	Heath Streak	10	19	22.90	1993–1998	
South Africa	9	Bryan Strang	3	4	34.44	1995–1999	
Sri Lanka	33	Heath Streak	9	14	26.45	1994–2002	
West Indies	24	Ray Price	5	8	28.75	2001–2013	
Last updated: 22 October 2025

==== Best figures in an innings ====
Rank	Figures	Player	Opposition	Venue	Date
1	8/109	Paul Strang	New Zealand	Queens Sports Club, Bulawayo, Zimbabwe	12 September 2000
2	7/58	Blessing Muzarabani†	Ireland	Queens Sports Club, Bulawayo, Zimbabwe	6 February 2025
3	7/113	Sikandar Raza†	Sri Lanka	Harare Sports Club, Harare, Zimbabwe	27 January 2020
4	6/59	Douglas Hondo	Bangladesh	Bangabandhu National Stadium, Dhaka, Bangladesh	14 January 2005
5	6/72	Blessing Muzarabani†	Bangladesh	Sylhet International Cricket Stadium, Sylhet, Bangladesh	20 April 2025
Last updated: 23 April 2025

==== Best bowling figures against each team ====
Opposition	Figures	Player	Venue	Date	Ref
Afghanistan	6/95	Blessing Muzarabani†	Queens Sports Club, Bulawayo, Zimbabwe	5 January 2024	
Australia	6/121	Ray Price	Sydney Cricket Ground, Sydney, Australia	17 October 2003	
Bangladesh	6/59	Douglas Hondo	Bangabandhu National Stadium, Dhaka, Bangladesh	14 January 2005	
England	6/87	Heath Streak	Lord's, London, England	18 May 2000	
India	6/73	Heath Streak	Harare Sports Club, Harare, Zimbabwe	20 September 2005	
Ireland	7/58	Blessing Muzarabani†	Queens Sports Club, Bulawayo, Zimbabwe	6 February 2025	
New Zealand	8/109	Paul Strang	Queens Sports Club, Bulawayo, Zimbabwe	12 September 2000	
Pakistan	6/90	Heath Streak	Harare Sports Club, Harare, Zimbabwe	31 January 1995	
South Africa	5/101	Bryan Strang	Harare Sports Club, Harare, Zimbabwe	13 October 1995	
Sri Lanka	7/113	Sikandar Raza†	Harare Sports Club, Harare, Zimbabwe	27 January 2020	
West Indies	6/73	Ray Price	Harare Sports Club, Harare, Zimbabwe	4 November 2003	
Last updated: 6 February 2025

==== Best figures in a match ====
Rank	Figures	Player	Opposition	Venue	Date
1	11/255	Adam Huckle	New Zealand	Queens Sports Club, Bulawayo, Zimbabwe	25 September 1997
2	10/158	Paul Strang	New Zealand	Queens Sports Club, Bulawayo, Zimbabwe	12 September 2000
3	10/161	Ray Price	West Indies	Harare Sports Club, Harare, Zimbabwe	4 November 2003
4	9/72	Heath Streak	West Indies	Queen's Park Oval, Port of Spain, West Indies	16 March 2000
5	9/105	Heath Streak	Pakistan	Harare Sports Club, Harare, Zimbabwe	31 January 1995
Last updated: 30 June 2020

==== Best career average ====
Rank	Average	Player	Wickets	Runs	Balls	Period
1	26.20	Blessing Muzarabani†	67	1,756	3,161	2017–2025
2	28.14	Heath Streak	216	6,079	13,559	1993–2005
3	29.43	Kyle Jarvis	46	1,354	2,511	2011–2020
4	31.43	Pommie Mbangwa	32	1,006	2,596	1996–2000
5	36.02	Paul Strang	70	2,522	5,720	1994–2001
Qualification: 2,000 balls. Last updated: 22 October 2025

==== Best career economy rate ====
Rank	Economy rate	Player	Wickets	Runs	Balls	Period
1	2.32	Pommie Mbangwa	32	1,006	2,596	1996–2000
2	2.43	Bryan Strang	56	2,203	5,433	1995–2001
3	2.64	Paul Strang	70	2,522	5,720	1994–2001
4	2.67	Guy Whittall	51	2,088	4,686	1946–1959
5	2.69	Heath Streak	216	6,079	13,559	1993–2005
Qualification: 2,000 balls. Last updated: 30 June 2020

==== Best career strike rate ====
Rank	Strike rate	Player	Wickets	Runs	Balls	Period
1	47.2	Blessing Muzarabani†	67	1,756	3,161	2017–2025
2	54.5	Kyle Jarvis	46	1,354	2,511	2011–2020
3	59.8	Andy Blignaut	53	1,964	3,173	2001–2005
4	62.7	Heath Streak	216	6,079	13,559	1993–2005
5	66.2	Henry Olonga	68	2,620	4,502	1995–2002
Qualification: 2,000 balls. Last updated: 22 October 2025

==== Most five-wicket hauls in an innings ====
Rank	Five-wicket hauls	Player	Innings	Balls	Wickets	Period
1	7	Heath Streak	102	13,559	216	1993–2005
2	5	Ray Price	35	6,135	80	1999–2013
3	4	Paul Strang	38	5,720	70	1994–2001
4	3	Kyle Jarvis	22	2,511	46	2011–2020
4	3	Andy Blignaut	30	3,173	53	2001–2005
4	3	Blessing Muzarabani†	27	3,161	67	2017–2025
Last updated: 30 April 2025

==== Most ten-wicket hauls in a match ====
Rank	Ten-wicket hauls	Player	Matches	Balls	Wickets	Period
1	1	Adam Huckle	8	1,568	25	1997–1998
1	1	Paul Strang	24	5,720	70	1994–2001
1	1	Ray Price	22	6,135	80	1999–2013
Last updated: 30 June 2020

==== Worst figures in an innings ====
Rank	Figures	Player	Overs	Opposition	Venue	Date
1	0/192	Ray Price	42	South Africa	Harare Sports Club, Harare, Zimbabwe	7 September 2001
2	0/187	Ray Price	36	Australia	WACA Ground, Perth, Australia	9 October 2003
3	0/149	Natsai Mushangwe	47	Bangladesh	MA Aziz Stadium, Chittagong, Bangladesh	12 November 2014
4	0/142	Paul Strang	43	New Zealand	Eden Park, Auckland, New Zealand	20 January 1996
5	0/137	Brandon Mavuta	31	Bangladesh	Shere Bangla National Stadium, Mirpur, Bangladesh	12 November 2018
Last updated: 30 June 2020

==== Worst figures in a match ====
Rank	Figures	Player	Overs	Opposition	Venue	Date
1	0/211	Ray Price	45.2	South Africa	Harare Sports Club, Harare, Zimbabwe	7 September 2001
2	0/189	Brandon Mavuta	31	Bangladesh	Shere Bangla National Stadium, Mirpur, Bangladesh	12 November 2018
3	0/180	Ray Price	36	Australia	WACA Ground, Perth, Australia	9 October 2003
4	0/149	Natsai Mushangwe	47	Bangladesh	MA Aziz Stadium, Chittagong, Bangladesh	12 November 2014
5	0/142	Paul Strang	43	New Zealand	Eden Park, Auckland, New Zealand	20 January 1996
Last updated:30 June 2020

==== Most wickets in a series ====
Rank	Wickets	Player	Matches	Series
1	22	Heath Streak	3	Pakistani cricket team in Zimbabwe in 1994–95
2	19	Ray Price	2	West Indian cricket team in Zimbabwe in 2003–04
3	16	Adam Huckle	2	New Zealand cricket team in Zimbabwe in 1997–98
4	14	Tinashe Panyangara	3	Zimbabwean cricket team in Bangladesh in 2014–15
5	13	Eddo Brandes	3	Zimbabwean cricket team in Pakistan in 1993–94
5	13	Heath Streak	3	Sri Lankan cricket team in Zimbabwe in 1994-95
Last updated: 30 June 2020

==== Hat-trick ====
No.	Bowler	Against	Inn.	Test	Dismissals	Venue	Date	Ref.
1	Andy Blignaut	Bangladesh	2	1/2	Hannan Sarkar (lbw); Mohammad Ashraful (c sub (Travis Friend)); Mushfiqur Rahman (c Tatenda Taibu)	(Zimbabwe) Harare Sports Club, Harare	22 February 2004	

=== Wicket-keeping records ===
==== Most career dismissals ====
Rank	Dismissals	Player	Matches	Period
1	151	Andy Flower	63	1992–2002
2	60	Tatenda Taibu	28	2001–2012
3	50	Regis Chakabva	22	2011–2021
4	19	Richmond Mutumbami	6	2013–2014
5	16	Wayne James	4	1993–1994
Last updated: 11 July 2021

==== Most career catches ====
Rank	Catches	Player	Matches	Period
1	142	Andy Flower	63	1992–2002
2	55	Tatenda Taibu	28	2001–2012
3	45	Regis Chakabva	22	2011–2021
4	17	Richmond Mutumbami	6	2013–2014
5	16	Wayne James	4	1993–1994
Last updated: 11 July 2021

==== Most career stumpings ====
Rank	Stumpings	Player	Matches	Period
1	9	Andy Flower	63	1992–2002
2	5	Tatenda Taibu	28	2001–2012
2	5	Regis Chakabva	22	2011–2021
4	2	Richmond Mutumbami	6	2013–2014
4	2	Tafadzwa Tsiga†	9	2023–2025
5	1	Peter Moor	8	2016–2018
Last updated: 11 July 2021

==== Most dismissals in an innings ====
Rank	Dismissals	Player	Opposition	Venue	Date
1	5	Wayne James	Sri Lanka	Queens Sports Club, Bulawayo, Zimbabwe	20 October 1994
1	5	Andy Flower	England	Trent Bridge, Nottingham, England	1 June 2000
1	5	Richmond Mutumbami	Bangladesh	Harare Sports Club, Harare, Zimbabwe	25 April 2013
1	5	Regis Chakabva	Bangladesh	Shere Bangla National Stadium, Mirpur, Bangladesh	20 February 2020
Last updated: 30 June 2020

==== Most dismissals in a match ====
Rank	Dismissals	Player	Opposition	Venue	Date
1	7	Wayne James	Sri Lanka	Queens Sports Club, Bulawayo, Zimbabwe	20 October 1994
1	7	Tatenda Taibu	Bangladesh	Harare Sports Club, Harare, Zimbabwe	19 February 2004
1	7	Richmond Mutumbami	Bangladesh	Harare Sports Club, Harare, Zimbabwe	25 April 2013
4	6	Regis Chakabva	Bangladesh	Sylhet International Cricket Stadium, Sylhet, Bangladesh	3 November 2018
5	5	Andy Flower	New Zealand	Harare Sports Club, Harare, Zimbabwe	7 November 1992
5	5	Andy Flower	Pakistan	Harare Sports Club, Harare, Zimbabwe	15 February 1995
5	5	Andy Flower	Sri Lanka	Sinhalese Sports Club Ground, Colombo, Sri Lanka	14 January 1998
5	5	Andy Flower	Sri Lanka	Harare Sports Club, Harare, Zimbabwe	4 December 1999
5	5	Andy Flower	England	Trent Bridge, Nottingham, England	1 June 2000
5	5	Andy Flower	Bangladesh	Harare Sports Club, Harare, Zimbabwe	26 April 2001
5	5	Andy Flower	India	Harare Sports Club, Harare, Zimbabwe	15 June 2001
5	5	Regis Chakabva	Bangladesh	Sher-e-Bangla National Cricket Stadium, Mirpur, Bangladesh	11 November 2018
5	5	Regis Chakabva	Bangladesh	Sher-e-Bangla National Cricket Stadium, Mirpur, Bangladesh	22 February 2020
5	5	Regis Chakabva	Afghanistan	Sheikh Zayed Cricket Stadium, Abu Dhabi, UAE	2 March 2021
5	5	Nyasha Mayavo	Bangladesh	Sylhet International Cricket Stadium, Sylhet, Bangladesh	20 April 2025
Last updated: 23 April 2025

==== Most dismissals in a series ====
Rank	Dismissals	Player	Matches	Innings	Series
1	13	Wayne James	3	5	Sri Lankan cricket team in Zimbabwe in 1994–95
1	13	Andy Flower	3	5	Sri Lankan cricket team in Zimbabwe in 1999–2000
3	11	Regis Chakabva	2	4	Zimbabwean cricket team in Bangladesh in 2018–19
4	10	Andy Flower	3	6	Pakistani cricket team in Zimbabwe in 1994-95
4	10	Richmond Mutumbami	2	4	Bangladeshi cricket team in Zimbabwe in 2013
Last updated: 30 June 2020

=== Fielding records ===
==== Most career catches ====
Rank	Catches	Player	Matches	Period
1	60	Alistair Campbell	60	1992–2002
2	43	Grant Flower	67	1992–2004
3	34	Stuart Carlisle	37	1995–2005
4	29	Hamilton Masakadza	38	2001–2018
5	27	Brendan Taylor†	36	2004–2025
5	27	Craig Ervine	31	2011–2025
Last updated: 22 October 2025

==== Most catches in a series ====
Rank	Catches	Player	Matches	Innings	Series
1	7	Mark Dekker	3	5	Sri Lankan cricket team in Zimbabwe in 1994-95
1	7	Alistair Campbell	2	4	English cricket team in Zimbabwe in 1996-97
3	6	Hamilton Masakadza	3	6	Zimbabwean cricket team in Bangladesh in 2014-15
4	5	Andy Flower	3	5	Sri Lankan cricket team in Zimbabwe in 1994-95
4	5	Stuart Carlisle	3	6	Pakistani cricket team in Zimbabwe in 1994-95
4	5	Grant Flower	3	6	Pakistani cricket team in Zimbabwe in 1994-95
4	5	Alistair Campbell	2	4	Bangladeshi cricket team in Zimbabwe in 2000-01
4	5	Alistair Campbell	2	4	Pakistani cricket team in Zimbabwe in 2002-03
4	5	Hamilton Masakadza	2	4	Zimbabwean cricket team in Bangladesh in 2004-05
4	5	Craig Ervine†	3	6	Zimbabwean cricket team in Bangladesh in 2014-15
4	5	Craig Ervine†	2	3	West Indian cricket team in Zimbabwe in 2017-18
Last updated: 30 June 2020

=== All-round Records ===
==== 1000 runs and 100 wickets ====
A total of 71 players have achieved the double of 1000 runs and 100 wickets in their Test career.

Rank	Player	Average Difference	Period	Matches	Runs	Bat Avg	Wickets	Bowl Avg
1	Heath Streak	-5.78	1993-2005	65	1990	22.35	216	28.14
Last updated: 22 August 2020

=== Other records ===
==== Most career matches ====
Rank	Matches	Player	Period
1	67	Grant Flower	1992–2002
2	65	Heath Streak	1993–2005
3	63	Andy Flower	1992-2002
4	60	Alistair Campbell	1992-2002
5	46	Guy Whittall	1993–2002
Last updated: 30 June 2020

==== Most consecutive career matches ====
Rank	Matches	Player	Period
1	56	Alistair Campbell	1992–2001
2	52	Andy Flower	1992–2001
Last updated: 3 June 2018

==== Most matches as captain ====
Rank	Matches	Player	Period
1	21	Alistair Campbell	1996–2002
1	21	Heath Streak	2000–2004
3	20	Andy Flower	1993–2000
4	16	Brendan Taylor	2011–2021
5	14	Craig Ervine†	2020–2025
Last updated: 20 October 2025

==== Youngest players on Debut ====
Rank	Age	Player	Opposition	Venue	Date
1	17 years and 352 days	Hamilton Masakadza	West Indies	Harare Sports Club, Harare, Zimbabwe	27 July 2001
2	18 years and 53 days	Elton Chigumbura	Sri Lanka	Harare Sports Club, Harare, Zimbabwe	6 May 2004
3	18 years and 66 days	Tatenda Taibu	West Indies	Queens Sports Club, Bulawayo, Zimbabwe	19 July 2001
4	18 years and 90 days	Brendon Taylor	Sri Lanka	Harare Sports Club, Harare, Zimbabwe	6 May 2004
5	18 years and 109 days	Graeme Cremer	Bangladesh	MA Aziz Stadium, Chittagong, Bangladesh	6 January 2005
Last updated: 3 December 2017

==== Oldest players on Debut ====
Rank	Age	Player	Opposition	Venue	Date
1	37 years and 84 days	Andy Waller	England	Queens Sports Club, Bulawayo, Zimbabwe	18 December 1996
2	36 years and 317 days	Malcolm Jarvis	India	Harare Sports Club, Harare, Zimbabwe	18 October 1992
3	36 years and 134 days	Andy Pycroft	India	Harare Sports Club, Harare, Zimbabwe	18 October 1992
4	35 years and 117 days	David Houghton	India	Harare Sports Club, Harare, Zimbabwe	18 October 1992
5	34 years and 282 days	Iain Butchart	Pakistan	Harare Sports Club, Harare, Zimbabwe	15 February 1995
Last updated: 30 June 2020

==== Oldest players ====
Rank	Age	Player	Opposition	Venue	Date
1	45 years and 300 days	John Traicos	India	Arun Jaitley Stadium, Delhi, India	13 March 1993
2	40 years and 94 days	David Houghton	New Zealand	Queens Sports Club, Bulawayo, Zimbabwe	25 September 1997
3	39 years and 244 days	Craig Ervine †	Bangladesh	Sylhet International Cricket Stadium, Sylhet, Bangladesh	20 April 2025
4	38 years and 324 days	Malcolm Jarvis	Sri Lanka	Harare Sports Club, Harare, Zimbabwe	26 October 1994
5	38 years and 253 days	Sikandar Raza †	Afghanistan	queens Sports Club, Bulawayo, Zimbabwe	2 January 2025
Last updated: 28 January 2021

== Partnership records ==
In cricket, two batsmen are always present at the crease batting together in a partnership. This partnership will continue until one of them is dismissed, retires or the innings comes to a close.

=== Highest partnerships by wicket ===
A wicket partnership describes the number of runs scored before each wicket falls. The first wicket partnership is between the opening batsmen and continues until the first wicket falls. The second wicket partnership then commences between the not out batsman and the number three batsman. This partnership continues until the second wicket falls. The third wicket partnership then commences between the not out batsman and the new batsman. This continues down to the tenth wicket partnership. When the tenth wicket has fallen, there is no batsman left to partner so the innings is closed.

Wicket	Runs	First batsman	Second batsman	Opposition	Venue	Date
1st wicket	164	Dion Ebrahim	Alistair Campbell	West Indies	Queens Sports Club, Bulawayo, Zimbabwe	19 July 2001
2nd wicket	160	Sikandar Raza†	Hamilton Masakadza	Bangladesh	Zohur Ahmed Chowdhury Stadium, Chittagong, Bangladesh	12 November 2014
3rd wicket	194	Alistair Campbell	Dave Houghton	Sri Lanka	Harare Sports Club, Harare, Zimbabwe	26 October 1994
4th wicket	269	Grant Flower	Andy Flower	Pakistan	Harare Sports Club, Harare, Zimbabwe	31 January 1995
5th wicket	277*	Murray Goodwin	Andy Flower	Pakistan	Queens Sports Club, Bulawayo, Zimbabwe	14 March 1998
6th wicket	165	Dave Houghton	Andy Flower	India	Harare Sports Club, Harare, Zimbabwe	18 October 1992
7th wicket	154	Heath Streak	Andy Blignaut	West Indies	Harare Sports Club, Harare, Zimbabwe	27 July 2001
8th wicket	187	Donald Tiripano	Sean Williams	Afghanistan	Sheikh Zayed Cricket Stadium, Abu Dhabi UAE	10 March 2021
9th wicket	87	Paul Strang	Bryan Strang	Pakistan	Sheikhupura Stadium, Sheikhupura, Pakistan	17 October 1996
10th wicket	97*	Andy Flower	Henry Olonga	India	Arun Jaitley Stadium, Delhi, India	18 November 2000
Last updated: 14 March 2021

=== Highest partnerships by runs ===
Wicket	Runs	First batsman	Second batsman	Opposition	Venue	Date
5th wicket	277*	Murray Goodwin	Andy Flower	Pakistan	Queens Sports Club, Bulawayo, Zimbabwe	14 March 1998
4th wicket	269	Grant Flower	Andy Flower	Pakistan	Harare Sports Club, Harare, Zimbabwe	31 January 1995
5th wicket	233*	Grant Flower	Guy Whittall	Pakistan	Harare Sports Club, Harare, Zimbabwe	31 January 1995
4th wicket	209	Alistair Campbell	Andy Flower	India	Vidarbha Cricket Association Ground, Nagpur, India	25 November 2000
3rd wicket	194	Alistair Campbell	Dave Houghton	Sri Lanka	Harare Sports Club, Harare, Zimbabwe	26 October 1994
Last updated: 30 June 2020

== Umpiring records ==
=== Most matches umpired ===
Rank	Matches	Umpire	Period
1	44	Russell Tiffin	1995–2009
2	28	Ian Robinson	1992–2001
3	4	Kantilal Kanjee	1992–1994
3	4	Kevan Barbour	1999–2001
5	3	Langton Rusere	2021–2021
Last updated: 11 July 2021
