= Indian cricket team in Zimbabwe in 1998–99 =

	India	Zimbabwe
- Dates: 26 September – 10 October 1998
Captains	Mohammad Azharuddin	Alistair Campbell

Test series
- Result: Zimbabwe won the 1-match series 1–0
Most runs	Rahul Dravid (162)	Gavin Rennie (131)
Most wickets	Anil Kumble (7)	Henry Olonga (6)

One Day International series
- Results: India won the 3-match series 2–1
Most runs	Sourav Ganguly (158); Sachin Tendulkar (158)	Alistair Campbell (131)
Most wickets	Ajit Agarkar (6)	Heath Streak (4)
- Player of the series: Sachin Tendulkar (Ind)

The Indian cricket team toured Zimbabwe from 26 September to 10 October 1998 in a tour consisting of three One Day Internationals (ODI) and a one-off Test match. The ODI series was named Hero Honda series for sponsorship reasons.

This was India's third tour of Zimbabwe, after the tours of 1992–93 and 1996–97. It began with ODI games on 26 and 27 September, both of which was won by India by a margin of eight wickets. Zimbabwe won the final game by a 37-run margin played three days later, a win that their coach David Houghton attributed to Eddo Brandes. Henry Olonga who returned to Zimbabwe's Test side after two years played a significant role his team's 61-run win that followed the ODI series, and was named player of the match. Meanwhile, India's poor record in Tests away from home continued, having won only one away Test since 1986. The tour also included a three-day first-class game between the India and Zimbabwe Cricket Union President's XI.

== Squads ==
Zimbabwe	India
Alistair Campbell (c); Andy Flower (vc) (wk); Murray Goodwin; Craig Evans; Gary Brent; Paul Strang; Andy Whittall; Mluleki Nkala; John Rennie; Craig Wishart; Heath Streak; Adam Huckle; Trevor Madondo; Pommie Mbangwa; Eddo Brandes; Henry Olonga; Neil Johnson	Mohammad Azharuddin (c); Ajay Jadeja (vc); Sachin Tendulkar; Sourav Ganguly; Robin Singh; Rahul Dravid; Navjot Singh Sidhu; Javagal Srinath; Ajit Agarkar; Nayan Mongia (wk); Anil Kumble; Harbhajan Singh; Debashish Mohanty; Rahul Sanghvi

In the Zimbabwe side that was picked for the ODI series and the one-off Test, Grant Flower was a notable exclusion. He was dropped after he sustained a finger injury in a club game on 20 September. Other team regulars who missed out included Guy Whittall, who was rested after he underwent a knee surgery, and Everton Matambanadzo, who had an injured shoulder. John Rennie and Gary Brent were added back to the squad, alongside Zimbabwe under-19 player Mluleki Nkala. India's touring party included coach Anshuman Gaekwad and administrative manager C. T. Palanka.

Eddo Brandes returned to the side after recovering from an injury for the third ODI. Henry Olonga who was not included in the initial squad, was included in the one-off Test, making his comeback in the Test side after two years, alongside Neil Johnson.

== Tour match ==
=== Three-day: Zimbabwe Cricket Union President's XI v Indians ===
2–4 October 1998
Scorecard

Zimbabwe Cricket Union President's XI	v	Indians
156 (73.4 overs); Mark Vermeulen 46 (108); Anil Kumble 5/35 (24.4 overs)		400/5d (97.4 overs); Anil Kumble 100* (131); Bryan Strang 2/105 (24 overs)
173 (54.4 overs); Bryan Strang 48 (49); Anil Kumble 5/18 (13.5 overs)

Indians won by an innings and 71 runs
Sunrise Sports Club, Harare
Umpires: Charles Coventry and Ahmed Esat

- Zimbabwe Cricket Union President's XI won the toss and elected to bat.
- Dougie Marillier and Gus Mackay (Zimbabwe Cricket Union President's XI) made their first-class debut.
- Rahul Sanghvi (Indians) completed 200 wickets in first-class cricket.

== One-day Series ==
=== First ODI ===
26 September
Scorecard

Zimbabwe; 213 (50 overs)	v	India; 216/2 (42.2 overs)
Alistair Campbell 53 (41); Harbhajan Singh 3/36 (10 overs)		Sachin Tendulkar 127* (130); Heath Streak 1/30 (8 overs)

India won by 8 wickets
Queens Sports Club, Bulawayo
Umpires: Ian Robinson (Zim) and Russell Tiffin (Zim)
Player of the match: Sachin Tendulkar (Ind)

- India won the toss and elected to field.
- Trevor Madondo (Zim) made his ODI debut.
- Anil Kumble (Ind) completed 200 wickets in ODIs.

=== Second ODI ===
27 September
Scorecard

Zimbabwe; 235/7 (45 overs)	v	India; 236/2 (41.5 overs)
Alistair Campbell 74 (82); Anil Kumble 2/49 (9 overs)		Sourav Ganguly 107* (129); Alistair Campbell 1/28 (5 overs)

India won by 8 wickets
Queens Sports Club, Bulawayo
Umpires: Graeme Evans (Zim) and Ian Robinson (Zim)
Player of the match: Sourav Ganguly (Ind)

- India won the toss and elected to field.
- Overnight rain led to delayed start of play reducing the match to 45 overs per side.
- Mluleki Nkala (Zim) made his ODI debut.
- Alistair Campbell (Zim) passed 2,000 runs in ODIs.

=== Third ODI ===
30 September
Scorecard

Zimbabwe; 259/5 (50 overs)	v	India; 222 (47.2 overs)
Craig Wishart 102 (124); Ajit Agarkar 2/45 (10 overs)		Robin Singh 56 (65); Heath Streak 3/33 (9 overs)

Zimbabwe won by 37 runs
Harare Sports Club, Harare
Umpires: Kevan Barbour and Russell Tiffin (Zim)
Player of the match: Craig Wishart (Zim)

- India won the toss and elected to field.
- Sachin Tendulkar (Ind) played his 200th ODI.

== Test Series ==
=== Only Test ===
7–10 October (Note: While five days of play were scheduled for the Test, a result within four days.)
Scorecard

Zimbabwe	v	India
221 (80.4 Overs); Gavin Rennie 47 (123); Anil Kumble 3/42 (17.4 Overs)		280 (107.2 Overs); Rahul Dravid 118 (300); Henry Olonga 5/70 (26 Overs)
293 (105 Overs); Gavin Rennie 84 (232); Anil Kumble 4/87 (36 Overs)		173 (56.4 Overs); Rahul Dravid 44 (115); Neil Johnson 3/41 (14.4 Overs)

Zimbabwe won by 61 runs
Harare Sports Club, Harare
Umpires: Rudi Koertzen (SA) and Ian Robinson (Zim)
Player of the match: Henry Olonga (Zim)

- India won the toss and elected to field.
- Ajit Agarkar, Robin Singh (Ind), and Neil Johnson (Zim) made their Test debuts.
- Anil Kumble (Ind) completed 200 wickets in Tests.
- Andy Flower (Zim) became the first Zimbabwe player to complete 2,000 runs in Tests.
