= List of international cricket five-wicket hauls by Wasim Akram =

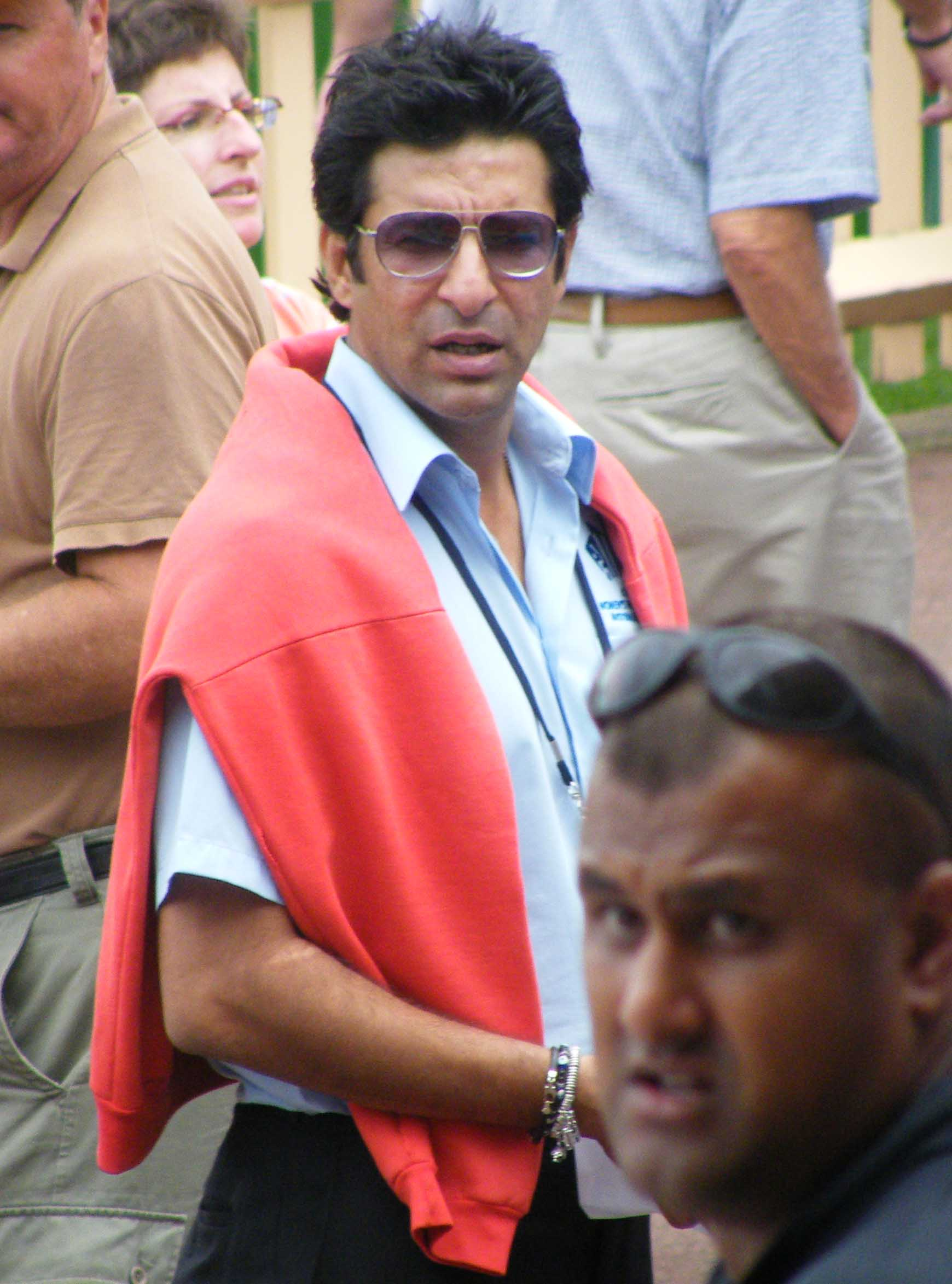

Wasim Akram, a former Pakistani cricketer, took 31 five-wicket hauls during his career in international cricket. In cricket, a five-wicket haul (also known as a "five–for" or "fifer") refers to a bowler taking five or more wickets in a single innings. This is regarded as a notable achievement, and as of October 2024, only 54 bowlers have taken 15 or more five-wicket hauls at international level in their cricketing careers. A left-arm fast bowler who represented his country between 1984 and 2003, the BBC described Akram as "one of the greatest left-arm bowlers in the history of world cricket", while West Indian batsman Brian Lara said that Akram was "definitely the most outstanding bowler [I] ever faced".

Akram made his Test debut in January 1985, in an innings defeat by New Zealand in Auckland. The following Test, in a man-of-the-match performance, he took ten wickets over the two innings, securing his first two five-wicket hauls but still ended on the losing side. He took another pair of five-wicket hauls in a single match five years later, against Australia at the Melbourne Cricket Ground (MCG). His career-best figures for an innings were 7 wickets for 119 runs against New Zealand in Wellington, in February 1994.

Making his One Day International (ODI) debut in 1984 against New Zealand in Faisalabad, Akram's first ODI five-wicket haul came the following year against Australia in a match which Pakistan won at the MCG. In 1989, he took five wickets in an innings, in a performance that included a hat-trick (three wickets in consecutive deliveries), against the West Indies. His career-best bowling in ODI cricket was 5 wickets for 15 runs against Zimbabwe in Karachi, in December 1993.

Retiring from international cricket in 2003 after nearly 20 years, Akram took 25 five-wicket hauls in Test cricket and 6 in ODIs. As of 2014, his position in the all-time lists for taking five wickets in an innings the most times is seventh overall in both Tests and ODIs.

== Key ==
Symbol	Meaning
Date	Day the Test started or ODI held
Inn	Innings in which five-wicket haul was taken
Overs	Number of overs bowled
Runs	Number of runs conceded
Wkts	Number of wickets taken
Econ	Runs conceded per over
Batsmen	Batsmen whose wickets were taken
Result	Result for the Pakistan team
*	One of two five-wicket hauls by Akram in a match
†	10 or more wickets taken in the match
‡	Akram was selected as man of the match

== Tests ==
No.	Date	Ground	Against	Inn	Overs	Runs	Wkts	Econ	Batsmen	Result
1	9 February 1985 * † ‡	Carisbrook, Dunedin	New Zealand	2	26.0	56	5	2.15	Geoff Howarth; John Fulton Reid; Martin Crowe; Jeff Crowe; Lance Cairns	Lost
2	9 February 1985 * † ‡	Carisbrook, Dunedin	New Zealand	4	33.0	72	5	2.18	Geoff Howarth; John Fulton Reid; Jeff Crowe; Ian Smith; Brendon Bracewell	Lost
3	24 October 1986 ‡	Iqbal Stadium, Faisalabad	West Indies	2	25.0	91	6	3.64	Gordon Greenidge; Roger Harper; Malcolm Marshall; Viv Richards; Courtney Walsh; Patrick Patterson	Won
4	11 February 1987	Eden Gardens, Calcutta	India	1	31.0	96	5	3.09	Kris Srikkanth; Dilip Vengsarkar; Mohammed Azharuddin; Raju Kulkarni; Maninder Singh	Drawn
5	9 December 1989	Jinnah Stadium, Sialkot	India	1	28.2	101	5	3.56	Kris Srikkanth; Navjot Sidhu; Sachin Tendulkar; Kapil Dev; Maninder Singh	Drawn
6	12 January 1990 * † ‡	Melbourne Cricket Ground	Australia	1	30.0	62	6	2.06	Geoff Marsh; David Boon; Allan Border; Peter Sleep; Merv Hughes; Terry Alderman	Lost
7	12 January 1990 * † ‡	Melbourne Cricket Ground	Australia	3	41.4	98	5	2.35	Dean Jones; Steve Waugh; Peter Sleep; Ian Healy; Merv Hughes	Lost
8	19 January 1990	Adelaide Oval	Australia	2	43.0	100	5	2.32	Geoff Marsh; David Boon; Steve Waugh; Greg Campbell; Carl Rackemann	Drawn
9	6 December 1990	Gaddafi Stadium, Lahore	West Indies	3	9.0	28	5	3.11	Gus Logie; Jeff Dujon; Malcolm Marshall; Curtly Ambrose; Courtney Walsh	Drawn
10	2 July 1992	Old Trafford, Manchester	England	2	36.0	128	5	3.55	Alec Stewart; Michael Atherton; David Gower; Chris Lewis; Ian Salisbury	Drawn
11	6 August 1992 ‡	Kennington Oval, London	England	1	22.1	67	6	3.02	Alec Stewart; Mark Ramprakash; Chris Lewis; Derek Pringle; Neil Mallender; Devon Malcolm	Won
12	2 January 1993 ‡	Trust Bank Park, Hamilton	New Zealand	2	22.0	45	5	2.04	Blair Hartland; Mark Greatbatch; Danny Morrison; Adam Parore; Ken Rutherford	Won
13	9 December 1993	Rawalpindi Cricket Stadium, Rawalpindi	Zimbabwe	4	23.2	65	5	2.78	Grant Flower; Guy Whittall; Glen Bruk-Jackson; Eddo Brandes; Stephen Peall	Won
14	10 February 1994 ‡	Eden Park, Auckland	New Zealand	3	16.1	43	6	2.65	Bryan Young; Blair Pocock; Andrew Jones; Mark Greatbatch; Simon Doull; Michael Owens	Won
15	17 February 1994 † ‡	Basin Reserve, Wellington	New Zealand	2	37.0	119	7	3.21	Bryan Young; Andrew Jones; Mark Greatbatch; Shane Thomson; Tony Blain; Matthew Hart; Simon Doull	Won
16	9 August 1994	Paikiasothy Saravanamuttu Stadium, Colombo	Sri Lanka	4	18.0	43	5	2.38	Sanath Jayasuriya; Pubudu Dassanayake; Kumar Dharmasena; Pramodya Wickramasinghe; Jayananda Warnaweera	Won
17	28 September 1994	National Stadium, Karachi	Australia	3	22.0	63	5	2.86	Michael Bevan; Steve Waugh; Ian Healy; Jo Angel; Tim May	Won
18	7 February 1995 ‡	Queens Sports Club, Bulawayo	Zimbabwe	3	22.3	43	5	1.91	Mark Dekker; Alistair Campbell; David Houghton; Andy Flower; Bryan Strang	Won
19	8 September 1995 ‡	Arbab Niaz Stadium, Peshawar	Sri Lanka	2	20.0	55	5	2.75	Sanjeeva Ranatunga; Chamara Dunusinghe; Chaminda Vaas; Pramodya Wickramasinghe; Muttiah Muralitharan	Won
20	8 December 1995	Lancaster Park, Christchurch	New Zealand	2	24.5	53	5	2.13	Roger Twose; Chris Cairns; Lee Germon; Dipak Patel; Dion Nash	Won
21	24 October 1996 † ‡	Iqbal Stadium, Faisalabad	Zimbabwe	1	20.0	48	6	2.40	Grant Flower; Mark Dekker; David Houghton; Guy Whittall; Bryan Strang; Pommie Mbangwa	Won
22	27 November 1998	Arbab Niaz Stadium, Peshawar	Zimbabwe	2	23.0	52	5	2.26	Gavin Rennie; Alistair Campbell; Neil Johnson; Craig Wishart; Henry Olonga	Lost
23	25 May 2000 * † ‡	Antigua Recreation Ground, St John's, Antigua	West Indies	2	26.2	61	6	2.31	Shivnarine Chanderpaul; Ramnaresh Sarwan; Ridley Jacobs; Franklyn Rose; Curtly Ambrose; Reon King	Won
24	25 May 2000 * † ‡	Antigua Recreation Ground, St John's, Antigua	West Indies	4	30.0	49	5	1.63	Sherwin Campbell; Adrian Griffith; Wavell Hinds; Ramnaresh Sarwan; Reon King	Won
25	14 June 2000 ‡	Sinhalese Sports Club Ground, Colombo	Sri Lanka	3	15.3	45	5	2.90	Russel Arnold; Arjuna Ranatunga; Chaminda Vaas; Nuwan Zoysa; Dilhara Fernando	Won

== One Day Internationals ==
No.	Date	Ground	Against	Inn	Overs	Runs	Wkts	Econ	Batsmen	Result
1	24 February 1985 †	Melbourne Cricket Ground	Australia	2	8	21	5	2.62	Kepler Wessels; Robbie Kerr; Dean Jones; Allan Border; Kim Hughes	Won
2	14 October 1989 †	Sharjah Cricket Association Stadium	West Indies	2	9.4	38	5	3.93	Phil Simmons; Jeff Dujon; Malcolm Marshall; Curtly Ambrose; Courtney Walsh	Won
3	26 December 1992 †	Basin Reserve, Wellington	New Zealand	2	9	19	5	2.11	Mark Greatbatch; Rod Latham; Andrew Jones; Adam Parore; Gavin Larsen	Won
4	15 February 1993	Buffalo Park, East London	South Africa	2	6.1	16	5	2.59	Andrew Hudson; Jonty Rhodes; Errol Stewart; Brian McMillan; Allan Donald	Won
5	24 December 1993 †	National Stadium, Karachi	Zimbabwe	1	7	15	5	2.14	Andy Flower; Alistair Campbell; Eddo Brandes; Stephen Peall; Heath Streak	Won
6	16 February 2003 †	De Beers Diamond Oval, Kimberley	Namibia	2	9	28	5	3.11	Gavin Murgatroyd; Louis Burger; Deon Kotzé; Gerrie Snyman; Melt van Schoor	Won
