= Sri Lankan cricket team in Zimbabwe in 1994–95 =

International cricket tour

	Zimbabwe	Sri Lanka
- Dates: 11 October 1994 – 6 November 1994
Captains	Andy Flower	Arjuna Ranatunga

Test series
- Result: 3-match series drawn 0–0
Most runs	Dave Houghton (466)	Sanjeeva Ranatunga (273)
Most wickets	Heath Streak (13)	Chaminda Vaas (10)

One Day International series
- Results: Sri Lanka won the 3-match series 2–1
Most runs	Andy Flower (145)	Roshan Mahanama (267)
Most wickets	Guy Whittall (6)	Chaminda Vaas (9)

The Sri Lanka cricket team toured Zimbabwe for a three-match Test series and a three-match One Day International (ODI) series between 11 October 1994 and 6 November 1994. The Test series, which was the first played between the two teams, was drawn 0–0 and the ODI series was won 2–1 by Sri Lanka.

== Test series ==
=== 1st Test ===
11–13, 15–16 October 1994
Scorecard

Sri Lanka	v	Zimbabwe
383 (179.5 overs); Asanka Gurusinha 128 (461); Guy Whittall 4/70 (33 overs)		319/8 (123 overs); Dave Houghton 58 (181); Chaminda Vaas 4/74 (37 overs)

Match drawn
Harare Sports Club, Harare
Umpires: Lloyd Barker (Win) and Ian Robinson (Zim)

- Sri Lanka won the toss and elected to bat.
- Days three and four were interrupted by rain, day five was a washout.

=== 2nd Test ===
20–24 October 1994
Scorecard

Zimbabwe	v	Sri Lanka
462/9 dec (188.3 overs); Dave Houghton 266 (541); Chaminda Vaas 4/85 (44.3 overs)		218 (126.1 overs); Asanka Gurusinha 63 (263); Malcolm Jarvis 3/30 (34 overs)
		193/4 (f/o) (115 overs); Sanjeeva Ranatunga 100* (352); Malcolm Jarvis 1/24 (24 overs)

Match drawn
Queens Sports Club, Bulawayo
Umpires: Brian Aldridge (NZ) and Ian Robinson (Zim)

- Zimbabwe won the toss and elected to bat.

=== 3rd Test ===
26–28, 30–31 October 1994
Scorecard

Sri Lanka	v	Zimbabwe
402 (162 overs); Hashan Tillakaratne 116 (287); Heath Streak 4/97 (38 overs)		375 (150.4 overs); Dave Houghton 142 (268); Ravindra Pushpakumara 7/116 (35.4 overs)
89/3 (24 overs); Aravinda de Silva 41* (32); David Brain 2/48 (11 overs)

Match drawn
Harare Sports Club, Harare
Umpires: Kantilal Kanjee (Zim) and Mahboob Shah (Pak)

- Sri Lanka won the toss and elected to bat.
- Paul Strang (Zim) made his Test debut.

== ODI series ==
=== 1st ODI ===
3 November 1994
Scorecard

Sri Lanka; 256/5 (50 overs)	v	Zimbabwe; 200 (48.1 overs)
Roshan Mahanama 119* (142); Guy Whittall 3/58 (10 overs)		Andy Flower 61 (81); Chaminda Vaas 4/20 (9.1 overs)

Sri Lanka won by 56 runs
Harare Sports Club, Harare
Umpires: Quintin Goosen (Zim) and Ian Robinson (Zim)
Player of the match: Roshan Mahanama (Sri)

- Zimbabwe won the toss and elected to field.
- Gary Martin (Zim) made his ODI debut.

=== 2nd ODI ===
5 November 1994
Scorecard

Zimbabwe; 290/5 (50 overs)	v	Sri Lanka; 288/8 (50 overs)
Alistair Campbell 131* (115); Chaminda Vaas 3/59 (10 overs)		Roshan Mahanama 108 (149); Heath Streak 4/44 (10 overs)

Zimbabwe won by 2 runs
Harare Sports Club, Harare
Umpires: Quintin Goosen (Zim) and Ian Robinson (Zim)
Player of the match: Alistair Campbell (Zim)

- Zimbabwe won the toss and elected to bat.

=== 3rd ODI ===
6 November 1994
Scorecard

Sri Lanka; 296/4 (50 overs)	v	Zimbabwe; 105 (48.1 overs)
Aravinda de Silva 107* (100); David Brain 3/67 (10 overs)		Wayne James 29 (62); Ravindra Pushpakumara 3/25 (9 overs)

Sri Lanka won by 191 runs
Harare Sports Club, Harare
Umpires: Nigel Fleming (Zim) and Kantilal Kanjee (Zim)
Player of the match: Aravinda de Silva (Sri)

- Sri Lanka won the toss and elected to bat.
