= David Brain (disambiguation) =

David Brain may refer to:

- David Brain (born 1964), Zimbabwean cricketer
- Dave Brain (1879–1959), English baseball player

== See also ==
- David Braine (disambiguation)
