= Madondo =

Madondo is a South African surname. Notable people with the surname include:

- Kulegani Madondo (born 1990), South African football midfielder
- Tafadzwa Madondo (1981–2008), Zimbabwean cricketer
- Trevor Madondo (1976–2001), Zimbabwean cricketer
- Abraham Madondo (born 1964), Famous Zimbabwean Soccer Player
