= Pakistani cricket team in Zimbabwe in 1994–95 =

	Zimbabwe	Pakistan
- Dates: 31 January 1995 – 26 February 1995
Captains	Andy Flower	Saleem Malik

Test series
- Result: Pakistan won the 3-match series 2–1
Most runs	Andy Flower (250)	Inzamam-ul-Haq (367)
Most wickets	Heath Streak (22)	Wasim Akram (13)
- Player of the series: Inzamam-ul-Haq (Pak), Heath Streak (Zim)

One Day International series
- Results: 3-match series drawn 1–1
Most runs	Dave Houghton (139)	Inzamam-ul-Haq (161)
Most wickets	Bryan Strang (7)	Wasim Akram (6)

The Pakistan cricket team toured Zimbabwe for a three-match Test series and a three-match One Day International (ODI) series between 31 January and 30 February 1995. The Test series was won 2–1 by Pakistan and the ODI series was drawn 1–1. Zimbabwe's win in the first match of the Test series was their first since becoming a Test nation.

== Test series ==
=== 1st Test ===
31 January – 2 February,
4 February 1995
Scorecard

Zimbabwe	v	Pakistan
544/4 dec (165 overs); Grant Flower 201* (523); Aaqib Javed 2/73 (34.1 overs)		322 (124 overs); Inzamam-ul-Haq 71 (197); Heath Streak 6/90 (39 overs)
		158 (f/o) (62 overs); Inzamam-ul-Haq 65 (98); Heath Streak 3/15 (11 overs)

Zimbabwe won by an innings and 64 runs
Harare Sports Club, Harare
Umpires: Mervyn Kitchen (Eng) and Ian Robinson (Zim)
Player of the match: Andy Flower (Zim), Grant Flower (Zim)

- Zimbabwe won the toss and elected to bat.

=== 2nd Test ===
7–9 February 1995
Scorecard

Zimbabwe	v	Pakistan
174 (79.1 overs); Alistair Campbell 60 (163); Wasim Akram 3/40 (22 overs)		260 (94 overs); Ijaz Ahmed 76 (173); Heath Streak 5/70 (26 overs)
146 (58.3 overs); Stuart Carlisle 46* (74); Wasim Akram 5/43 (22.3 overs)		61/2 (11.4 overs); Aamer Sohail 46 (27); Bryan Strang 2/6 (3.4 overs)

Pakistan won by 8 wickets
Queens Sports Club, Bulawayo
Umpires: B. C. Cooray (Sri), Quintin Goosen (Zim)
Player of the match: Wasim Akram (Pak)

- Zimbabwe won the toss and elected to bat.

=== 3rd Test ===
15–16 February,
18–19 February 1995
Scorecard

Pakistan	v	Zimbabwe
231 (83.3 overs); Inzamam-ul-Haq 101 (168); Heath Streak 4/53 (18 overs)		243 (78 overs); Andy Flower 37 (60); Aaqib Javed 4/64 (25 overs)
250 (95.1 overs); Inzamam-ul-Haq 83 (180); Heath Streak 4/52 (18 overs)		139 (59.4 overs); Andy Flower 35 (80); Aamer Nazir 5/46 (19 overs)

Pakistan won by 99 runs
Harare Sports Club, Harare
Umpires: Steve Randell (Aus) and Ian Robinson (Zim)
Player of the match: Inzamam-ul-Haq (Pak)

- Pakistan won the toss and elected to bat.

== ODI series ==
=== 1st ODI ===
22 February 1995
Scorecard

Zimbabwe; 219/9 (50 overs)	v	Pakistan; 219 (49.5 overs)
Grant Flower 41 (83); Aamer Sohail 3/33 (10 overs)		Saeed Anwar 103* (131); Bryan Strang 4/36 (10 overs)

Match tied
Harare Sports Club, Harare
Umpires: Ahmed Esat (Zim) and Ian Robinson (Zim)
Player of the match: Saeed Anwar (Pak), Bryan Strang (Zim)

- Zimbabwe won the toss and elected to bat.

=== 2nd ODI ===
25 February 1995
Scorecard

Zimbabwe; 209/5 (50 overs)	v	Pakistan; 210/6 (48.3 overs)
Dave Houghton 73* (77); Manzoor Elahi 2/36 (10 overs)		Inzamam-ul-Haq 116* (138); Bryan Strang 3/22 (10 overs)

Pakistan won by 4 wickets
Harare Sports Club, Harare
Umpires: Ahmed Esat (Zim) and Quintin Goosen (Zim)
Player of the match: Inzamam-ul-Haq (Pak)

- Pakistan won the toss and elected to field.

=== 3rd ODI ===
26 February 1995
Scorecard

Zimbabwe; 222/9 (50 overs)	v	Pakistan; 148 (43.3 overs)
Andy Flower 73 (104); Aaqib Javed 3/46 (10 overs)		Inzamam-ul-Haq 45 (54); Paul Strang 3/42 (10 overs)

Zimbabwe won by 74 runs
Harare Sports Club, Harare
Umpires: Quintin Goosen (Zim) and Ian Robinson (Zim)
Player of the match: Andy Flower (Zim)

- Pakistan won the toss and elected to field.
