= Lilfordia School =

- Lilfordia School Badge

Location
- Mashonaland West; Zimbabwe
- Coordinates: 17°43′49.713″S 30°46′10.2036″E

Information
- Type: Independent, preparatory, boarding school
- Motto: Be Alert
- Denomination: Interdenominational
- Established: 1909
- Founders: Agnes Lilford; Atherton Lilford
- Headmaster: Donald Campbell
- Grades: 1 to 7
- Gender: Co-educational
- Enrollment: 181 (2015)
- Campus type: Rural
- Tuition: US$3,200.00 (Note: Termly fees, the year has 3 terms.)
- Affiliations: ATS; CHISZ
- Website: www.lilfordia.com

Lilfordia School (or Lilfordia) is an independent, preparatory, boarding school for boys and girls in Mashonaland West, Zimbabwe. Lilfordia was established in 1909 by Agnes and Atherton Lilford. The school is notable for the producing talented cricketers such as Brendan Taylor and Trevor Madondo.

Lilfordia School is a member of the Association of Trust Schools and the Headmaster is a member of the Conference of Heads of Independent Schools in Zimbabwe.

== History ==
In 1909, Agnes and Atherton Lilford opened Lilfordia School and a lodging establishment for people living in Salisbury (now Harare) on their farm in order to supplement their income as the Lilfords were struggling financially. As the school grew the lodge was closed. Lilfordia became "government approved" in the 1920s.

== Sports ==
Sports offered at Lilfordia include:

- Athletics
- Cricket
- Cross-country
- Hockey
- Rugby
- Swimming

== Notable alumni ==
- Alistair Campbell, Zimbabwean cricketer
- Donald Campbell, Zimbabwean cricketer
- Douglas Lilford, Rhodesian/Zimbabwean farmer and politician
- Trevor Madondo, Zimbabwean cricketer
- Brendan Taylor, Zimbabwean cricketer
- Malcolm Waller, Zimbabwean cricketer
- Oliver Lilford, PhB student at the ANU
- Ryan Arnott, GBP Banbury Manager

== See also ==
- List of schools in Zimbabwe
