= Ronald Strang =

Zimbabwean cricket umpire (born 1940)

Personal information
- Born: 21 October 1940 (age 86); Salford, Somerset, England

Umpiring information
- ODIs umpired: 1 (1994)
- Source: Cricinfo, 20 May 2014

Ronald Charles Strang (born 21 October 1940) is a Zimbabwean former cricket umpire. He stood in one ODI game in 1994. His sons Paul and Bryan are former Zimbabwean international cricketers.

== See also ==
- List of One Day International cricket umpires
