= Ujesh Ranchod =

Zimbabwean cricketer (born 1969)

Personal information
- Born: 17 May 1969 (age 57); Salisbury, Rhodesia
- Batting: Right-handed
- Bowling: Right-arm offbreak

International information
- National side: Zimbabwe (1992–1993)
- Only Test (cap 15): 13 March 1993 v India
- ODI debut (cap 31): 8 November 1992 v New Zealand
- Last ODI: 3 February 1993 v Sri Lanka

Career statistics
Competition	Test	ODI
Matches	1	3
Runs scored	8	3
Batting average	4.00	–
100s/50s	0/0	0/0
Top score	7	3*
Balls bowled	72	174
Wickets	1	1
Bowling average	45.00	130.00
5 wickets in innings	0	0
10 wickets in match	0	0
Best bowling	1/45	1/44
Catches/stumpings	0/–	1/–
- Source: Cricinfo, 17 August 2019

Ujesh Ranchod (born 17 May 1969) is a Zimbabwean former cricketer who played in one Test match and three One Day International (ODI) matches from 1992 to 1993. His only international Test wicket came when he dismissed Sachin Tendulkar on 13 March 1993 in Delhi. His Test match debut was also his maiden first-class match.
