= David Braine =

David Braine may refer to:

- David Braine (philosopher) (1940–2017), British analytic philosopher
- David Braine (athletic director) (born 1943), former athletic director for Georgia Tech, Virginia Tech, and Marshall

== See also ==
- David Brain (born 1964), Zimbabwean cricketer
- Dave Brain (1879–1959), English baseball player
