= List of Zimbabwe Test cricketers =

This is a list of Zimbabwean Test cricketers.

A Test match is an international cricket match between two representative teams that are full members of the International Cricket Council (ICC). Both teams have two innings, and the match lasts up to five days.

The list is arranged in the order in which each player won his first Test cap for Zimbabwe. Where more than one player won his first Test cap in the same match, their surnames are listed alphabetically.

== Key ==
General

- ‡ – Captain
- † – Wicket-keeper
- First – Year of debut
- Last – Year of latest game
- Mat – Number of matches played

Batting

- Innings – Innings batted
- NO – Times Not out
- Runs – Runs scored in career
- HS – Highest score
- Avg – Runs scored per dismissal
- * – Batsman remained not out

Bowling

- Balls – Balls bowled in career
- Mdn – Maiden overs bowled in career
- Wkt – Wickets taken in career
- BBI – Best bowling in an innings
- Ave – Average runs per wicket

Fielding

- Ca – Catches taken
- St – Stumpings taken

== Players ==
Statistics are correct as of 22 October 2025.

Zimbabwean Test cricketers					Batting					Bowling						Fielding	
Cap	Name	First Test	Last Test	Mat	Inn	NO	Runs	HS	Avg	Balls	Mdn	Runs	Wkt	BBI	Ave	Ca	St
1	Kevin Arnott	1992	1993	4	8	1	302	101*	43.14	–	–	–	–	–	–	4	–
2	Eddo Brandes	1992	1999	10	15	3	121	39	10.08	1996	69	951	26	3/45	36.57	4	–
3	Mark Burmester	1992	1992	3	4	2	54	30*	27.00	436	22	227	3	3/78	75.66	1	–
4	Alistair Campbell ‡	1992	2002	60	109	4	2858	103	27.21	66	2	28	0	–	–	60	–
5	Gary Crocker	1992	1992	3	4	1	69	33	23.00	456	20	217	3	2/65	72.33	0	–
6	Andy Flower ‡†	1992	2002	63	112	19	4794	232*	51.54	3	0	4	0	–	–	151	9
7	Grant Flower	1992	2004	67	123	6	3457	201*	29.54	3378	122	1537	25	4/41	61.48	43	–
8	David Houghton ‡	1992	1997	22	36	2	1464	266	43.05	5	0	0	0	–	–	17	–
9	Malcolm Jarvis	1992	1994	5	3	1	4	2*	2.00	1273	88	393	11	3/30	35.72	2	–
10	Andy Pycroft	1992	1992	3	5	0	152	60	30.40	–	–	–	–	–	–	2	–
11	John Traicos (Note: John Traicos also played three Test matches for South Africa. Only his record for Zimbabwe is listed here.)	1992	1993	4	6	2	11	5	2.75	1141	34	562	14	5/86	40.14	4	–
12	Ali Shah	1992	1996	3	5	0	122	62	24.40	186	9	125	1	1/46	125.00	0	–
13	David Brain	1992	1995	9	13	2	115	28	10.45	1810	54	915	30	5/42	30.50	1	–
14	Gavin Briant	1993	1993	1	2	0	17	16	8.50	–	–	–	–	–	–	0	–
15	Ujesh Ranchod	1993	1993	1	2	0	8	7	4.00	72	0	45	1	1/45	45.00	0	–
16	Glen Bruk-Jackson	1993	1993	2	4	0	39	31	9.75	–	–	–	–	–	–	0	–
17	Mark Dekker	1993	1996	14	22	1	333	68*	15.85	60	4	15	0	–	–	12	–
18	Stephen Peall	1993	1994	4	6	2	60	30	15.00	888	45	303	4	2/89	75.75	1	–
19	John Rennie	1993	1997	4	6	1	62	22	12.40	724	37	293	3	2/22	97.66	1	–
20	Heath Streak ‡	1993	2005	65	107	18	1990	127*	22.35	13559	595	6079	216	6/73	28.14	17	–
21	Guy Whittall	1993	2002	46	82	7	2207	203*	29.42	4686	208	2088	51	4/18	40.94	19	–
22	Wayne James †	1993	1994	4	4	0	61	33	15.25	–	–	–	–	–	–	16	0
23	Paul Strang	1994	2001	24	41	10	839	106*	27.06	5720	211	2522	70	8/109	36.02	15	–
24	Stuart Carlisle ‡	1995	2005	37	66	6	1615	118	26.91	–	–	–	–	–	–	34	–
25	Henry Olonga	1995	2002	30	45	11	184	24	5.41	4502	129	2620	68	5/70	38.52	10	–
26	Bryan Strang	1995	2001	26	45	9	465	53	12.91	5433	306	2203	56	5/101	39.33	11	–
27	Iain Butchart	1995	1995	1	2	0	23	15	11.50	18	0	11	0	–	–	1	–
28	Charlie Lock	1995	1995	1	2	1	8	8*	8.00	180	5	105	5	3/68	21.00	0	–
29	Craig Wishart	1995	2005	27	50	1	1098	114	22.40	–	–	–	–	–	–	15	–
30	Craig Evans	1996	2003	3	6	0	52	22	8.66	54	0	35	0	–	–	1	–
31	Andy Whittall	1996	1999	10	18	3	114	17	7.60	1562	48	736	7	3/73	105.14	8	–
32	Everton Matambanadzo	1996	1999	3	5	1	17	7	4.25	384	10	250	4	2/62	62.50	0	–
33	Pommie Mbangwa	1996	2000	15	25	8	34	8	2.00	2596	149	1006	32	3/23	31.43	2	–
34	Andy Waller	1996	1996	2	3	0	69	50	23.00	–	–	–	–	–	–	1	–
35	Adam Huckle	1997	1998	8	14	3	74	28*	6.72	1568	48	872	25	6/109	34.88	3	–
36	Gavin Rennie	1997	2002	23	46	1	1023	93	22.73	126	0	84	1	1/40	84.00	13	–
37	Murray Goodwin	1998	2000	19	37	4	1414	166*	42.84	119	3	69	0	–	–	10	–
38	Trevor Madondo	1998	2000	3	4	1	90	74*	30.00	–	–	–	–	–	–	1	–
39	Dirk Viljoen	1998	2000	2	4	0	57	38	14.25	105	2	65	1	1/14	65.00	1	–
40	Neil Johnson	1998	2000	13	23	1	532	107	24.18	1186	50	594	15	4/77	39.60	12	–
41	Trevor Gripper	1999	2004	20	38	1	809	112	21.86	793	21	509	6	2/91	84.83	14	–
42	Gary Brent	1999	2001	4	6	0	35	25	5.83	818	39	314	7	3/21	44.85	1	–
43	Ray Price	1999	2013	22	38	8	261	36	8.70	6135	242	2885	80	6/73	36.06	4	–
44	Brian Murphy ‡	2000	2001	11	15	3	123	30	10.25	2153	67	1113	18	3/32	61.83	11	–
45	Mluleki Nkala	2000	2005	10	15	2	187	47	14.38	1452	53	727	11	3/82	66.09	4	–
46	David Mutendera	2000	2000	1	2	0	10	10	5.00	84	4	29	0	–	–	0	–
47	Dougie Marillier	2000	2002	5	7	1	186	73	31.00	616	21	322	11	4/57	29.27	2	–
48	Andy Blignaut	2001	2005	19	36	3	886	92	26.84	3173	101	1964	53	5/73	37.05	13	–
49	Dion Ebrahim	2001	2005	29	55	1	1225	94	22.68	–	–	–	–	–	–	16	–
50	Brighton Watambwa	2001	2002	6	8	5	11	4*	3.66	931	36	490	14	4/64	35.00	0	–
51	Travis Friend	2001	2004	13	19	4	447	81	29.80	2000	63	1090	25	5/31	43.60	2	–
52	Tatenda Taibu ‡†	2001	2012	28	54	3	1546	153	30.31	48	1	27	1	1/27	27.00	57	5
53	Hamilton Masakadza ‡	2001	2018	38	76	2	2223	158	30.04	1164	49	482	16	3/24	30.56	29	–
54	Douglas Hondo	2001	2005	9	15	6	83	19	9.22	1486	50	774	21	6/59	36.85	5	–
55	Blessing Mahwire	2002	2005	10	17	6	147	50*	13.36	1287	35	915	18	4/92	50.83	1	–
56	Mark Vermeulen	2002	2014	9	18	0	449	118	24.94	6	0	5	0	–	–	6	–
57	Sean Ervine	2003	2004	5	8	0	261	86	32.62	570	18	388	9	4/146	43.11	7	–
58	Gavin Ewing	2003	2005	3	6	0	108	71	18.00	426	11	260	2	1/27	130.00	1	–
59	Stuart Matsikenyeri	2003	2005	8	16	1	351	57	23.40	483	6	345	2	1/58	172.50	7	–
60	Vusi Sibanda	2003	2014	14	28	0	591	93	21.10	–	–	–	–	–	–	16	–
61	Elton Chigumbura	2004	2014	14	27	0	569	88	21.07	1806	61	966	21	5/54	46.00	6	–
62	Alester Maregwede	2004	2004	2	4	0	74	28	18.50	–	–	–	–	–	–	1	–
63	Tinashe Panyangara	2004	2014	9	18	6	201	40*	16.75	1889	87	813	31	5/59	26.22	3	–
64	Brendan Taylor ‡†	2004	2025	36	71	4	2403	171	35.86	42	0	38	0	–	–	30	0
65	Prosper Utseya	2004	2013	4	8	1	107	45	15.28	753	16	410	10	3/60	41.00	2	–
66	Tawanda Mupariwa	2004	2004	1	2	1	15	14	15.00	204	1	136	0	–	–	0	–
67	Graeme Cremer ‡	2005	2017	19	38	5	540	102*	16.36	4214	71	2604	57	5/125	45.68	12	–
68	Christopher Mpofu	2005	2017	15	28	10	105	33	5.83	2489	86	1392	29	4/92	48.00	4	–
69	Barney Rogers	2005	2005	4	8	0	90	29	11.25	18	0	17	0	–	–	1	–
70	Neil Ferreira	2005	2005	1	2	0	21	16	10.50	–	–	–	–	–	–	0	–
71	Keith Dabengwa	2005	2005	3	6	0	90	35	15.00	438	10	249	5	3/127	49.80	1	–
72	Charles Coventry	2005	2005	2	4	0	88	37	22.00	–	–	–	–	–	–	3	–
73	Terry Duffin	2005	2005	2	4	0	80	56	20.00	–	–	–	–	–	–	1	–
74	Waddington Mwayenga	2005	2005	1	2	1	15	14*	15.00	126	6	79	1	1/79	79.00	0	–
75	Craig Ervine ‡	2011	2025	31	61	3	1931	160	33.29	–	–	–	–	–	–	27	–
76	Kyle Jarvis	2011	2020	13	24	10	128	25*	9.14	2511	79	1354	46	5/54	29.43	3	–
77	Tino Mawoyo	2011	2016	11	22	1	615	163*	29.28	–	–	–	–	–	–	7	–
78	Brian Vitori	2011	2013	4	7	2	52	19*	10.40	833	25	464	12	5/61	38.66	2	–
79	Greg Lamb	2011	2011	1	2	0	46	39	23.00	192	2	141	3	3/120	47.00	2	–
80	Regis Chakabva †	2011	2021	22	43	4	1061	101	27.20	–	–	–	–	–	–	46	5
81	Njabulo Ncube	2011	2011	1	2	0	17	14	8.50	210	4	121	1	1/80	121.00	1	–
82	Malcolm Waller	2011	2017	14	28	1	577	72*	21.37	456	8	218	8	4/59	27.25	10	–
83	Shingirai Masakadza	2012	2014	5	9	1	88	24	11.00	1057	34	515	16	4/32	32.18	2	–
84	Forster Mutizwa	2012	2012	1	2	0	24	18	12.00	–	–	–	–	–	–	0	–
85	Tendai Chatara	2013	2024	10	18	3	94	22	6.26	1824	92	728	26	5/61	28.00	0	–
86	Sean Williams ‡	2013	2025	24	47	4	1946	154	45.25	2488	44	1309	26	3/20	50.34	22	–
87	Timycen Maruma	2013	2021	4	7	0	68	41	9.71	–	–	–	–	–	–	1	–
88	Keegan Meth	2013	2013	2	4	1	72	31*	24.00	324	18	98	4	2/41	24.50	0	–
89	Richmond Mutumbami †	2013	2014	6	12	1	217	43	19.72	–	–	–	–	–	–	17	2
90	Sikandar Raza	2013	2025	22	42	0	1434	127	34.14	3335	68	1782	40	7/113	44.55	7	–
91	John Nyumbu	2014	2016	3	6	1	38	14	7.60	663	11	379	5	5/157	75.80	2	–
92	Donald Tiripano	2014	2023	16	31	7	531	95	22.12	2693	99	1273	26	3/23	48.96	5	–
93	Tafadzwa Kamungozi	2014	2014	1	2	0	5	5	2.50	156	6	58	1	1/51	58.00	0	–
94	Brian Chari	2014	2018	7	14	0	254	80	18.14	18	0	12	0	–	–	8	–
95	Natsai Mushangwe	2014	2014	2	4	0	8	8	2.00	790	16	435	7	4/82	62.14	2	–
96	Chamu Chibhabha	2016	2023	5	10	0	175	60	17.50	246	4	162	1	1/44	162.00	0	–
97	Michael Chinouya	2016	2016	2	4	2	1	1	0.50	342	14	188	3	1/45	62.66	0	–
98	Prince Masvaure	2016	2025	10	19	1	451	74	25.05	84	0	61	0	–	–	2	–
99	Peter Moor (Note: Peter Moor also played Test matches for Ireland. Only his record for Zimbabwe is listed here.) †	2016	2018	8	16	1	533	83	35.53	–	–	–	–	–	–	9	1
100	Carl Mumba	2016	2020	3	4	2	25	11*	8.33	599	17	354	10	4/50	35.40	2	–
101	Tarisai Musakanda	2017	2021	5	9	0	134	43	14.88	–	–	–	–	–	–	4	–
102	Solomon Mire	2017	2017	2	4	0	78	47	19.50	84	2	32	1	1/22	32.00	0	–
103	Tendai Chisoro	2017	2021	3	5	0	27	9	5.40	693	23	333	6	3/113	55.50	1	–
104	Ryan Burl	2017	2021	3	5	0	24	16	4.80	228	3	107	4	2/16	26.75	1	–
105	Blessing Muzarabani	2017	2025	18	32	9	288	47	12.52	3161	99	1756	67	7/58	26.20	2	–
106	Wellington Masakadza	2018	2025	7	14	2	159	57	13.25	1381	37	790	19	4/98	41.57	5	–
107	Brandon Mavuta	2018	2024	5	8	0	82	56	10.25	1002	11	632	12	5/140	52.66	4	–
108	Kevin Kasuza	2020	2021	7	12	1	249	63	22.63	–	–	–	–	–	–	3	–
109	Brian Mudzinganyama	2020	2020	1	1	0	16	16	16.00	–	–	–	–	–	–	0	–
110	Ainsley Ndlovu	2020	2020	2	4	0	9	5	2.25	420	7	277	2	2/170	138.50	2	–
111	Victor Nyauchi	2020	2025	11	16	7	77	13*	7.70	1688	47	960	23	5/56	41.73	4	–
112	Tinotenda Mutombodzi	2020	2020	1	2	0	41	33	20.50	114	3	67	0	–	–	1	–
113	Charlton Tshuma	2020	2020	1	2	0	3	3	1.50	150	2	85	1	1/85	85.00	0	–
114	Wessly Madhevere	2021	2025	8	15	1	244	84	17.42	474	7	285	7	2/2	40.71	5	–
115	Roy Kaia	2021	2021	3	6	0	59	48	9.83	180	2	165	0	–	–	1	–
116	Richard Ngarava	2021	2025	11	18	4	136	28*	9.71	1644	40	964	25	5/37	38.56	1	–
117	Milton Shumba	2021	2023	4	8	0	111	41	13.87	370	8	250	1	1/64	250.00	1	–
118	Luke Jongwe	2021	2021	1	2	0	56	37	28.00	102	1	68	1	1/68	68.00	0	–
119	Takudzwanashe Kaitano	2021	2025	6	12	0	258	87	21.50	–	–	–	–	–	–	6	–
120	Dion Myers	2021	2025	5	10	0	174	57	17.40	33	1	27	0	–	–	4	–
121	Gary Ballance (Note: Gary Ballance also played twenty-three Test matches for England. Only his record for Zimbabwe is listed here.)	2023	2023	1	2	1	155	137*	155.00	–	–	–	–	–	–	0	–
122	Brad Evans	2023	2025	2	3	1	42	35*	21.00	309	7	165	7	5/22	23.57	1	–
123	Innocent Kaia	2023	2023	2	4	0	172	67	43.00	–	–	–	–	–	–	1	–
124	Tanunurwa Makoni	2023	2023	2	4	0	43	33	10.75	–	–	–	–	–	–	1	–
125	Tafadzwa Tsiga †	2023	2025	9	17	3	206	33*	14.71	–	–	–	–	–	–	13	2
126	Tanaka Chivanga	2023	2025	8	15	4	76	22	6.90	888	14	700	17	4/83	41.17	2	–
127	Brian Bennett	2024	2025	11	19	2	509	139	29.94	528	4	335	6	5/95	55.83	18	–
128	Joylord Gumbie †	2024	2025	3	6	0	129	49	21.50	–	–	–	–	–	–	6	0
129	Clive Madande	2024	2024	1	2	0	10	10	5.00	–	–	–	–	–	–	3	–
130	Ben Curran	2024	2025	8	15	0	495	121	33.00	–	–	–	–	–	–	8	–
131	Trevor Gwandu	2024	2025	3	5	1	23	18*	5.75	414	2	354	5	2/28	70.80	1	–
132	Newman Nyamhuri	2024	2025	4	7	0	55	26	7.85	486	8	319	6	3/42	53.16	1	–
133	Johnathan Campbell ‡	2025	2025	1	2	0	37	33	18.50	84	1	47	1	1/47	47.00	1	0
134	Nyasha Mayavo †	2025	2025	2	4	0	62	35	15.50	–	–	–	–	–	–	9	–
135	Nick Welch	2025	2025	8	15	1	368	90	26.28	–	–	–	–	–	–	8	–
136	Vincent Masekesa	2025	2025	4	8	1	38	11*	5.42	572	3	462	10	5/115	46.20	2	0
137	Kundai Matigimu	2025	2025	1	2	0	0	0	0.00	129	1	124	2	2/124	62.00	0	0

== See also ==
- Test cricket
- Zimbabwe national cricket team
- List of Zimbabwe ODI cricketers
- List of Zimbabwe Twenty20 International cricketers
