= Nigel Fleming =

Zimbabwean cricket umpire (born 1951)

Personal information
- Born: 17 August 1951 (age 75); Mutare, Southern Rhodesia

Umpiring information
- ODIs umpired: 1 (1994)
- Source: Cricinfo, 18 May 2014

Nigel Fleming (born 17 August 1951) is a Zimbabwean former cricket umpire. His only international fixture as an umpire was a One Day International between Zimbabwe and Sri Lanka in November 1994.

== See also ==
- List of One Day International cricket umpires
