= Denis Streak =

Zimbabwean cricketer (born 1949)

Personal information
- Full name: Denis Milton Streak
- Born: 21 June 1949 (age 77); Bulawayo, Rhodesia
- Batting: Right-handed
- Bowling: Right-arm fast-medium
- Relatives: Heath Streak (son)

Career statistics
Competition	First-class	List A
Matches	14	5
Runs scored	228	–
Batting average	17.53	–
100s/50s	0/0	–/–
Top score	29	–
Balls bowled	1,414	171
Wickets	16	8
Bowling average	41.06	18.00
5 wickets in innings	0	0
10 wickets in match	0	0
Best bowling	4/81	4/45
Catches/stumpings	5/–	0/–
- Source: CricInfo, 26 December 2018

Denis Hilton Streak (born 21 June 1949) is a Zimbabwean former first-class cricketer and the father of former Zimbabwean cricketer, Heath Streak. Apart from playing cricket, he also represented Zimbabwe at lawn bowls.

He debuted for Rhodesia during the 1976-77 Currie Cup and toured England in 1985. Streak played domestic cricket with Matabeleland and was 46 when he finally retired. He finished by playing in a Logan Cup final win, in the same side as his son. After retiring, Streak briefly served as a Zimbabwean selector.

Streak's farm was seized in 2001 under a land reform policy and he ended up imprisoned for a short time for protesting the farm seizure.
