= Guy Whittall =

Zimbabwean cricketer

Personal information
- Full name: Guy James Whittall
- Born: 5 September 1972 (age 54); Chipinge, Rhodesia
- Batting: Right-handed
- Bowling: Right-arm medium
- Role: Batsman
- Relatives: Andy Whittall (cousin)

International information
- National side: Zimbabwe
- Test debut (cap 21): 1 December 1992 v Pakistan
- Last Test: 9 November 2002 v Pakistan
- ODI debut (cap 35): 15 November 1993 v Sri Lanka
- Last ODI: 8 March 2003 v New Zealand
- ODI shirt no.: 2

Domestic team information
- Years: Team
- 1993/94–1998/99: Matabeleland
- 1999/00–2002/03: Manicaland

Career statistics
Competition	Test	ODI	FC	LA
Matches	46	147	108	207
Runs scored	2,207	2,705	5,639	3,970
Batting average	29.42	22.54	32.97	23.77
100s/50s	4/10	0/11	11/27	1/19
Top score	203*	83	247	106*
Balls bowled	4,686	4,060	10,099	5,868
Wickets	51	88	141	132
Bowling average	40.94	39.55	34.58	37.43
5 wickets in innings	0	0	2	0
10 wickets in match	0	0	0	0
Best bowling	4/18	4/35	6/34	4/35
Catches/stumpings	19/0	36/0	63/0	59/0
- Source: Cricinfo, 30 October 2013

Guy James Whittall (born 5 September 1972) is a former Zimbabwean international cricketer who played 46 Test matches and 147 One Day Internationals (ODIs) and captained Zimbabwe in four ODIs. He played as an all-rounder and was known as an aggressive middle-order batsman and an effective medium pace bowler. Whittall escaped from a leopard attack on 25 April 2024 with injuries.

== Early life ==
Whittall born at Chipinge in what was then Rhodesia in 1972. The son of farmers, he was educated at Ruzawi School and then Falcon College where he captained the school cricket XI and played both hockey and rugby union. He was selected for the national schools cricket side aged 16 and toured New Zealand and England. The side was coached by former international David Houghton and they were unbeaten on both tours. His first Logan Cup century came for Zimbabwe Schools against Harare Central, although the tournament did not have first class status at the time.

Whittall also played rugby for Zimbabwe schools, playing as a centre. He went on to play for the national side, including going as a squad member to the qualification tournament for the 1995 Rugby World Cup.

== Cricket career ==
His first-class cricket debut came at the age of 18, playing for Young Zimbabwe. He first played for Zimbabwe against Worcestershire, opening the batting and was selected for the Zimbabwean team to tour England in 1993. Although he would not get a game in England, he was included in the side for the tour to Pakistan later the same year.

Whittall made his Test debut in December against Pakistan, scoring 33 runs and taking the wicket of Basit Ali. He made his maiden Test century in his sixth Test, at Harare Sports Club in February 1995, making an unbeaten 113 to help his side to a historic first Test victory against the touring Pakistanis. Two years later he scored Zimbabwe's first double-century, making an unbeaten 203 at Queens Sports Club against New Zealand. Whittall was short of his double ton when the number 11, Everton Matambanadzo, came in to bat. The New Zealanders did their bit to help, giving field placings designed to allow easy singles thus giving Matambanadzo the strike. The milestone eventually came with a boundary through the slips.

Against the same opponents in September 2002, Whittall fell just short of registering another double hundred, finishing unbeaten on 188 in controversial circumstances when Pommie Mbangwa was run out with Whittall possibly impeded by Dion Nash.

Although he never took a five wicket haul, Whittall took over 50 Test wickets for Zimbabwe. His career best was 4/18 against England. His ODI career included three World Cups, and he did particularly well in 1999 as Zimbabwe made the final six.

In 2000, he became the first fielder for Zimbabwe to take four catches in an innings of an ODI
