= Donald Campbell (Zimbabwean cricketer) =

Zimbabwean cricketer (born 1974)

Personal information
- Full name: Donald James Ross Campbell
- Born: 24 June 1974 (age 52); Harare, Zimbabwe
- Batting: Right-handed
- Role: Wicket-keeper
- Relatives: Alistair Campbell (brother); Johnathan Campbell (nephew)

Domestic team information
- Years: Team
- 1992/93–2003: Mashonaland

Career statistics
Competition	First-class	List A
Matches	53	14
Runs scored	1,512	159
Batting average	19.89	13.25
100s/50s	0/6	0/0
Top score	79	48
Catches/stumpings	118/13	9/–
- Source: Cricinfo, 5 December 2022

Donald James Ross Campbell (born 24 June 1974) is a former Zimbabwean first-class cricketer. He played as a wicket-keeper and is the younger brother of Zimbabwean Test cricketer Alistair Campbell. Donald captained Harare Sports Club during his career.
