= Pommie Mbangwa =

Zimbabwean cricketer and commentator

Personal information
- Full name: Mpumelelo Mbangwa
- Born: 26 June 1976 (age 50); Plumtree, Rhodesia
- Nickname: Pommie
- Batting: Right-handed
- Bowling: Right-arm fast-medium
- Role: Bowler

International information
- National side: Zimbabwe (1996–2002)
- Test debut (cap 33): 24 October 1996 v Pakistan
- Last Test: 19 September 2000 v New Zealand
- ODI debut (cap 48): 1 November 1996 v Pakistan
- Last ODI: 18 September 2002 v England

Domestic team information
- Years: Team
- 1995/96–2003/04: Matabeleland

Career statistics
Competition	Test	ODI	FC	LA
Matches	15	29	62	64
Runs scored	34	34	324	88
Batting average	2.00	4.85	6.89	4.63
100s/50s	0/0	0/0	0/0	0/0
Top score	8	11	31*	28
Balls bowled	2,596	1,369	8,627	2,871
Wickets	32	11	126	38
Bowling average	31.43	103.63	28.41	54.39
5 wickets in innings	0	0	2	0
10 wickets in match	0	0	1	0
Best bowling	3/23	2/24	6/14	3/29
Catches/stumpings	2/–	3/–	21/–	17/–
- Source: ESPNcricinfo, 8 August 2015

Mpumelelo "Pommie" Mbangwa (born 26 June 1976) is a Zimbabwean cricket commentator and former cricketer. A right-arm fast bowler, he played 15 Test matches and 29 One Day Internationals for Zimbabwe between 1996 and 2002. After being dropped from the international side after the 2002 Champions Trophy, he took up work as a cricket commentator for television, and he has remained in that line of work since. He holds the unique distinction of being the only batsman to have scored exactly the same amount of career runs in two formats (ODIs and Tests) with 34 runs each apiece in ODIs and Tests.

His nickname "Pommie" (also simply called "Pom") is a shortened version and anglicisation of his full name, dubbed to him by former Zimbabwe player Gavin Rennie during their junior levels as everyone had trouble saying his first name. It is often mistakenly attributed to his cultivated accent a testament to his formative school years that were undertaken at a private school in Zimbabwe, a fact that is made obvious by his intonation and pronunciation of certain words and phrases.

Given a qualification of twenty innings, Mbangwa has the lowest batting average (2.00) of all Test cricketers. However, as of 2008, he was one of nine Zimbabweans to have taken 30 Test wickets, and of those only Heath Streak and David Brain took them at a lower average. He is also currently regarded as one of the best international cricket commentators and he is also the leading cricket commentator from Zimbabwe.

== Early life ==
Mbangwa completed his primary education at the Matabeleland primary school and at the Rhodes Estate Preparatory School. He was introduced to cricket at the Rhodes Estate Preparatory School at the age of 10 and was chosen for the Matabeleland Primary School cricket team at 11. He then pursued his secondary education at the Milton High School where he continued to play cricket and rugby. He was mentored by his high school house master Ian Kemp who took a special interest in him and also assisted him with his bowling action. He also made his mark as a batsman when he scored 113 opening the batting in an inter-school match at the age of 14.

He was also selected for Zimbabwe U15 team for the tour of Namibia. He was also chosen to play for Matabeleland school cricket team in a match in 1994 against touring Dean Close School from England where he impressed with the ball taking four wickets being the chief destroyer of the Dean Close team which was bowled out for 72. His impressive bowling performance earned him a scholarship to play for Dean Close in the 1995 English season at the age of 17. He received the nickname "Pommie" while studying at the Dean Close School in England with fellow students unable to pronounce his first name Mpumelelo.

== Career ==
Mbangwa's rise to prominence was all the more remarkable as he had no family background in cricket. A little short of the top pace, he was primarily a line-and-length bowler, using both seam and swing, with the away-swinger his stock ball. He spent a year at school in England, and in 1996 he went to Madras for coaching by Dennis Lillee at the MRF Pace Foundation; on his return he was offered a place in the Plascon Academy in South Africa, which he attended from April to September 1996.

A surprise choice for the Zimbabwe tour of Pakistan in 1996–97, he made his Test debut after the first choice bowlers Heath Streak and Eddo Brandes were injured but made the most of his opportunity, taking the vital wickets of Ijaz Ahmed and Wasim Akram despite Zimbabwe losing the match by 10 wickets. But thereafter he struggled to maintain consistency, and his lack of pace meant that he was easy picking for international batsmen. He drifted in and out of the side, before disappearing from the international scene. He was also well known for his brief yet important unbeaten innings of four runs in a Test match against Sri Lanka in 1998 batting at number 10 where his resilient patient innings at the crease helped Andy Flower to score Test century, meanwhile on the other hand Muttiah Muralitharan and Sanath Jayasuriya were still threatening with the ball. Zimbabwe had lost eight wickets in that innings when Andy Flower was still in the crease on 91. Andy Flower also fondly referred to him as "Pomster" during the match when he urged Pommie to not throw his wicket away while Flower was nearing the milestone. He was selected to the Zimbabwean squad for the 50 over cricket tournament at the 1998 Commonwealth Games where Zimbabwe finished fifth in the competition.

He was one of international cricket's genuine No. 11s although he was also named in one of the worst tailenders XI in Rest cricket for being involved with nine ducks in 25 innings batting at 11.

He also featured in the 1999 Cricket World Cup where Zimbabwe progressed to super six stage. He also then played for Zimbabwe at the 2002 ICC Champions Trophy. He ended up his 6 year international career playing for Zimbabwe following the 2002 Champions Trophy and then moved to England to pursue his higher studies for a brief period of time. He also played for Matabeleland cricket team in the Logan Cup from 1996 to 2004.

In 2001 he started television commentary, where his quiet thoughtful views were well received, and in 2005 he ended a brief foray into coaching by committing full-time to his TV career. He worked as a commentator with SuperSport and Star Sports and has notably served as one of the commentators during the 2015 Cricket World Cup, 2018 Cricket World Cup Qualifier and 2019 Cricket World Cup. He is also a regular commentator in franchise T20 leagues such as Indian Premier League and Pakistan Super League.

== Outside cricket ==
He has also been involved in many awareness campaigns including being an ambassador for North Star Alliance, an organisation which uses cricket as a tool to raise awareness about HIV/AIDS in Southern Africa. He was appointed as the ambassador for North Star Alliance in 2009.

== Controversy ==
Although known for his neutral commentary style and for his friendly banter, much to everyone’s surprise he criticised South African wicketkeeper batsman Quinton de Kock for his refusal to take a knee as part of CSA’s BLM stance. He was critical of de Kock when providing commentary alongside former West Indies all-rounder and head coach of the West Indies Daren Sammy during the encounter between South Africa and the West Indies in the 2021 ICC Men's T20 World Cup. Pommie said “Excuse me for being political, but I cannot shed my skin” before giving an explanation and a valid reason for his argument about de Kock’s stance.
