= Stephen Peall =

Zimbabwean cricketer (born 1969)

Personal information
- Full name: Stephen Guy Peall
- Born: 9 February 1969 (age 57); Salisbury, Rhodesia
- Batting: Left-handed
- Bowling: Right-arm offbreak
- Role: Bowler

International information
- National side: Zimbabwe
- Test debut (cap 18): 1 December 1993 v Pakistan
- Last Test: 20 October 1994 v Sri Lanka
- ODI debut (cap 29): 31 October 1992 v New Zealand
- Last ODI: 6 March 1996 v India

Domestic team information
- Years: Team
- 1990/91–1995/96: Mashonaland

Career statistics
Competition	Test	ODI	FC	LA
Matches	4	21	32	39
Runs scored	60	91	709	201
Batting average	15.00	6.50	18.65	8.04
100s/50s	0/0	0/0	0/0	0/1
Top score	30	18	44	61
Balls bowled	888	900	6,028	1,818
Wickets	4	8	67	16
Bowling average	75.75	84.75	42.97	83.43
5 wickets in innings	0	1	1	1
10 wickets in match	0	0	1	0
Best bowling	2/89	3/54	9/76	3/54
Catches/stumpings	1/–	1/–	15/–	4/–
- Source: ESPNcricinfo, 9 August 2015

Stephen Guy Peall (born 2 September 1969) is a former Zimbabwean cricketer who played in four Test matches and 21 One Day Internationals between 1992 and 1996.
