= Tafadzwa Madondo =

Zimbabwean cricketer (1981–2008)

Personal information
- Full name: Tafadzwa Bernard Madondo
- Born: 17 February 1981; Bindura, Mashonaland Central, Zimbabwe
- Died: 17 November 2008 (aged 27); Bali, Indonesia
- Batting: Right-handed
- Bowling: Right-arm off break
- Role: Wicket-keeper
- Relatives: Trevor Madondo (brother)

Domestic team information
- Years: Team
- 2000/01: Manicaland

Career statistics
Competition	First-class
Matches	1
Runs scored	10
Batting average	5.00
100s/50s	–
Top score	10
Balls bowled	–
Wickets	–
Bowling average	–
5 wickets in innings	–
10 wickets in match	–
Best bowling	–
Catches/stumpings	–/–
- Source: Cricinfo, 4 April 2012

Tafadzwa Bernard Madondo (17 February 1981 – 17 November 2008) was a Zimbabwean cricketer. He was a right-handed batsman and right-arm off-break bowler and wicketkeeper who played for Manicaland. Born in Bindura, he was the brother of Test player Trevor Madondo.

Madondo made a single first-class appearance for the side, during the 2000–01 season, against Matabeleland. Batting in the lower order, Madondo scored ten runs in the first innings in which he batted, and a golden duck in the second innings, with Ian Engelbrecht trapping his second batsman in two balls leg before wicket. He was a tailend batsman.

He attended Falcon College.

He was killed at the age of 27, in November 2008, when he crashed his motorbike while vacationing in Bali.
