= Bryan Strang =

Zimbabwean cricketer (born 1972)

Personal information
- Full name: Bryan Colin Strang
- Born: 9 June 1972 (age 54); Bulawayo, Rhodesia
- Batting: Right-handed
- Bowling: Left-arm medium
- Role: Bowler
- Relatives: Paul Strang (brother)

International information
- National side: Zimbabwe
- Test debut (cap 26): 7 February 1995 v Pakistan
- Last Test: 27 July 2001 v West Indies
- ODI debut (cap 40): 22 February 1995 v Pakistan
- Last ODI: 1 July 2001 v West Indies

Career statistics
Competition	Test	ODI	FC	LA
Matches	26	49	74	78
Runs scored	465	92	1,267	237
Batting average	12.91	5.11	14.90	8.46
100s/50s	0/1	0/0	0/5	0/1
Top score	53	18	73	61
Balls bowled	5,433	2,494	15,174	4,018
Wickets	56	46	252	81
Bowling average	39.33	37.34	25.40	32.85
5 wickets in innings	1	1	14	1
10 wickets in match	0	0	1	0
Best bowling	5/101	6/20	7/20	6/20
Catches/stumpings	11/–	15/–	22/–	25/–
- Source: ESPNcricinfo, 9 August 2015

Bryan Colin Strang (born 9 June 1972) is a former Zimbabwean international cricketer who played in 26 Test matches and 49 One Day Internationals between 1995 and 2001. His older brother Paul Strang also played international cricket for Zimbabwe.

== Domestic career ==
In 2001, Strang helped bowl Matabeleland out for a national record low score in first-class cricket of 19 runs, taking 5 wickets for 6 runs.

== International career ==
Strang was a left-arm medium bowler and due to his nagging accuracy was hard to get away in ODI cricket. This earned him a career economy rate of 4.13. His best bowling figures in ODI cricket of 6 for 20, against Bangladesh in 1997, are a Zimbabwean record.

He played his last game for Zimbabwe in July 2001 and in 2002 he moved to South Africa due to political unrest. He became a vocal critic of Zimbabwean cricket and during the 2003 World Cup stated that Zimbabwe should be barred from hosting World Cup matches on moral grounds. As a result, when he attempted a comeback in 2003–04 the Zimbabwean Cricket Union banned him.

Following the lifting of the ban in 2005, Strang made a comeback and was recalled for a training squad ahead of the New Zealand and India tours of Zimbabwe and played for Zimbabwe A against Pakistan A in 2006. However, he was later informed by Zimbabwe Cricket that his services were no longer required.

== Beyond cricket ==
In 2008 he received an honorary degree in Sports Sciences from the University of Newcastle upon Tyne, making him eligible for their crunch cricket match against the University of Edinburgh in July.

Since returning to Zimbabwe, he went into cricket coaching at schools like Lilfordia School and St. George's College in Harare. He has done lots more coaching at many levels.

In 2009, he expressed that he is looking for an opportunity to get involved with ZC to contribute more. He wants to coach which he really loves and if he is needed to play, he is more than willing as he thinks that he is enough fit and ready to do so. He thinks that he has still got a lot to offer as a player.

He was involved in teaching at St. John's Prep School in the sports department. He coaches at Lilfordia School, where Alistair Campbell and his father are also heavily involved. He has also opened a business about life skills and goal setting.

At the end of October 2009, he left his school teaching.
