= Trevor Madondo =

Zimbabwean cricketer (1976–2001)

Personal information
- Full name: Trevor Nyasha Madondo
- Born: 22 November 1976; Mount Darwin, Mashonaland, Zimbabwe
- Died: 11 June 2001 (aged 24); Parirenyatwa Hospital, Harare, Zimbabwe
- Batting: Right-handed
- Bowling: Right-arm medium

Career statistics
| Competition | Test | ODI | FC |
|---|---|---|---|
| Matches | 3 | 13 | 21 |
| Runs scored | 90 | 191 | 653 |
| Batting average | 30.00 | 15.91 | 21.06 |
| 100s/50s | 0/1 | 0/1 | 0/4 |
| Top score | 74* | 71 | 74* |
| Balls bowled | – | – | 24 |
| Wickets | – | – | 1 |
| Bowling average | – | – | 28.00 |
| 5 wickets in innings | – | – | 0 |
| 10 wickets in match | – | – | 0 |
| Best bowling | – | – | 1/23 |
| Catches/stumpings | 1/– | 2/– | 13/– |
- Source: Cricinfo, 16 September 2013

Trevor Nyasha Madondo (22 November 1976 – 11 June 2001) was a Zimbabwean cricketer who played in three Test matches and 13 One Day Internationals from 1998 to 2001.

Growing up, Madondo attended Lilfordia School and Falcon College. At Falcon, he also played hockey and rugby union. He gave up his studies at Rhodes University to become a full-time cricketer. A middle-order batsman, he hit his highest first-class score in his last Test when he scored 74 not out against New Zealand in 2000–01.

He died a few months later at the age of 24 from malaria. He was the fifth-youngest Test player to die. In November 2008, his brother Tafadzwa Madondo died in a motorbike accident while vacationing in Bali.
