= Heath Streak =

Zimbabwean cricketer (1974–2023)

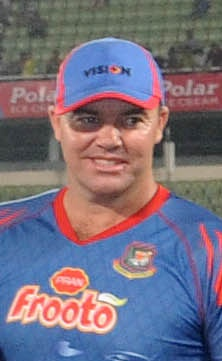
- Heath in 2015

Personal information
- Full name: Heath Hilton Streak
- Born: 16 March 1974; Bulawayo, Rhodesia
- Died: 3 September 2023 (aged 49); Matabeleland, Zimbabwe
- Nickname: Streaky, Stack
- Height: 184 cm (6 ft 0 in)
- Batting: Right-handed
- Bowling: Right-arm fast-medium
- Role: All-rounder
- Relatives: Denis Streak (father)

International information
- National side: Zimbabwe (1993–2005)
- Test debut (cap 20): 1 December 1993 v Pakistan
- Last Test: 20 September 2005 v India
- ODI debut (cap 34): 10 November 1993 v South Africa
- Last ODI: 31 August 2005 v New Zealand
- ODI shirt no.: 9

Domestic team information
- Years: Team
- 1993/94–2003/04: Matabeleland
- 1995: Hampshire
- 2004–2007: Warwickshire
- 2007/08–2008/09: Ahmedabad Rockets

Career statistics
Competition	Test	ODI	FC	LA
Matches	65	189	175	309
Runs scored	1,990	2,942	5,684	4,088
Batting average	22.35	28.28	26.31	25.71
100s/50s	1/11	0/13	6/27	0/14
Top score	127*	79*	131	90*
Balls bowled	13,559	9,468	31,117	14,741
Wickets	216	239	499	385
Bowling average	28.14	29.82	28.76	28.55
5 wickets in innings	7	1	17	1
10 wickets in match	0	0	2	0
Best bowling	6/73	5/32	7/55	5/32
Catches/stumpings	17/–	46/–	58/–	75/–
- Source: ESPNcricinfo, 24 December 2018

Heath Hilton Streak (16 March 1974 – 3 September 2023) was a Zimbabwean cricketer and cricket coach who played for and captained the Zimbabwe national cricket team. He was the all time leading wicket taker for Zimbabwe in Test cricket with 216 wickets and in ODI cricket with 239 wickets.

Streak remains the only Zimbabwean cricketer to have taken over 100 Test wickets and completed the double of 2,000 runs and 200 wickets in ODIs. He was also one of only four Zimbabwean bowlers to have taken over 100 ODI wickets. He holds the record for the most five-wicket hauls by a Zimbabwean in Tests, having achieved the feat seven times.

Streak was part of the 'golden era' of Zimbabwe cricket between 1997 and 2002. His relationship with Zimbabwe Cricket soured on several occasions during his international career, as well as during his coaching career.

In September 2018, Streak submitted an application to the court to have Zimbabwe Cricket liquidated in relation to outstanding debts. In April 2021, Streak was handed an eight-year ban by the ICC for corruption.

== Early life ==
Streak was born in Bulawayo, Rhodesia (now Zimbabwe) and hailed from a family whose background primarily involved ranching in Bulawayo. He completed his education at the Rhodes Estate Preparatory School and Falcon College. His father, Denis Streak, was also a first-class cricketer. He held a junior hunter's licence prior to becoming a professional cricketer.

== Domestic career ==
Streak made his first-class debut for Zimbabwe B against the touring Kent team on 30 March 1993 at Harare Sports Club.

In 1995/96, Streak played in the same Matabeleland team as his 46-year-old father Denis in the final of the Lonrho Logan Cup against Mashonaland Country Districts; this was the first instance of a father and son playing in the same first-class match for more than thirty years. Matabeleland eventually crowned as champions of the 1996 Logan Cup. He made his T20 debut representing Warwickshire against Glamorgan on 8 July 2004.

Streak was appointed the captain of Warwickshire in 2006 after signing a two-year contract. However, on 25 April 2007, Streak resigned as Warwickshire captain after featuring in just one match in the 2007 county season, indicating that captaining the side was affecting his on field abilities. He was replaced as captain by Darren Maddy. At the end of the 2007 season, he left Warwickshire citing family reasons.

At the end of the year of 2007, Streak joined the Ahmedabad Rockets in the controversial Indian Cricket League which ultimately ended his international career.

== International career ==
=== Early career ===
Streak made his ODI debut on 10 November 1993 against South Africa. A month later, he made his test debut in Zimbabwe's tour of Pakistan 1993/1994 (on 1 December 1993). He made his mark in international cricket by taking 8 wickets in the 2nd Test at Rawalpindi (9–14 December 1993). Streak won the Player of the series award on his debut test series for his impressive performance with the ball taking 22 wickets at an average of 13.54. It is also the most number of wickets taken by a Zimbabwean bowler in a test series.

=== Rising through the ranks ===
Streak bettered his best bowling figures in 1995 when Pakistan toured Zimbabwe, taking 6/90 in the first Test at Harare which Zimbabwe won by an innings. On 13 January 1996 in a test match against New Zealand at Hamilton, he became the fastest Zimbabwean bowler to take 50 test wickets in 11 matches. He was also part of Zimbabwe side which secured first test win against Pakistan in Pakistan soil in 1998. In 2000/2001, he won 2-man of the series awards, first in Zimbabwe's tour of England and then in Bangladesh's tour of Zimbabwe. In a test match in 2000 against England at Lord's, he picked up 6/87 and became the first and only Zimbabwean to take a fifer at Lord's. He is also the only Zimbabwean to be on the Lord's honours boards.

His debut World Cup appearance came during the 1996 Cricket World Cup and was part of Zimbabwe team which reached super sixes stage for the first time during the 1999 Cricket World Cup. He was also part of the Zimbabwean side which finished fifth at the 1998 Commonwealth Games in men's cricket competition and was part of the Zimbabwean side which played in the preliminary match against New Zealand in the inaugural edition of the ICC Champions Trophy in 1998. On 11 June 1999, he became the first as well as the fastest Zimbabwean bowler to take 100 ODI wickets.

=== Captaincy ===
Streak claimed in an interview in The Observer that he was faced with moral challenges in captaining Zimbabwe. He said that he was asked to falsely tell white players that they were not talented enough and were to be replaced by black players.

Streak was appointed as the captain of Zimbabwe side in 2000 for both test and ODI formats. During his captaincy tenure, he embroiled in tensions with the cricket board over pay and quota issues which also caused him to step down from the captaincy in 2001. Under his captaincy, Zimbabwe produced an upset victory against India in a test match in 2001 at home where Zimbabwe secured their first ever test win against India by four wickets. He was also known for his brutal bowling spell of 4/8 in an ODI against West Indies during the 2001 Australia Tri-series where Zimbabwe defeated West Indies by 47 runs in a low scoring affair. On 4 February 2001, in an ODI against Australia he became the first Zimbabwean bowler to take 150 ODI wickets. He along with Andy Blignaut set the highest seventh wicket partnership for Zimbabwe in test cricket by adding 154 runs during a test match against West Indies in July 2001 at Harare. On 7 October 2001, he along with Andy Flower set the highest seventh wicket partnership for Zimbabwe in ODI by adding 130 runs against England.

Streak was again appointed as the captain in 2002 and he was again in the spotlight in the wake of Zimbabwe's political crisis. He captained Zimbabwe team in the 2000 ICC KnockOut Trophy and at the 2002 ICC Champions Trophy.

Streak also captained the Zimbabwean team at the 2003 World Cup, a tournament marred by political tensions in Zimbabwe. During the 2003 World Cup, his teammates Andy Flower and Henry Olonga wore black armbands in the match against Namibia at the Harare Sports Club, to "mourn the death of democracy" in Zimbabwe, which made international headlines. Under his captaincy, Zimbabwe reached the Super Sixes stage in the 2003 tournament. On 23 June 2003, he became the first Zimbabwean bowler to take 200 ODI wickets during an ODI against England.

In 2004, he was unceremoniously sacked from the team by the Zimbabwe Cricket Union when he was still the captain of the side due to being involved in rebellions, and was subsequently replaced by the then 22-year-old Tatenda Taibu as captain. In the same year, he was nominated for ICC ODI Player of the Year during the 2004 ICC Awards.

Streak was the most successful test captain of Zimbabwe with four wins and he was also the second most successful ODI captain for Zimbabwe with 18 wins.

=== Retirement ===
Streak returned to represent Zimbabwe in March 2005 after a one-year absence from international cricket. He was also part of the Africa XI team during the 2005 Afro-Asia Cup in a 3 match ODI series against Asia XI.

Streak retired from international cricket in October 2005 to become captain of Warwickshire County Cricket Club having previously played county cricket for Hampshire. He also captained his fellow exiled players from Zimbabwe in the Red Lions team, which plays charity games in England.

== Coaching career ==
In August 2009, Streak was appointed as the bowling coach of the Zimbabwe national cricket team. He was also given the responsibility of working with the young Zimbabwean fast bowlers and for franchise cricket. Fast bowlers such as Kyle Jarvis, Christopher Mpofu, Brian Vitori and Shingirai Masakadza who were groomed and nurtured under his coaching later went onto become regular features in Zimbabwe national side.

In 2010, along with his former teammate Grant Flower, Streak became a supporting coach of Zimbabwe under former English cricketer Alan Butcher. Flower and Streak became batting and bowling coaches, respectively.

In 2013, Streak's contract was not renewed for financial reasons. Zimbabwe Cricket had offered Streak a consultancy role but they could not guarantee him a set number of working days or specific pay which forced him to stay out of the preparations for the Bangladesh series. Finances permitting at his franchise in Bulawayo, the Matabeleland Tuskers, he remained coach there. He was appointed Bangladesh's bowling coach in May 2014 until 2016 for a contract of two years. In 2016, decided not to renew contract with Bangladesh Cricket Board with the intention to become coach of National Cricket Academy in Bangalore. In July 2016, he was appointed as the consultant of Uttar Pradesh Cricket Association Academy.

In October 2016, Streak was appointed head coach of the Zimbabwe national cricket team replacing Dav Whatmore. He was tasked with ensuring Zimbabwe qualify for the 2019 World Cup. However, Zimbabwe failed to qualify for the World Cup following the disappointing performance by the team at the 2018 ICC World Cup Qualifier, and Streak was forced to resign in early 2018 with the entire coaching staff was also sacked by the board. The chairman of Zimbabwe Cricket, Tavengwa Mukuhlani also accused Streak of being racist and insisted that some of his player selections during the 2018 World Cup qualifiers were influenced by this. Streak refuted the allegations and accused Zimbabwe Cricket of being unethical and corrupt.

In 2018, he was appointed as a consultant for the Scotland side for two matches in a T20I tri-series which also featured Ireland and Netherlands. He also joined Somerset in 2019 as a consultant bowling coach for a short stint. He continued on in his role as bowling coach for the Kolkata Knight Riders in the IPL. He also served as bowling coach for the Gujarat Lions franchise in the 2016 and 2017 IPL seasons.

In April 2021, Streak was banned from all cricketing activities for eight years for breaching the ICC's anti-corruption policies. Streak was found guilty of assisting a corruptor known as "Mr X" to contact players. Streak received two bitcoins (worth around US$ 35,000), and an iPhone as payment from the corruptor in 2017. He was accused of disclosing inside information (confidential information) about the franchise T20 leagues including Indian Premier League, Pakistan Super League and Afghanistan Premier League. Streak himself accepted the ban by the ICC but denied the match fixing claims against him.

Streak also founded the Heath Streak Academy (also better known as Old Mutual Heath Streak Cricket Academy Trust) in 2014 which was established for the development and growth of cricket throughout Zimbabwe. He resigned from heading the Heath Streak Academy Trust in 2021 after being banned by the ICC; the academy was later renamed as Zimbabwe Youth Cricket Academy.

== Beyond cricket ==
In 2005, he conducted an AIDS fundraiser which also included an auction of cricket memorabilia.

== Illness and death ==
On 11 May 2023, David Coltart, a Zimbabwean senator, announced that Streak was "extremely ill". Media reports stated that Streak had been diagnosed with Stage IV colon and liver cancer, and was "on his deathbed". On 3 September 2023, Streak died from cancer at his farm in Matabeleland at age 49.

== See also ==
- List of African XI ODI cricketers

Preceded by Andy Flower	Zimbabwean national cricket captain 2000/1–2001/2	Succeeded by Brian Murphy
Preceded by Alistair Campbell	Zimbabwean national cricket captain 2003–2003/4	Succeeded by Tatenda Taibu
