= Paul Strang =

Zimbabwean cricketer

Personal information
- Full name: Paul Andrew Strang
- Born: 28 July 1970 (age 56); Bulawayo, Rhodesia
- Batting: Right-handed
- Bowling: Right-arm leg break
- Role: All-rounder
- Relatives: Bryan Strang (brother)

International information
- National side: Zimbabwe
- Test debut (cap 23): 26 October 1994 v Sri Lanka
- Last Test: 14 September 2001 v South Africa
- ODI debut (cap 38): 2 December 1994 v Australia
- Last ODI: 26 November 2001 v Bangladesh

Domestic team information
- Years: Team
- 1993/94–1995/96: Mashonaland Country Districts
- 1994/95–2000/01: Mashonaland
- 1997: Kent
- 1998: Nottinghamshire
- 1999/00: CFX Academy
- 2001/02–2003/04: Manicaland

Career statistics
Competition	Test	ODI	FC	LA
Matches	24	95	107	180
Runs scored	839	1,090	3,613	1,941
Batting average	27.06	22.24	30.10	19.60
100s/50s	1/2	0/0	3/17	0/1
Top score	106*	47	154	52*
Balls bowled	5,720	4,351	21,747	8,015
Wickets	70	96	324	193
Bowling average	36.02	33.05	30.65	29.75
5 wickets in innings	4	2	17	3
10 wickets in match	1	0	3	0
Best bowling	8/109	5/21	8/109	6/32
Catches/stumpings	15/–	30/–	96/–	64/–
- Source: CricInfo, 19 August 2012

Paul Andrew Strang (born 28 July 1970) is a Zimbabwean cricket coach and former international player. A leg-spinning all-rounder, he played in 24 Test matches and 95 One Day Internationals for Zimbabwe between 1994 and 2001. He played Test cricket alongside his brother, Bryan Strang; their father, Ronald Strang, was a first-class umpire and was TV umpire for two of Zimbabwe's Test matches in 1994/5.

Strang has since moved into coaching, joining the Auckland Aces as a high performance coach in 2008, and becoming the full-time coach soon afterwards.

== Domestic career ==
He played two seasons of county cricket as an overseas player, firstly for Kent County Cricket Club in 1997 and then for Nottinghamshire in 1998.

== International career ==
Strang studied at the University of Cape Town, and toured Pakistan with the Zimbabwe side in 1993-94. He played his first Test in 1994, and became a professional cricketer in 1995. He was one of the leading wicket-takers in the 1996 Cricket World Cup in India, taking 12 wickets with a bowling average of 16, although the team was knocked out in the preliminary stage, beating Kenya (with Strang taking 5 wickets) but losing its other 4 matches.

Strang scored his only Test century in the 1st innings of the 1st Test against Pakistan at Sheikhupura in 1996–7, batting at No. 8, including a stand of 87 with his brother for the 9th wicket. He also took 5 wickets in Pakistan's 1st innings in the same match. Strang's achievement was overshadowed by a double century, 257 not out, scored by Wasim Akram, and the match was drawn.

He played in the 1999 Cricket World Cup in England, where Zimbabwe beat Kenya, India and South Africa to qualify for the "Super Six" stage. His best Test bowling figures of 8–109 came against New Zealand in the 1st innings at Bulawayo in 2000–1, although Zimbabwe lost the match by 7 wickets. His remain the best bowling figures by a Zimbabwean in an innings in Test cricket (the best match figures belong to Adam Huckle). He only played in three further Tests, with his international career curtailed in 2000 by a chronic injury to the muscles of his right hand.

== Records ==
- Strang is the only Zimbabwean Test cricketer to take ten wickets in a match and still end up on the losing side of a test match.
