= David Brain =

Zimbabwean cricketer (born 1964)

Personal information
- Full name: David Hayden Brain
- Born: 4 October 1964 (age 62); Salisbury, Southern Rhodesia
- Batting: Right-handed
- Bowling: Left-arm fast-medium
- Role: Bowler

International information
- National side: Zimbabwe (1992–1995)
- Test debut (cap 13): 7 November 1992 v New Zealand
- Last Test: 15 February 1995 v Pakistan
- ODI debut (cap 24): 25 October 1992 v India
- Last ODI: 22 October 1995 v South Africa

Career statistics
Competition	Test	ODI	FC	LA
Matches	9	23	26	34
Runs scored	115	117	534	197
Batting average	10.45	8.35	20.53	10.94
100s/50s	0/0	0/0	1/1	0/0
Top score	28	27	126	27*
Balls bowled	1,810	1,091	4,404	1,577
Wickets	30	21	74	23
Bowling average	30.50	40.42	29.66	53.04
5 wickets in innings	1	0	4	0
10 wickets in match	0	0	0	0
Best bowling	5/42	3/51	6/48	3/51
Catches/stumpings	1/–	5/–	8/–	7/–
- Source: ESPNcricinfo, 17 June 2017

David Hayden Brain (born 4 October 1964) is a former Zimbabwean cricketer who played in nine Test matches and 23 One Day Internationals from 1992 to 1995. He was born at Salisbury, then in Southern Rhodesia, in 1964.

Brain's bowling helped Zimbabwe win their first-ever match in test cricket against Pakistan in 1995, ending with a bowling record of 3-50.
