= Eddo Brandes =

Zimbabwean cricketer (born 1963)

Personal information
- Full name: Eddo André Brandes
- Born: 5 March 1963 (age 63); Port Shepstone, Natal Province, South Africa
- Batting: Right-handed
- Bowling: Right arm fast
- Role: All-Rounder, Coach

International information
- National side: Zimbabwe (1987-1999)
- Test debut (cap 2): 18 October 1992 v India
- Last Test: 8 December 1999 v Sri Lanka
- ODI debut (cap 14): 10 October 1987 v New Zealand
- Last ODI: 18 December 1999 v Sri Lanka

Domestic team information
- Years: Team
- 1994–1996: Mashonaland Country Districts
- 1996–2001: Mashonaland

Career statistics
| Competition | Test | ODI | FC | LA |
|---|---|---|---|---|
| Matches | 10 | 59 | 60 | 126 |
| Runs scored | 121 | 404 | 1,151 | 1,173 |
| Batting average | 10.08 | 13.03 | 16.68 | 16.52 |
| 100s/50s | 0/0 | 0/2 | 1/2 | 0/4 |
| Top score | 39 | 55 | 165* | 55 |
| Balls bowled | 1,996 | 2,828 | 9,437 | 6,200 |
| Wickets | 26 | 70 | 179 | 164 |
| Bowling average | 36.57 | 32.37 | 28.60 | 28.19 |
| 5 wickets in innings | 0 | 2 | 10 | 4 |
| 10 wickets in match | 0 | 0 | 1 | 0 |
| Best bowling | 3/45 | 5/28 | 7/38 | 5/28 |
| Catches/stumpings | 4/– | 11/– | 28/– | 23/– |
- Source: Cricinfo, 11 November 2009

Eddo André Brandes (born 5 March 1963) is a Zimbabwean former cricketer who played in 10 Tests and 59 ODIs from 1987 to 1999, spanning four World Cups. In the days when a number of Zimbabwean players were amateurs with other full-time professions, Brandes was a chicken farmer. Brandes was the first Zimbabwean player to take a hat-trick in the ODI format.

== Early life ==
Brandes was born on 5 March 1963, in Port Shepstone, Natal Province, South Africa. He was the son of a German father and a South African mother. He and his family moved to Rhodesia the year after he was born, and he grew up on a farming property.

== International career ==
Although selected for the 1983 Cricket World Cup squad, Brandes did not make his official One Day International debut until the 1987 Cricket World Cup in Zimbabwe's opening match against New Zealand in a close 3 run defeat at the Niaz Stadium, being run out without facing a ball, attempting a single with Iain Butchart and pulling his quadriceps muscle before he could complete the run.

Brandes first win with Zimbabwe at a World Cup came in 1992 against England at the Lavington Sports Ground in Albury, Australia. Defending 134, Brandes bowled a ten-over unbroken spell, taking four wickets for 21 runs, including England captain Graham Gooch and one-time Zimbabwe player Graeme Hick, in a famous nine-run victory. He played for Zimbabwe in a further two World Cup tournaments.

Brandes Test match debut came in 1992 against India in Harare, but his involvement was limited to two overs after injuring himself in his opening spell.

He took a hat-trick in an ODI against England in January 1997 that is still regarded as the highest by total average of the batsmen dismissed. Only two months short of his 34th birthday at the time, he remains the oldest player to have taken an ODI hat-trick.

Brandes final ODIs and Test matches were in 1999, having taken 96 wickets and scored 521 runs over his international career span.

Brandes gained fame for his noted and oft-quoted exchange with Glenn McGrath. After McGrath became frustrated at being unable to dismiss him, the bowler asked, "Why are you so fat?" to which Brandes replied, "Because every time I shag your wife, she gives me a chocolate biscuit."

In February 2020, he was named in Zimbabwe's squad for the Over-50s Cricket World Cup in South Africa. However, the tournament was cancelled during the third round of matches due to the coronavirus pandemic.

== After cricket ==
As of 2003, Brandes had moved to Australia to pursue a coaching career and was formerly coaching the Sunshine Coast Scorchers who play in the XXXX Gold Brisbane Grade Competition. As of 2009, he runs a tomato farm on the Sunshine Coast.
