= David Houghton (cricketer) =

Zimbabwean cricketer

Personal information
- Full name: David Laud Houghton
- Born: 23 June 1957 (age 69); Bulawayo, Federation of Rhodesia and Nyasaland
- Batting: Right-handed
- Bowling: Right-arm off-break
- Role: Batsman, Wicket-keeper

International information
- National side: Zimbabwe (1983–1997)
- Test debut (cap 8): 18 October 1992 v India
- Last Test: 25 September 1997 v New Zealand
- ODI debut (cap 6): 9 June 1983 v Australia
- Last ODI: 5 October 1997 v New Zealand

Domestic team information
- Years: Team
- 1992/93–1997/98: Mashonaland

Career statistics
| Competition | Test | ODI | FC | LA |
|---|---|---|---|---|
| Matches | 22 | 63 | 120 | 163 |
| Runs scored | 1,464 | 1,530 | 7,445 | 4,191 |
| Batting average | 43.05 | 26.37 | 39.39 | 29.20 |
| 100s/50s | 4/4 | 1/12 | 17/36 | 1/12 |
| Top score | 266 | 142 | 266 | 142 |
| Balls bowled | 5 | 12 | 149 | 53 |
| Wickets | 0 | 1 | 2 | 2 |
| Bowling average | – | 19.00 | 29.50 | 28.50 |
| 5 wickets in innings | – | 0 | 0 | 0 |
| 10 wickets in match | – | 0 | 0 | 0 |
| Best bowling | – | 1/19 | 2/7 | 1/9 |
| Catches/stumpings | 17/– | 29/2 | 165/16 | 112/11 |
- Source: , 2 October 2018

David Laud Houghton (born 23 June 1957) is a Zimbabwean cricket coach and former cricketer. He was the first test captain of Zimbabwe.

He captained Zimbabwe in their first four Test matches and led the team in 17 One Day Internationals (ODI). He was regarded as one of the finest batsmen to have emerged from Zimbabwe. He featured in three ICC Cricket World Cup tournaments in 1983, 1987 and 1992.

He was deemed as a loyal servant to Zimbabwe cricket according to several critics and pundits and he was also lauded for choosing country over lucrative offers.

== Early career ==
He initially joined the police force straight after leaving the school in order to make a living. However, he could not continue to serve in the police force due to change in governing policies at that time and pursued his interest in cricket in order to make money.

Houghton also represented his country in hockey and was described by the Pakistan hockey team captain Kaleemullah Khan as the best goalkeeper he had ever played against.

He made his first-class debut in November 1978. He only had two first-class centuries under his belt before turning 30 and did not get the privilege of playing test cricket until the age of 35 as Zimbabwe was still in the pre-test arena.

== International career ==
He made his One Day International (ODI) debut on 9 June 1983 against Australia at the 1983 Cricket World Cup, a match which was Zimbabwe's first ODI. The match created a massive upset as Australia were defeated by 13 runs, with Kevin Curran part of a crucial 70 run partnership for the sixth wicket with Duncan Fletcher. Coincidentally, Houghton scored a golden duck in the match without troubling the scorers as he was dismissed by Graham Yallop. He had a decent outing in his country's first ever World Cup appearance in 1983 scoring two half-centuries in six innings.

His most memorable ODI innings was against New Zealand in the 1987 Reliance World Cup, in which Houghton scored 142 runs off 137 deliveries with 13 fours and 6 sixes. This innings brought Zimbabwe to the brink of a surprise victory, but New Zealand won by only 3 runs, and is the highest score by an associate batsman against a Test playing nation, taking place as it did before Zimbabwe were granted test status. His knock of 142 is also considered as one of the best knocks in a losing cause chasing 243. His whirlwind knock of 142 along with his partnership with no 9 batsman Iain Butchart rescued Zimbabwe from a paltry position reeling at 104/7 to 240 all out and also Zimbabwe survived from a rather embarrassing crushing defeat.

He captained Zimbabwe in their inaugural test match against India on 18 October 1992 in Harare and went onto score a test century on his debut which eventually ended in a draw. He holds the rare unique distinction of being the only man to score a century on test debut as the captain of the team in his team's first ever test match appearance. He also became the first ever Zimbabwean to score a test century. He was also incidentally the then oldest player debutant to score a test century at the age or 35 years and 4 months. His record was later surpassed by Adam Voges of Australia who then went onto become the oldest ever debutant in test cricket history to score a hundred at the age of 35 years and 8 months.

He also added a crucial 165 run stand for the fifth wicket with Andy Flower which propelled Zimbabwe to put up a huge score on the board in their first innings. After scoring 121 in the first innings contributing to Zimbabwe's massive first innings total of 456, he continued his run fest in the second innings as he scored an unbeaten 41 runs in Zimbabwe's total of 156/4 before the end of fifth and final day's play.

He captained Zimbabwe side during the 1992 Cricket World Cup in his third World Cup tournament. Houghton holds the record for the highest test score by a Zimbabwean, with his 266 against Sri Lanka in 1994. He occupied the crease for about 11 hours and 90 overs in his knock of 266 against Sri Lanka.

In December 1997, he announced his retirement from all formats of the game at the age of 40 citing consistent and regular knee injuries during his latter stage of his career. Since retiring as a player, Houghton has gone on to become a coach and commentator.

== Coaching career ==
He served as the national head coach of Zimbabwe men's national cricket team during the 1990s and during his tenure as head coach, Zimbabwe reached Super Six round of the 1999 Cricket World Cup.

Before becoming the coach of Derbyshire County Cricket Club, he coached Radlett Cricket Club in Hertfordshire. Whilst in this role his best achievement was taking Radlett to victory in the Evening Standard Trophy, a knockout competition for London club sides.

He initially coached Derbyshire from 2004 until the middle of the 2007 season when he resigned. In 2009, he was appointed as director of national coaching of Zimbabwe cricket team as part of Zimbabwe Cricket’s rehabilitation efforts. He resumed the job role in August 2009 and served as technical director to national team and age group coaches.

He returned as first team batting coach of Derbyshire in 2011 and served in the relevant position until 2013. During his stint as batting coach, Derbyshire was promoted to Division One of the County Championship after winning Division Two title in 2012. He also had brief coaching stints with Somerset, Worcestershire and Middlesex.

He served Somerset in a similar role in 2014 (prior to the arrival of then director of cricket Matthew Maynard) before joining Middlesex for a four-year spell as batting coach on 10 November 2014.

He was appointed to a newly created role as Head of Cricket by Derbyshire in September 2018 which took effect in October. He replaced Kim Barnett as coach of Derbyshire in 2018 who served as consultant coach of the club before stepping down.

In September 2021, he resigned from the role of Derbyshire's head of cricket at the end of the 2021 county season which also brought an end to his third coaching spell with the club.

In October 2021, he was appointed as Zimbabwe cricket's coaching manager and he is assigned with the task of developing and implementing coaching programs across all three formats of international cricket and levels of the game in Zimbabwe. He was also appointed as the head coach of Mountaineers side for the 2021–22 season.

In June 2022, he replaced Lalchand Rajput as the national coach of Zimbabwean national cricket team and his appointment came just ahead of the 2022 ICC Men's T20 World Cup Global Qualifier B. He resigned as head coach in December 2023, following Zimbabwe's failure to qualify for the 2024 T20 World Cup.

== Records ==
- Fastest Zimbabwean test cricketer to reach 1000 test runs (24 innings).
- He along with Iain Butchart set the record for the highest 8th wicket partnership in ICC Cricket World Cup history (117)
- He still holds the Test Match record for the most runs in a career without a duck, with 1,464.

| Preceded by None | Zimbabwean national cricket captain 1992-93 | Succeeded by Andy Flower |
| Preceded by Mark Ramprakash | Middlesex batting coach 2014–2018 | Succeeded by Vacant |
| Preceded by New position | Derbyshire; Head of Cricket; 2018 to date | Succeeded by Incumbent |
