= Alistair Campbell (cricketer) =

Zimbabwean cricketer (born 1972)

Personal information
- Full name: Alistair Douglas Ross Campbell
- Born: 23 September 1972 (age 54); Salisbury, Rhodesia
- Batting: Left-handed
- Bowling: Right-arm off break
- Relatives: Johnathan Campbell (son); Donald Campbell (brother)

International information
- National side: Zimbabwe (1992–2003)
- Test debut (cap 4): 18 October 1992 v India
- Last Test: 16 November 2002 v Pakistan
- ODI debut (cap 22): 29 February 1992 v West Indies
- Last ODI: 12 March 2003 v Kenya

Career statistics
Competition	Test	ODI	FC	LA
Matches	60	188	129	248
Runs scored	2,858	5,185	6,701	7,098
Batting average	27.21	30.50	33.84	33.16
100s/50s	2/18	7/30	11/38	9/43
Top score	103	131*	196	131*
Balls bowled	66	509	1,737	842
Wickets	0	12	22	24
Bowling average	–	36.16	45.63	29.83
5 wickets in innings	–	0	0	0
10 wickets in match	–	0	0	0
Best bowling	–	2/20	4/82	3/19
Catches/stumpings	60/–	76/–	133/–	95/–
- Source: ESPNcricinfo, 10 July 2017

Alistair Douglas Ross Campbell (born 23 September 1972) is a Zimbabwean former cricketer and a former captain of the Zimbabwe national cricket team. He is also a cricket commentator. He played 60 matches in his Test career, captaining Zimbabwe on 21 occasions. He also played 188 One Day Internationals, being captain in 86 of them. He retired from cricket in 2003.

== Domestic career ==
Born in Salisbury (now Harare), Campbell started his cricketing career as early as in school times in Eaglesvale High School, and was selected for the national team while he was still at the school. He scored his maiden first-class century by becoming the youngest Zimbabwean to do so.

== International career ==
=== Early career ===
A left-handed batsman, Campbell batted in the middle order in Test cricket but usually opened in One Day International cricket. After becoming the youngest ever Zimbabwean to make a first-class century he was selected for the 1992 World Cup in Australia, aged 19. He struggled throughout but in the coming years managed to cement his spot in the national team. On the 1993–94 Pakistan tour he scored 3 half centuries against the likes of Wasim Akram and Waqar Younis.

In October 1994 he fell painfully short of his maiden Test century when he was dismissed by Sri Lankan paceman Ravindra Pushpakumara for 99. This remained his highest Test score for five years until he brought up 3 figures against India at Nagpur in 2000–01. He scored one more Test century in his career, an innings of 103 the following season against the West Indies.

He was more successful in the ODI arena, making over 5000 runs and maintaining an average of over 30. His most prolific year was in 2000 when he made 960 runs at 38.40. Of his 7 hundreds, 2 were made against Australia.

=== Captaincy ===
Campbell took over the captaincy of Zimbabwe in 1996. He led them to a series victory in Pakistan in 1998–99, and also led the team to the Super Six stage of the 1999 World Cup. After 3 years in charge he stood down from the captaincy for what he stated as 'personal reasons'.

In the 1998 inaugural ICC Knockout Trophy (now renamed as ICC Champions Trophy), Campbell became the first batsman to score a century.

=== Post captaincy ===
After not being selected for the 2003 World Cup, Campbell announced his retirement from international cricket only to reconsider when he was chosen to replace an injured Mark Vermeulen. Zimbabwe's final match of the World Cup turned out to be the final match of Campbell's career as he was never selected again for his country.

In July 2009, Campbell was re-inducted into Zimbabwe cricket after being selected chairman of their Cricket Committee, a major step in the revival of the sport in the nation. He is also the chief selector of the Zimbabwean national cricket team.

== After cricket ==
Campbell worked as a selector in the cricket administration of Zimbabwe, where he resigned from the position in October 2011. He also resigned as chair of the cricket committee in 2012.

In 2015, he was appointed as the managing director of Zimbabwe Cricket, by replacing Wilfred Mukondiwa. However, in July of the same year, Zimbabwean allrounder Prosper Utseya criticized Campbell's actions as the chairman, alleging that he was a victim of racism because of these actions. Due to these incidents, Campbell resigned from the chairman role as Zimbabwe Cricket's director of international cricket and commercial affairs on 22 October 2015.

In 2025, Campbell was interviewed by the BBC on blueberry farming in Zimbabwe, as he co-owns a high-tech 50 hectare blueberry farm near Harare.

Preceded by Andy Flower	Zimbabwean national cricket captain 1996–1999/2000	Succeeded by Andy Flower
Preceded by Stuart Carlisle	Zimbabwean national cricket captain 2002/3	Succeeded by Heath Streak
