= English cricket team in Zimbabwe in 2001–02 =

England in Zimbabwe in 2001–02
	England	Zimbabwe
- Dates: 1 October – 13 October 2001
Captains	Nasser Hussain	Guy Whittall (1st ODI); Heath Streak (2nd & 3rd ODIs); Alistair Campbell (4th & 5th ODIs)

One Day International series
- Results: England won the 5-match series 5–0
Most runs	Nick Knight (302)	Andy Flower (246)
Most wickets	Matthew Hoggard (10)	Grant Flower (6); Dougie Marillier (6)
- Player of the series: Nick Knight (Eng)

The England cricket team toured Zimbabwe from 1 October to 13 October 2001 for a five-match One Day International (ODI) series, with three matches in Harare and two in Bulawayo. England won all five matches.

== Squads ==
On 28 August 2001, England named an initial 16-man squad for the tour, including three uncapped players: wicket-keeper James Foster, and bowlers James Kirtley and Jeremy Snape. Bowler James Ormond withdrew from the squad on 15 September after suffering from patellar tendinitis in his right knee, while all-rounder Craig White also pulled out after twisting his right knee in training; they were replaced by bowler Chris Silverwood and batsman Graham Thorpe, respectively.

Zimbabwe	England
Guy Whittall (c); Gary Brent; Alistair Campbell; Stuart Carlisle; Dion Ebrahim; Sean Ervine; Andy Flower (wk); Grant Flower; Travis Friend; Douglas Hondo; Dougie Marillier; Mluleki Nkala; Henry Olonga; Heath Streak; Dirk Viljoen; Craig Wishart	Nasser Hussain (c); Paul Collingwood; Andrew Flintoff; James Foster (wk); Paul Grayson; Matthew Hoggard; Ben Hollioake; James Kirtley; Nick Knight; James Ormond†; Mark Ramprakash; Owais Shah; Ryan Sidebottom; Jeremy Snape; Marcus Trescothick; Craig White†

† – withdrew from squad

== Tour match ==
=== 50-over: Zimbabwe A vs England XI ===
1 October 2001
Scorecard

England XI; 262/8 (50 overs)	v	Zimbabwe A 124 (44.1 overs)
Graham Thorpe 95 (120); Sean Ervine 3/53 (10 overs)		Barney Rogers 30 (76); James Kirtley 3/21 (7.1 overs)

England XI won by 138 runs
Alexandra Sports Club, Harare
Umpires: Ahmed Esat (Zim) and Christian Nyazika (Zim)

- England XI won the toss and elected to bat.

== ODI series ==
=== 1st ODI ===
3 October 2001
Scorecard

Zimbabwe; 206 (49.1 overs)	v	England; 210/5 (46.4 overs)
Andy Flower 59 (78); Matthew Hoggard 2/25 (10 overs)		Nasser Hussain 73 (77); Dirk Viljoen 2/44 (10 overs)

England won by 5 wickets
Harare Sports Club, Harare
Umpires: Ian Robinson (Zim) and Russell Tiffin (Zim)
Player of the match: Jeremy Snape (Eng)

- Zimbabwe won the toss and elected to bat.
- James Foster, Matthew Hoggard, James Kirtley, Jeremy Snape (all Eng) and Douglas Hondo (Zim) made their ODI debuts.

=== 2nd ODI ===
6 October 2001
Scorecard

Zimbabwe; 195 (49.1 overs)	v	England; 196/2 (37.3 overs)
Alistair Campbell 49 (69); Matthew Hoggard 3/37 (10 overs)		Nick Knight 82* (103); Gary Brent 1/47 (10 overs)

England won by 8 wickets
Harare Sports Club, Harare
Umpires: Kevan Barbour (Zim) and Ahmed Esat (Zim)
Player of the match: Matthew Hoggard (Eng)

- Zimbabwe won the toss and elected to bat.

=== 3rd ODI ===
7 October 2001
Scorecard

Zimbabwe; 261/8 (50 overs)	v	England; 265/6 (47.3 overs)
Andy Flower 142* (128); Matthew Hoggard 5/49 (10 overs)		Mark Ramprakash 47 (60); Grant Flower 2/38 (10 overs)

England won by 4 wickets
Harare Sports Club, Harare
Umpires: Christian Nyazika (Zim) and Ian Robinson (Zim)
Player of the match: Andy Flower (Zim)

- Zimbabwe won the toss and elected to bat.
- Ryan Sidebottom (Eng) made his ODI debut.

=== 4th ODI ===
10 October 2001
Scorecard

England; 280/9 (50 overs)	v	Zimbabwe; 210 (44.3 overs)
Paul Collingwood 77 (90); Dougie Marillier 4/38 (10 overs)		Grant Flower 96 (101); Paul Grayson 3/40 (10 overs)

England won by 70 runs
Queens Sports Club, Bulawayo
Umpires: Jeff Fenwick (Zim) and Quintin Goosen (Zim)
Player of the match: Paul Collingwood (Eng)

- England won the toss and elected to bat.
- Sean Ervine (Zim) made his ODI debut.

=== 5th ODI ===
13 October 2001
Scorecard

Zimbabwe; 228 (49.3 overs)	v	England; 229/3 (43.4 overs)
Grant Flower 104 (137); Jeremy Snape 3/43 (8.3 overs)		Nick Knight 80* (119); Grant Flower 1/39 (6.4 overs)

England won by 7 wickets
Queens Sports Club, Bulawayo
Umpires: Charles Coventry (Zim) and Graeme Evans (Zim)
Player of the match: Nick Knight (Eng)

- Zimbabwe won the toss and elected to bat.
