= 2001 Zimbabwe Coca-Cola Cup =

Zimbabwe Coca-Cola Cup 2001
- Part of Indian cricket team in Zimbabwe in 2001; West Indian cricket team in Zimbabwe in 2001
- Date: 23 June – 8 July 2001
- Location: Zimbabwe
- Result: West Indies won the Coca-Cola Cup
- Player of the series: Sachin Tendulkar (Ind)
Teams
Zimbabwe	India	West Indies
Captains
Grant Flower 1st Guy Whittall 3rd ODI Heath Streak 2nd, 4th ODI	Sourav Ganguly	Carl Hooper
Most runs
Grant Flower (172)	Sachin Tendulkar (282)	Darren Ganga (228)
Most wickets
Grant Flower (6)	Zaheer Khan (9)	Mervyn Dillon (8)

The 2001 Zimbabwe Coca-Cola Cup was a One Day International (ODI) cricket tournament held in Zimbabwe in late June 2001. It was a tri-nation series between the national representative cricket teams of the Zimbabwe, India and West Indies. West Indies won the tournament by defeating India by 16 runs in the final.

== Squads ==
Zimbabwe	India	West Indies
Heath Streak (c); Guy Whittall (vc); Andy Blignaut; Alistair Campbell; Stuart Carlisle; Dion Ebrahim; ~~Andy Flower (wk)~~; Grant Flower; Travis Friend; Brian Murphy; Tatenda Taibu (wk); Mluleki Nkala; Dirk Viljoen; David Mutendera	Sourav Ganguly (c); Rahul Dravid; Sachin Tendulkar; VVS Laxman; Hemang Badani; Sameer Dighe; Debashish Mohanty; Zaheer Khan; Harbhajan Singh; Reetinder Singh Sodhi; Harvinder Singh; Ajit Agarkar; Dinesh Mongia (wk); Virender Sehwag; Ashish Nehra	Carl Hooper (c); Ridley Jacobs (wk); Chris Gayle; Daren Ganga; Brian Lara; Shivnarine Chanderpaul; Marlon Samuels; Ramnaresh Sarwan; Wavell Hinds; Cameron Cuffy; Mervyn Dillon; Reon King; Corey Collymore; Kerry Jeremy; Neil McGarrell; Mahendra Nagamootoo

Andy Flower was ruled out of the tournament with a dislocated thumb bone and was replaced with Tatenda Taibu for Zimbabwe. India's Ashish Nehra, who was to return to India following the Test series, was retained for the series.

== Fixtures ==
=== 1st ODI ===
23 June 2001
Scorecard

West Indies; 266/5 (50 overs)	v	Zimbabwe; 239/9 (50 overs)
Daren Ganga 66 (98); Brian Murphy 2/43 (9 overs)		Alistair Campbell 68 (108); Marlon Samuels 3/28 (5 overs)

West Indies won by 27 runs
Harare Sports Club, Harare
Umpires: Kevan Barbour (Zim) and Russell Tiffin (Zim)
Player of the match: Cameron Cuffy (Win)

- Zimbabwe won the toss and elected to field.
- Tatenda Taibu (Zim) made his ODI debut.
- Points: West Indies 2, Zimbabwe 0.

=== 2nd ODI ===
24 June 2001
Scorecard

Zimbabwe; 133 (41.5 overs)	v	India; 137/1 (26.2 overs)
Dion Ebrahim 32 (53); Ajit Agarkar 3/26 (9.5 overs)		Sachin Tendulkar 70* (70); Heath Streak 1/28 (6 overs)

India won by 9 wickets (with 142 balls remaining)
Harare Sports Club, Harare
Umpires: Graeme Evans (Zim) and Ian Robinson (Zim)
Player of the match: Sachin Tendulkar (Ind)

- India won the toss and elected to field.
- Ashish Nehra (Ind) made his ODI debut.
- Points: India 2, Zimbabwe 0.

=== 3rd ODI ===
27 June 2001
Scorecard

Zimbabwe; 234/6 (50 overs)	v	India; 237/6 (49.2 overs)
Guy Whittall 58* (55); Zaheer Khan 4/42 (10 overs)		Saurav Ganguly 85 (125); Grant Flower 4/44 (8 overs)

India won by 4 wickets (with 4 balls remaining)
Queens Sports Club, Bulawayo
Umpires: Ahmed Esat (Zim) and Jeff Fenwick (Zim)
Player of the match: Rahul Dravid (Ind)

- India won the toss and elected to field.
- Points: India 2, Zimbabwe 0.

=== 4th ODI ===
30 June 2001
Scorecard

West Indies; 169/7 (50 overs)	v	India; 170/4 (43.5 overs)
Ridley Jacobs 53* (76); Debashish Mohanty 3/18 (10 overs)		Sachin Tendulkar 81* (110); Wavell Hinds 1/12 (4 overs)

India won by 6 wickets (with 37 balls remaining)
Queens Sports Club, Bulawayo
Umpires: Charles Coventry (Zim) and Quintin Goosen (Zim)
Player of the match: Sachin Tendulkar (Ind)

- India won the toss and elected to field.
- Points: India 2, West Indies 0.

=== 5th ODI ===
1 July 2001
Scorecard

Zimbabwe; 255/5 (50 overs)	v	West Indies; 258/5 (49.5 overs)
Grant Flower 94 (107); Cameron Cuffy 2/30 (10 overs)		Chris Gayle 76 (95); Grant Flower 2/46 (10 overs)

West Indies won by 5 wickets (with 1 ball remaining)
Queens Sports Club, Bulawayo
Umpires: Jeff Fenwick (Zim) and Quintin Goosen (Zim)
Player of the match: Grant Flower (Zim)

- West Indies won the toss and elected to field.
- Points: West Indies 2, Zimbabwe 0.

=== 6th ODI ===
4 July 2001
Scorecard

West Indies; 229/5 (50 overs)	v	India; 230/4 (48.1 overs)
Wavell Hinds 66 (90); Harvinder Singh 2/65 (10 overs)		Sachin Tendulkar 122* (131); Carl Hooper 2/39 (10 overs)

India won by 6 wickets (with 11 balls remaining)
Harare Sports Club, Harare
Umpires: Graeme Evans (Zim) and Kevan Barbour (Zim)
Player of the match: Sachin Tendulkar (Ind)

- India won the toss and elected to field.
- Points: India 2, West Indies 0.

== Final ==
7 July 2001
Scorecard

West Indies; 290/6 (50 overs)	v	India; 274/8 (50 overs)
Darren Ganga 71 (62); Reetinder Sodhi 2/31 (7 overs)		Sameer Dighe 94* (96); Corey Collymore 4/49 (10 overs)

West Indies won by 16 runs
Harare Sports Club, Harare
Umpires: Ian Robinson (Zim) and Russell Tiffin (Zim)
Player of the match: Corey Collymore (WI)

- India won the toss and elected to field.
- Wavell Hinds (WI) passed 1,000 runs in ODIs.
- West Indies won the Coca-Cola Cup.
