= South African cricket team in Zimbabwe in 2001–02 =

South African cricket team in Zimbabwe in 2001-02
	Zimbabwe	South Africa
- Dates: 7 September 2001 – 30 September 2001
Captains	Heath Streak	Shaun Pollock

Test series
- Result: South Africa won the 2-match series 1–0
Most runs	Andy Flower (422)	Jacques Kallis (388)
Most wickets	Travis Friend (6)	Claude Henderson (11)

One Day International series
- Results: South Africa won the 3-match series 3–0
Most runs	Alistair Campbell (142)	Herschelle Gibbs (233)
Most wickets	Claude Henderson (7)	Grant Flower (3); Paul Strang (3)
- Player of the series: Herschelle Gibbs (SA)

The South African national cricket team toured Zimbabwe in September 2001 and played a two-match Test series against the Zimbabwean national cricket team. South Africa won the Test series 1–0. South Africa were captained by Shaun Pollock and Zimbabwe by Heath Streak. In addition, the teams played a three-match series of Limited Overs Internationals (LOI) which South Africa won 3–0.

== Squads ==
Tests		ODIs	
Zimbabwe	South Africa	Zimbabwe	South Africa
Heath Streak (C); Dion Ebrahim; Alistair Campbell; Hamilton Masakadza; Andy Flower (WK); Craig Wishart; Grant Flower; Guy Whittall; Paul Strang; Mushfiqur Rahim; Travis Friend; Mluleki Nkala; Raymond Price	Shaun Pollock (c); Mark Boucher (wk); Gary Kirsten; Herschelle Gibbs; Boeta Dippenaar; Jacques Kallis; Lance Klusener; Shaun Pollock; Neil McKenzie; Richmond Mutumbami; Claude Henderson; Andre Nel; Makhaya Ntini	Heath Streak (C); Dion Ebrahim; Alistair Campbell; Hamilton Masakadza; Andy Flower (WK); Craig Wishart; Grant Flower; Guy Whittall; Paul Strang; Mushfiqur Rahim; Travis Friend; Mluleki Nkala	Shaun Pollock (c); Mark Boucher (wk); Gary Kirsten; Herschelle Gibbs; Jonty Rhodes; Jacques Kallis; Lance Klusener; Shaun Pollock; Neil McKenzie; Richmond Mutumbami; Claude Henderson; Andre Nel; Makhaya Ntini

== Test Series ==
=== 1st Test ===
7–11 September
Scorecard

South Africa	v	Zimbabwe
600/3d (124 overs); Gary Kirsten 220 (286); Travis Friend 2/147 (27 overs)		286 (90.3 overs); Andy Flower 142 (200); Andre Nel 4/53 (16 overs)
79/1 (15.2 overs); Jacques Kallis 42* (55); Travis Friend 1/44 (7 overs)		391 (171.5 overs) (f/o); Andy Flower 199* (470); Shaun Pollock 3/67 (29 overs)

South Africa won by 9 wickets
Harare Sports Club, Harare
Umpires: Darrell Hair (Aus) & Russell Tiffin (Zim)
Player of the match: Andy Flower (Zim)

- South Africa won the toss and elected to bat.

=== 2nd Test ===
14–18 September
Scorecard

Zimbabwe	v	South Africa
419/9d (178 overs); Alistair Campbell 77 (243); Claude Henderson 4/143 (67 overs)		519/8d (186.2 overs); Jacques Kallis 189* (443); Raymond Price 5/181 (79 overs)
96/3 (42 overs); Hamilton Masakadza 42* (97); Claude Henderson 3/33 (18 overs)

Match drawn
Queens Sports Club, Bulawayo
Umpires: Kevan Barbour (ZIM) and John Hampshire (Eng)
Player of the match: Jacques Kallis (SA)

- Zimbabwe won the toss and elected to bat.
- Raymond Price (Zim) took five-wicket haul

== ODI series ==
=== 1st ODI ===
23 September 2001
Scorecard

South Africa; 363/3 (50 overs)	v	Zimbabwe; 210/5 (50 overs)
Herschelle Gibbs 125 (112); Paul Strang 1/56 (10 overs)		Alistair Campbell 81 (117); Andre Nel 1/27 (8 overs)

South Africa won by 153 runs
Queens Sports Club, Bulawayo
Umpires: Charles Coventry (Zim) and Jeff Fenwick (Zim)
Player of the match: Herschelle Gibbs (SA)

- South Africa won the toss and elected to bat.
- Claude Henderson (SA) and Hamilton Masakadza (Zim) both made their ODI debuts.

=== 2nd ODI ===
29 September 2001
Scorecard

South Africa; 272/7 (50 overs)	v	Zimbabwe; 124 (40.1 overs)
Herschelle Gibbs 69 (77); Grant Flower 2/21 (5 overs)		Stuart Carlisle 31 (36); Claude Henderson 4/17 (9.1 overs)

South Africa won by 148 runs
Harare Sports Club, Harare
Umpires: Quintin Goosen (Zim) and Ian Robinson (Zim)
Player of the match: Jonty Rhodes (SA)

- South Africa won the toss and elected to bat.

=== 3rd ODI ===
30 September 2001
Scorecard

Zimbabwe; 184/6 (50 overs)	v	South Africa; 188/4 (41 overs)
Stuart Carlisle 51 (100); Claude Henderson 2/34 (10 overs)		Neil McKenzie 69* (86); Mluleki Nkala 2/46 (9 overs)

South Africa won by 6 wickets
Harare Sports Club, Harare
Umpires: Ahmed Esat (Zim) and Graeme Evans (Zim)
Player of the match: Neil McKenzie (SA)

- Zimbabwe won the toss and elected to bat.
