= New Zealand cricket team in Zimbabwe in 2000–01 =

The New Zealand national cricket team visited Zimbabwe in September 2000 and played a two-match Test series against the Zimbabwean national cricket team. New Zealand won the Test series 2–0. New Zealand were captained by Stephen Fleming and Zimbabwe by Heath Streak.

== Test series ==
=== 1st Test ===
12–16 September 2000
Scorecard

Zimbabwe	v	New Zealand
350 (175.2 overs); Alistair Campbell 88 (307); Paul Wiseman 5/90 (45 overs)		338 (153.5 overs); Matt Horne 110 (277); Paul Strang 8/109 (51.5 overs)
119 (67.5 overs); Alistair Campbell 45 (133); Chris Cairns 5/31 (14.5 overs)		132/3 (45.4 overs); Mathew Sinclair 43* (119); Paul Strang 2/49 (20.4 overs)

New Zealand won by 7 wickets
Queens Sports Club, Bulawayo
Umpires: Darrell Hair (Aus) and Russell Tiffin (Zim)
Player of the match: Paul Wiseman (NZ)

- Zimbabwe won the toss and elected to bat.
- Mark Richardson (NZ) and David Mutendera (Zim) made their Test debuts.

=== 2nd Test ===
19–23 September 2000
Scorecard

New Zealand	v	Zimbabwe
465 (160.3 overs); Chris Cairns 124 (174); Henry Olonga 3/115 (27 overs)		166 (92 overs); Grant Flower 49 (237); Shayne O'Connor 3/43 (28 overs)
74/2 (15.2 overs); Mathew Sinclair 35* (44); Heath Streak 2/33 (8 overs)		370 (f/o) (178.3 overs); Guy Whittall 188* (429); Shayne O'Connor 4/73 (45 overs)

New Zealand won by 8 wickets
Harare Sports Club, Harare
Umpires: Ian Robinson (Zim) and David Shepherd (Eng)
Player of the match: Chris Cairns (NZ)

- New Zealand won the toss and elected to bat.

== One Day International (ODI) series ==
=== 1st ODI ===
27 September 2000
Scorecard

Zimbabwe; 183/8 (50 overs)	v	New Zealand; 184/3 (40.5 overs)
Andy Flower 34 (62); Nathan Astle 3/24 (10 overs)		Craig Spearman 86 (104); Bryan Strang 1/15 (7 overs)

New Zealand won by 7 wickets
Harare Sports Club, Harare
Umpires: Kevan Barbour (Zim) and Graeme Evans (Zim)
Player of the match: Nathan Astle (NZ)

- New Zealand won the toss and elected to field.
- Glen Sulzberger and Daryl Tuffey (both NZ) made their ODI debuts.

=== 2nd ODI ===
30 September 2000
Scorecard

Zimbabwe; 273/5 (50 overs)	v	New Zealand; 252 (48.5 overs)
Alistair Campbell 96 (108); Craig McMillan 2/41 (10 overs)		Roger Twose 64 (87); Dirk Viljoen 3/46 (10 overs)

Zimbabwe won by 21 runs
Queens Sports Club, Bulawayo
Umpires: Charles Coventry (Zim) and Russell Tiffin (Zim)
Player of the match: Heath Streak (Zim)

- New Zealand won the toss and elected to field.
- Travis Friend and Dougie Marillier (both Zim) made their ODI debuts.

=== 3rd ODI ===
1 October 2000
Scorecard

New Zealand; 264/8 (50 overs)	v	Zimbabwe; 268/4 (47.5 overs)
Craig McMillan 78 (77); Mluleki Nkala 2/20 (5 overs)		Alistair Campbell 99* (124); Shayne O'Connor 2/56 (8.5 overs)

Zimbabwe won by 6 wickets
Queens Sports Club, Bulawayo
Umpires: Jeff Fenwick (Zim) and Ian Robinson (Zim)
Player of the match: Alistair Campbell (Zim)

- New Zealand won the toss and elected to bat.
