= Bangladeshi cricket team in Zimbabwe in 2000–01 =

	Zimbabwe	Bangladesh
- Dates: 7 April 2001 – 30 April 2001
Captains	Heath Streak	Naimur Rahman

Test series
- Result: Zimbabwe won the 2-match series 2–0
Most runs	Guy Whittall (238)	Javed Omar (191)
Most wickets	Heath Streak (11)	Mohammad Manjural Islam (6)
- Player of the series: Heath Streak (Zim)

One Day International series
- Results: Zimbabwe won the 3-match series 3–0
Most runs	Grant Flower (174)	Javed Omar (105)
Most wickets	Andy Blignaut (6); David Mutendera (6); Bryan Strang (6)	Mohammad Manjural Islam (5)
- Player of the series: Grant Flower (Zim)

The Bangladeshi cricket team toured Zimbabwe for a two-match Test series and a three-match One Day International (ODI) series between 7 and 30 April 2001. In the one-sided tour, Zimbabwe won the Test series 2–0 and the ODI series 3–0. It was Bangladesh's inaugural overseas Test series. As of 2026, it was the only time Zimbabwe won multiple matches in a test series.

== Squads ==
Zimbabwe Test	Bangladesh Test	Zimbabwe ODI	Bangladesh ODI
Heath Streak (c); Mluleki Nkala; Andy Flower (wk); Alistair Campbell; Grant Flower; Guy Whittall; Stuart Carlisle; Andy Blignaut; Brian Murphy; Dion Ebrahim; Brighton Watambwa; Ray Price	Naimur Rahman (c); Habibul Bashar; Javed Omar; Khaled Mashud (wk); Mohammad Sharif; Aminul Islam; Akram Khan; Hasibul Hossain; Mehrab Hossain; Manjural Islam; Mushfiqur Rahman; Enamul Haque Moni; Al Sahariar	Heath Streak (c); Andy Flower (wk); Alistair Campbell; Grant Flower; Guy Whittall; Stuart Carlisle; Bryan Strang; Dirk Viljoen; Andy Blignaut; David Mutendera; Dion Ebrahim	Naimur Rahman (c); Habibul Bashar; Javed Omar; Khaled Mashud (wk); Mohammad Rafique; Mohammad Sharif; Aminul Islam; Akram Khan; Al Sahariar; Manjural Islam; Mushfiqur Rahman; Mehrab Hossain; Mohammad Ashraful

== ODI series ==
=== 1st ODI ===
7 April 2001
Scorecard

Bangladesh; 151/8 (50 overs)	v	Zimbabwe; 155/3 (43.1 overs)
Akram Khan 35 (108); Andy Blignaut 2/24 (10 overs)		Andy Flower 40* (63); Mushfiqur Rahman 1/20 (10 overs)

Zimbabwe won by 7 wickets
Harare Sports Club, Harare
Umpires: Kevan Barbour (Zim) and Graeme Evans (Zim)
Player of the match: Bryan Strang (Zim)

- Bangladesh won the toss and elected to bat.
- Dion Ebrahim (Zim) and Mohammad Sharif (Ban) made their debut.

=== 2nd ODI ===
8 April 2001
Scorecard

Zimbabwe; 230/7 (50 overs)	v	Bangladesh; 103 (30.4 overs)
Alistair Campbell 103 (145); Mohammad Manjural Islam 3/37 (10 overs)		Javed Omar 33* (86); David Mutendera 3/23 (5.4 overs)

Zimbabwe won by 127 runs
Harare Sports Club, Harare
Umpires: Ahmed Esat (Zim) and Ian Robinson (Zim)
Player of the match: Alistair Campbell (Zim)

- Bangladesh won the toss and elected to field.
- Javed Omar carries his bat.

=== 3rd ODI ===
11 April 2001
Scorecard

Zimbabwe; 308/4 (50 overs)	v	Bangladesh; 272/8 (50 overs)
Grant Flower 142* (128); Mohammad Manjural Islam 2/50 (10 overs)		Habibul Bashar 74 (91); Bryan Strang 3/56 (10 overs)

Zimbabwe won by 36 runs
Queens Sports Club, Bulawayo
Umpires: Russell Tiffin (Zim) and Charles Coventry (Zim)
Player of the match: Grant Flower (Zim)

- Zimbabwe won the toss and elected to bat.
- Mohammad Ashraful (Ban) made his debut.

== Test series ==
=== 1st Test ===
19–22 April 2001
Scorecard

Bangladesh	v	Zimbabwe
257 (91.3 overs); Aminul Islam 84 (200); Andy Blignaut 5/73 (23.3 overs)		457 (138.4 overs); Guy Whittall 119 (194); Mohammad Manjural Islam 6/81 (35 overs)
168 (58.3 overs); Javed Omar 85* (168); Andy Blignaut 3/37 (13.3 overs)

Zimbabwe won by an innings and 32 runs
Queens Sports Club, Bulawayo
Umpires: Kevan Barbour (Zim) and Rudi Koertzen (SA)
Player of the match: Javed Omar (Ban)

- Zimbabwe won the toss and elected to field.
- Dion Ebrahim, Andy Blignaut, Brighton Watambwa (Zim) and Javed Omar, Mushfiqur Rahman, Mohammad Sharif and Manjural Islam (Ban) all made their debut.
- Javed Omar carries his bat in the second innings.

=== 2nd Test ===
26–30 April 2001
Scorecard

Bangladesh	v	Zimbabwe
254 (120.5 overs); Mehrab Hossain 71 (224); Heath Streak 4/38 (30 overs)		421/9 dec (147.4 overs); Heath Streak 87 (164); Naimur Rahman 2/60 (28 overs)
266 (100 overs); Habibul Bashar 76 (132); Brighton Watambwa 4/64 (22 overs)		100/2 (24.3 overs); Guy Whittall 60 (75); Enamul Haque 1/8 (3 overs)

Zimbabwe won by 8 wickets
Harare Sports Club, Harare
Umpires: Doug Cowie (NZ), Russell Tiffin (Zim)
Player of the match: Guy Whittall (Zim)

- Zimbabwe won the toss and elected to field.
- Enamul Haque Moni (Ban) made his test debut.
