= Zimbabwean cricket team in Bangladesh in 2001–02 =

	Bangladesh	Zimbabwe
- Dates: 8 November 2001 – 25 November 2001
Captains	Naimur Rahman (Test); Khaled Mashud (ODI)	Brian Murphy (1st Test); Stuart Carlisle (2nd Test, ODIs)

Test series
- Result: Zimbabwe won the 2-match series 1–0
Most runs	Habibul Bashar (249)	Craig Wishart (208)
Most wickets	Mashrafe Mortaza (8)	Grant Flower (8)

One Day International series
- Results: Zimbabwe won the 3-match series 3–0
Most runs	Habibul Bashar (115)	Dion Ebrahim (211)
Most wickets	Heath Streak (6)	Mashrafe Mortaza (4)
- Player of the series: Dion Ebrahim (Zim)

The Zimbabwean national cricket team toured Bangladesh in November 2001 and played a two-match Test series and three One Day International (ODI) matches against the Bangladesh cricket team. Zimbabwe won the Test series 1–0. In addition, Zimbabwe won the ODI series by 3–0. It was Zimbabwe's last "away" win in a Test match for a long time, until the team beat Bangladesh in Sylhet in November 2018.

== Squads ==
Bangladesh Test	Zimbabwe Test	Bangladesh ODI	Zimbabwe ODI
Naimur Rahman (c); Habibul Bashar; Javed Omar; Mohammad Ashraful; Khaled Mahmud; Khaled Mashud (wk); Mashrafe Mortaza; Aminul Islam; Enamul Haque; Al Sahariar; Manjural Islam; Mohammad Sharif; Akram Khan	Brian Murphy (c); Stuart Carlisle (c); Andy Flower (wk); Grant Flower; Heath Streak; Henry Olonga; Craig Wishart; Travis Friend; Dougie Marillier; Dion Ebrahim; Trevor Gripper; Gary Brent	Khaled Mashud (c & wk); Habibul Bashar; Mohammad Ashraful; Khaled Mahmud; Mohammad Rafique; Mashrafe Mortaza; Tushar Imran; Mohammad Sharif; Sanwar Hossain; Al Sahariar; Fahim Muntasir; Javed Omar; Hasibul Hossain; Manjural Islam; Enamul Haque Moni	Stuart Carlisle (c); Mluleki Nkala; Gary Brent; Andy Flower (wk); Grant Flower; Heath Streak; Craig Wishart; Travis Friend; Dougie Marillier; Dion Ebrahim; Sean Ervine; Trevor Gripper; Paul Strang; Henry Olonga

== Test series ==
=== 1st Test ===
8–12 November
scorecard

Bangladesh	v	Zimbabwe
107/10 (48.2 overs); Enamul Haque 24 (54); Travis Friend 5/31 (18 overs)		431 (150 overs); Craig Wishart 94 (156); Mashrafe Mortaza 4/106 (32 overs)
125/3 (46.3 overs); Habibul Bashar 65 (144); Travis Friend 2/26 (11.4 overs)

Match Drawn.
Bangabandhu National Stadium, Dhaka
Umpires: AFM Akhtaruddin (Ban) and Mohammad Aslam (Pak)
Player of the match: Travis Friend (Zim)

- Zimbabwe won the toss and elected to field.
- Khaled Mahmud and Mashrafe Mortaza (Ban) made their test debut.

=== 2nd Test ===
15–19 November
scorecard

Bangladesh	v	Zimbabwe
251 (95.3 overs); Habibul Bashar 108 (209); Grant Flower 4/41 (15.3 overs)		542/7 (160 overs); Craig Wishart 114 (145); Mashrafe Mortaza 2/101 (28 overs)
301 (126.4 overs); Javed Omar 80 (322); Dougie Marillier 4/57 (19 overs)		11/2 (2.4 overs); Trevor Gripper 11* (6); Mashrafe Mortaza 2/10 (1.4 overs)

Zimbabwe won by 8 wickets.
MA Aziz Stadium, Chittagong
Umpires: Showkatur Rahman (Ban) and Asoka de Silva (SL)
Player of the match: Grant Flower (Zim)

- Bangladesh won the toss and elected to field.

== ODI Series ==
=== 1st ODI ===
23 November
10:00
scorecard

Bangladesh; 156 (48.4 overs)	v	Zimbabwe; 161/5 (42.2 overs)
Habibul Bashar 44 (91); Travis Friend 3/25 (9 overs)		Craig Wishart 79 (91); Mashrafe Mortaza 2/26 (8.2 overs)

Zimbabwe won by 5 wickets.
MA Aziz Stadium, Chittagong
Umpires: AFM Akhtaruddin (Ban) and Sailab Hossain (Ban)
Player of the match: Craig Wishart (Zim)

- Zimbabwe won the toss and elected to field.
- Tushar Imran, Mashrafe Mortaza and Fahim Muntasir (Ban) made their ODI debut.

=== 2nd ODI ===
25 November
10:00
scorecard

Zimbabwe; 309/6 (50 overs)	v	Bangladesh; 267/9 (50 overs)
Dion Ebrahim 121 (140); Mashrafe Mortaza 2/48 (9 overs)		Habibul Bashar 66 (95); Sean Ervine 2/39 (10 overs)

Zimbabwe won by 42 runs.
Bangabandhu National Stadium, Dhaka
Umpires: Jahangir Alam (Ban) and Showkatur Rahman (Ban)
Player of the match: Dion Ebrahim (Zim)

- Zimbabwe won the toss and elected to bat.

=== 3rd ODI ===
26 November
10:00
scorecard

Bangladesh; 215 (48.1 overs)	v	Zimbabwe; 219/3 (49.1 overs)
Al Sahariar 69 (97); Heath Streak 3/26 (9.1 overs)		Dion Ebrahim 84 (130); Enamul Haque 2/52 (10 overs)

Zimbabwe won by 7 wickets.
Bangabandhu National Stadium, Dhaka
Umpires: Jahangir Alam (Ban) and Sailab Hossain (Ban)
Player of the match: Dion Ebrahim (Zim)

- Zimbabwe won the toss and elected to bat.
