= Indian cricket team in Zimbabwe in 2001 =

India in Zimbabwe in 2001
	Zimbabwe	India
- Dates: 28 May – 7 July 2001
Captains	Heath Streak	Sourav Ganguly

Test series
- Result: 2-match series drawn 1–1
Most runs	Andy Flower (187)	Shiv Sunder Das (239)
Most wickets	Heath Streak (10)	Ashish Nehra (11)
- Player of the series: Shiv Sunder Das (Ind)

The Indian cricket team toured Zimbabwe from 28 May to 7 July 2001 and played two Test matches against Zimbabwe, with each team winning one game match. This would be Zimbabwe's only Test victory over a side other than Bangladesh until they beat Pakistan in the second Test in 2013.

India and Zimbabwe also participated in a triangular One Day International (ODI) competition with West Indies, with the latter eventually winning the competition.

== Tour matches ==
=== First-class: Zimbabwe A v Indians ===
28–30 May 2001
Scorecard

Indians	v	Zimbabwe A
336/9d (84.4 overs); Rahul Dravid 137 (134); David Mutendera 3/77 (18 overs)		175 (54.3 overs); Craig Wishart 68 (85); Harbhajan Singh 3/24 (11 overs)
150/7 (46 overs); Sachin Tendulkar 33 (30); Travis Friend 3/30 (12 overs)

Match drawn
Mutare Sports Club, Mutare
Umpires: Kevan Barbour and A Walsh

- Indians won the toss and elected to bat.
- No play was possible on day 2 due to rain.

=== First-class: CFX Academy v Indians ===
2–4 June 2001
Scorecard

CFX Academy	v	Indians
192 (74.1 overs); Gary Brent 72* (121); Harbhajan Singh 4/43 (18 overs)		447/4d (84.4 overs) (110 overs); Hemang Badani 112* (138); Leon Soma 1/38 (10 overs)
157 (53 overs); Barney Rogers 59 (83); Harbhajan Singh 6/37 (16 overs)		128/5d (35.5 overs); Sadagoppan Ramesh 52 (96); Barney Rogers 2/14 (2.5 overs)

Indians won by 226 runs
Country Club, Harare
Umpires: Christian Nyazika and Ronald Strang

- CFX Academy won the toss and elected to field.

=== List A: Zimbabwe A v Indians ===
22 June 2001
Scorecard

Zimbabwe A 103 (32.4 overs)	v	Indians; 108/0 (17 overs)
Stuart Matsikenyeri 38 (76); Hemang Badani 2/8 (4.4 overs)		Virender Sehwag 75* (52); Jonathan Dakin 1/27 (6 overs)

Indians won by 10 wickets
Sunrise Sports Club, Harare
Umpires: Ahmed Esat and D Kalan

- Indians won the toss and elected to field.

== Test matches ==
=== 1st Test ===
7–10 June 2001
Scorecard

Zimbabwe	v	India
173 (58.5 overs); Andy Flower 51 (45); Ashish Nehra 3/23 (12 overs)		318 (89.5 overs); Sachin Tendulkar 74 (128); Heath Streak 3/63 (24 overs)
328 (125.5 overs); Andy Flower 83 (145); Javagal Srinath 3/71 (32.2 overs)		184/2 (53.4 overs); Shiv Sunder Das 82* (183); Grant Flower 1/23 (8 overs)

India won by 8 wickets
Queens Sports Club, Bulawayo
Umpires: Daryl Harper (Aus) and Russell Tiffin (Zim)
Player of the match: Shiv Sunder Das (Ind)

- Zimbabwe won the toss and decided to bat.
- This was India's first Test win outside Asia in 15 years.

=== 2nd Test ===
15–18 June 2001
Scorecard

India	v	Zimbabwe
237 (74.2 overs); Rahul Dravid 68 (115); Heath Streak 3/69 (20 overs)		315 (107.3 overs); Grant Flower 86 (244); Harbhajan Singh 4/71 (26 overs)
234 (98.5 overs); Shiv Sunder Das 70 (245); Andy Blignaut 5/74 (31.5 overs)		157/6 (54 overs); Stuart Carlisle 62 (137); Ashish Nehra 2/45 (13 overs)

Zimbabwe won by 4 wickets
Harare Sports Club, Harare
Umpires: Asoka de Silva (SL) and Ian Robinson (Eng)
Player of the match: Andy Blignaut (Zim)

- India won the toss and elected to bat.
- Hemang Badani (Ind) and Travis Friend (Zim) made their Test debuts.
- Grant Flower (Zim) played his 50th Test.
- Andy Flower (Zim) equalled the Everton Weekes' record for fastest to complete 1,000 runs against India in terms of number of Tests played (7).
- Heath Streak (Zim) passed 1,000 runs in Tests, and became the first Zimbabwe player to complete the double of 1,000 runs and 100 wickets.

== Coca-Cola Cup ==
The Coca-Cola Cup was a One Day International (ODI) tournament that followed the Test series. West Indies were the third team that competed in addition to Zimbabwe and India. After six games between the three sides in the round-robin group stage, West Indies and India qualified for the final. West Indies defeated India by 16 runs in the final.
