= 1994–95 Logan Cup =

- Administrator: Zimbabwe Cricket
- Cricket format: First-class cricket (3 days)
- Tournament format(s): League system and Final
- Champions: Mashonaland (1st title)
- Participants: 4
- Matches: 7
- Most runs: 368 – Grant Flower (Mashonaland Under-24s)
- Most wickets: 19 – Malcolm Jarvis (Mashonaland)

The 1994–95 Logan Cup, known as the Lonrho Logan Cup for sponsorship reasons, was a first-class cricket competition held in Zimbabwe from 16 September 1994 – 26 March 1995. It was won by Mashonaland, who beat Mashonaland Under-24s in the final having finished top in the league stage of the competition.

== Points table ==
Team	Pld	W	L	A	Bat	Bwl	Adj	Pts
Mashonaland	3	2	0	1	14	20	–0.6	53.4
Mashonaland Under-24s	3	2	0	1	12	17	–1.7	47.3
Matabeleland	3	1	2	0	17	20	–0.9	46.1
Mashonaland Country Districts	3	0	3	0	18.5	23.5	0	42
Source:CricketArchive

== Final ==
24–26 March 1995
Scorecard

Mashonaland	v	Mashonaland Under-24s
258 (86.4 overs); Gary Martin 117; Grant Flower 3/24 (12 overs)		157 (87.1 overs); Dirk Viljoen 39*; Malcolm Jarvis 3/37 (29 overs)
347/6d (85.1 overs); Ali Shah 200*; Grant Flower 2/45 (20 overs)		283 (82 overs); Grant Flower 145*; Gary Martin 4/66 (20 overs)

Mashonaland won by 165 runs
Harare Sports Club, Harare
Umpires: Ian Robinson and Ron Strang

- Mashonaland won the toss and elected to bat.
