= 2000 KnockOut Trophy =

Cricket tournament held in Kenya

ICC KnockOut Trophy 2000
- Dates: 3 October – 15 October
- Administrator: International Cricket Council
- Cricket format: One Day International
- Tournament format: Knockout
- Host: Kenya
- Champions: New Zealand (1st title)
- Runners-up: India
- Participants: 11
- Matches: 10
- Most runs: (India) Sourav Ganguly (348)
- Most wickets: (India) Venkatesh Prasad (8)

The 2000 ICC KnockOut Trophy was the second edition of the One Day International cricket tournament. Later renamed as ICC Champions Trophy, it was held in Kenya (which helped to increase the popularity of cricket in Kenya). New Zealand were crowned champions and cashed the winner's cheque of US$250,000 with defeating India in the finals. It was their first win in a major ICC tournament. Zaheer Khan, Yuvraj Singh and Marlon Samuels made their ODI debuts during the competition.

All the test playing nations participated in the tournament along with the leading Associates Bangladesh and hosts Kenya. As there were 11 teams taking part, three would miss out on a spot in the quarter-finals. Therefore, a playoff stage took place between six of the lowest ranked teams.

== Squads ==
Australia	England	India	New Zealand
Steve Waugh (c); Adam Gilchrist (wk); Michael Bevan; Jason Gillespie; Ian Harvey; Mark Higgs; Brett Lee; Shane Lee; Damien Martyn; Glenn McGrath; Ricky Ponting; Andrew Symonds; Mark Waugh; Bradley Young; Coach: John Buchanan	Nasser Hussain (c); Mark Alleyne; Andy Caddick; Mark Ealham; Andrew Flintoff; Ashley Giles; Paul Grayson; Darren Gough; Matthew Hoggard; Graeme Hick; Vikram Solanki; Alec Stewart (wk); Marcus Trescothick; Graham Thorpe; Coach: Duncan Fletcher	Sourav Ganguly (c); Sachin Tendulkar; Ajit Agarkar; Hemang Badani; Rahul Dravid; Vinod Kambli; Anil Kumble; Sunil Joshi; Robin Singh; Yuvraj Singh; Sridharan Sriram; Venkatesh Prasad; Vijay Dahiya (wk); Zaheer Khan; Coach: Anshuman Gaekwad	Stephen Fleming (c); Geoff Allott; Nathan Astle; Chris Cairns; Chris Harris; Craig McMillan; Dion Nash; Chris Nevin; Adam Parore (wk); Craig Spearman; Scott Styris; Glen Sulzberger; Roger Twose; Paul Wiseman; Coach: David Trist
Pakistan	South Africa	Sri Lanka	Zimbabwe
Moin Khan (c / wk); Inzamam-ul-Haq; Abdul Razzaq; Arshad Khan; Azhar Mahmood; Faisal Iqbal; Ijaz Ahmed; Imran Nazir; Saeed Anwar; Saleem Elahi; Saqlain Mushtaq; Waqar Younis; Wasim Akram; Yousuf Youhana; Coach: Javed Miandad	Shaun Pollock (c); Mark Boucher (wk); Shafiek Abrahams; Nicky Boje; Allan Donald; Boeta Dippenaar; Andrew Hall; Jacques Kallis; Gary Kirsten; Lance Klusener; Neil McKenzie; Makhaya Ntini; Jonty Rhodes; Roger Telemachus; Coach: Graham Ford	Sanath Jayasuriya (c); Marvan Atapattu; Russel Arnold; Upul Chandana; Kumar Dharmasena; Avishka Gunawardene; Mahela Jayawardene; R.Kaluwitharana (wk)); Muttiah Muralitharan; Kumar Sangakkara; Eric Upashantha; Chaminda Vaas; P.Wickramasinghe; Nuwan Zoysa; Coach: Dav Whatmore	Heath Streak (c); Guy Whittall; Alistair Campbell; Stuart Carlisle; Andrew Flower (wk)); Grant Flower; Pommie Mbangwa; Mluleki Nkala; Henry Olonga; Gavin Rennie; Paul Strang; Mark Vermeulen; Dirk Viljoen; Craig Wishart; Coach: Carl Rackemann

== Pre-quarter-finals ==
3 October 2000
Scorecard

Kenya; 208/9 (50 overs)	v	India; 209/2 (42.3 overs)
Ravi Shah 60 (93); Zaheer Khan 3/48 (10 overs)		Rahul Dravid 68 (87); Maurice Odumbe 1/18 (4 overs)

India won by 8 wickets
Gymkhana Club Ground, Nairobi, Kenya
Umpires: Steve Bucknor (WI) and Dave Orchard (SA)
Player of the match: Anil Kumble (Ind)

- India won the toss and elected to field.
- India advanced to the quarter-finals.
- Vijay Dahiya, Zaheer Khan and Yuvraj Singh (Ind) all made their ODI debuts.

4 October 2000
Scorecard

Sri Lanka; 287/6 (50 overs)	v	West Indies; 179 (46.4 overs)
Avishka Gunawardene 132 (146); Mervyn Dillon 2/46 (10 overs)		Laurie Williams 41 (59); Nuwan Zoysa 3/34 (7 overs)

Sri Lanka won by 108 runs
Gymkhana Club Ground, Nairobi, Kenya
Umpires: Srinivasaraghavan Venkataraghavan (Ind) and Peter Willey (Eng)
Player of the match: Avishka Gunawardene (SL)

- West Indies won the toss and elected to field.
- Sri Lanka advanced to the quarter-finals.
- Kerry Jeremy and Marlon Samuels (WI) both made their ODI debuts.

5 October 2000
Scorecard

Bangladesh; 232/8 (50 overs)	v	England; 236/2 (43.5 overs)
Javed Omar 63 (84); Mark Ealham 3/48 (10 overs)		Nasser Hussain 95 (120); Mohammad Rafique 1/43 (10 overs)

England won by 8 wickets
Gymkhana Club Ground, Nairobi, Kenya
Umpires: Darrell Hair (Aus) and Dave Orchard (SA)
Player of the match: Alec Stewart (Eng)

- Bangladesh won the toss and elected to bat.
- England advanced to the quarter-finals.

== Knockout stage ==
The knockout stage of the 2000 ICC KnockOut Trophy, following the pre-quarter-finals, was held from 7 to 15 October 2000. The top 5 teams ranked according to 1999 Cricket World Cup seedings qualify for the knockout stage automatically. The remaining three teams qualify from the pre-quarter-finals, which was held from 3 to 5 October, between 6 of the lowest ranked teams according to 1999 Cricket World Cup seedings.

Of the eight teams entering the stage, the team which was ranked 1st according to 1999 Cricket World Cup seedings play the winner of pre-quarter-final 1 while the team which was ranked 2nd according to 1999 Cricket World Cup seedings play the winner of pre-quarter-final 2 and so on, in the format R1 v PQF 1, R2 v PQF 2, R3 v PQF 3 and R4 v R5.

Australia, Pakistan, South Africa, New Zealand and Zimbabwe qualify for the knockout stage automatically, while India, Sri Lanka and England qualify from the pre-quarter-finals by beating Kenya, West Indies and Bangladesh respectively.

India, Pakistan, New Zealand and South Africa qualified for the semi-finals by beating Australia, Sri Lanka, Zimbabwe and England respectively. In the semi-finals, New Zealand beat Pakistan and India beat South Africa to qualify for the Finals.

Quarter-finals
8 October – Nairobi, Kenya
Sri Lanka	194
Pakistan	195/1
9 October – Nairobi, Kenya
New Zealand	265/7
Zimbabwe	201
7 October – Nairobi, Kenya
India	265/9
Australia	245
10 October – Nairobi, Kenya
England	182
South Africa	184/2

Semi-finals
11 October – Nairobi, Kenya
Pakistan	252
New Zealand	255/6
13 October – Nairobi, Kenya
India	295/6
South Africa	200

Final
15 October – Nairobi, Kenya
New Zealand	265/6
India	264/6

=== Quarter-finals ===
==== Australia v India ====
7 October 2000
Scorecard

India; 265/9 (50 overs)	v	Australia; 245 (46.4 overs)
Yuvraj Singh 84 (80); Shane Lee 2/31 (10 overs)		Ricky Ponting 46 (59); Zaheer Khan 2/40 (10 overs)

India won by 20 runs
Gymkhana Club Ground, Nairobi, Kenya
Umpires: Steve Bucknor (WI) and David Shepherd (Eng)
Player of the match: Yuvraj Singh (Ind)

- Australia won the toss and elected to field.
- India advanced to the semi-finals.

==== Pakistan v Sri Lanka ====
8 October 2000
Scorecard

Sri Lanka; 194 (45.4 overs)	v	Pakistan; 195/1 (43.2 overs)
Sanath Jayasuriya 39 (41); Wasim Akram 3/40 (7.4 overs)		Saeed Anwar 105 (134)

Pakistan won by 9 wickets
Gymkhana Club Ground, Nairobi, Kenya
Umpires: Dave Orchard (SA) and Peter Willey (Eng)
Player of the match: Saeed Anwar (Pak)

- Sri Lanka won the toss and elected to bat.
- Pakistan advanced to the semi-finals.

==== New Zealand v Zimbabwe ====
9 October 2000
Scorecard

New Zealand; 265/7 (50 overs)	v	Zimbabwe; 201 (42.2 overs)
Roger Twose 85 (111); Henry Olonga 3/58 (9 overs)		Stuart Carlisle 67 (92); Paul Wiseman 4/45 (9.2 overs)

New Zealand won by 64 runs
Gymkhana Club Ground, Nairobi, Kenya
Umpires: Steve Bucknor (WI) and David Shepherd (Eng)
Player of the match: Roger Twose (NZ)

- Zimbabwe won the toss and elected to field.
- New Zealand advanced to the semi-finals.

==== South Africa v England ====
10 October 2000
Scorecard

England; 182 (44.1 overs)	v	South Africa; 184/2 (39.1 overs)
Graeme Hick 65 (68); Shaun Pollock 3/27 (9.1 overs)		Jacques Kallis 78 (110); Craig White 1/40 (8.1 overs)

South Africa won by 8 wickets
Gymkhana Club Ground, Nairobi, Kenya
Umpires: Darrell Hair (Aus) and Srinivasaraghavan Venkataraghavan (Ind)
Player of the match: Jacques Kallis (SA)

- England won the toss and elected to bat.
- South Africa advanced to the semi-finals.
- Paul Grayson (Eng) made his ODI debut.

=== Semi-finals ===
==== New Zealand v Pakistan ====
11 October 2000
Scorecard

Pakistan; 252 (49.2 overs)	v	New Zealand; 255/6 (49 overs)
Saeed Anwar 104 (115); Shayne O'Connor 5/46 (9.2 overs)		Roger Twose 87 (101); Azhar Mahmood 4/65 (10 overs)

New Zealand won by 4 wickets
Gymkhana Club Ground, Nairobi, Kenya
Umpires: Dave Orchard (SA) and David Shepherd (Eng)
Player of the match: Shayne O'Connor (NZ)

- Pakistan won the toss and elected to bat.
- New Zealand advanced to the final.

==== India v South Africa ====
13 October 2000
Scorecard

India; 295/6 (50 overs)	v	South Africa; 200 (41 overs)
Sourav Ganguly 141* (142); Allan Donald 2/34 (10 overs)		Mark Boucher 60 (77); Zaheer Khan 2/27 (5 overs)

India won by 95 runs
Gymkhana Club Ground, Nairobi, Kenya
Umpires: Steve Bucknor (WI) and Peter Willey (Eng)
Player of the match: Sourav Ganguly (Ind)

- India won the toss and elected to bat.
- India advanced to the final.

== Final ==
The final of the 2000 ICC KnockOut Trophy took place on 15 October 2000 at the Gymkhana Club Ground in Nairobi, Kenya. It was played between India and New Zealand. New Zealand won the final by four wickets to win their first ICC KnockOut Trophy, their first win at an ICC event.

=== Details ===
New Zealand won the toss and elected to field. Indian openers gave a superb start to their team, and put a brilliant partnership of 141 and scoring the runs at the run rate of over 5 runs per over, but then, their middle could not take any advantage of the start given by their openers and finished the innings scoring 264 runs and losing 6 wickets in their allotted 50 overs. Sourav Ganguly's golden run in the tournament continued as he yet again scored a brilliant century scoring 117 runs from 130 balls. New Zealand innings yet again did not start well as they lost their 2 wickets inside 6 overs for the score of 37, and later reduced to 132/5 but then, Chris Cairns and Chris Harris put a brilliant partnership of 122 runs which help them to win their first major ICC event and also their first ICC KnockOut Trophy title.

15 October 2000
Scorecard

India; 264/6 (50 overs)	v	New Zealand; 265/6 (49.4 overs)
Sourav Ganguly 117 (130); Scott Styris 2/53 (10 overs)		Chris Cairns 102* (113); Venkatesh Prasad 3/27 (7 overs)

New Zealand won by 4 wickets
Gymkhana Club Ground, Nairobi
Umpires: Steve Bucknor (WI) and David Shepherd (Eng)
Player of the match: Chris Cairns (NZ)

- New Zealand won the toss and elected to field.
- New Zealand won the 2000 ICC Knockout Trophy.
