= List of international cricket centuries by Nathan Astle =

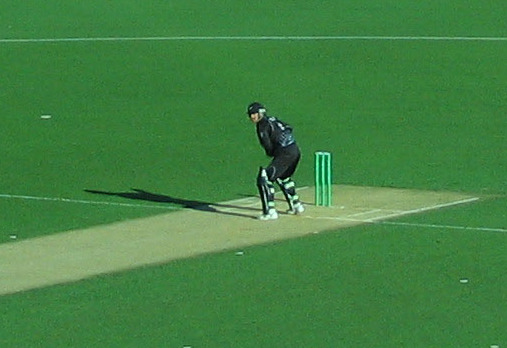
Astle batting against Australia during the first match of the 2005–06 Chappell–Hadlee Trophy.

Nathan Astle is a former international cricketer who represented the New Zealand cricket team between 1995 and 2007. He scored centuries (100 or more runs in a single innings) in Test cricket and One Day International (ODI) matches on 11 and 16 occasions, respectively. (Note: His 27 centuries are the third-highest by a New Zealander in international cricket.) Described by BBC Sport as "one of the best one-day batsmen New Zealand has ever produced", Astle is the fourth-highest run-scorer for his country in international cricket.

Astle made his ODI debut against the West Indies at Eden Park, Auckland, in January 1995. His first century came the same year against India at the Vidharba Cricket Association Ground, Nagpur. Opening the batting, he made 114 runs from 128 balls in the match which New Zealand won. He scored a century against England in the 1996 Cricket World Cup. Astle's match-winning innings of 119 against Pakistan was included among the 100 best ODI innings of all time by Wisden in 2002. He scored his second World Cup century when he made 102 against Zimbabwe in the 2003 tournament. His highest score of 145 not out was made against the United States in the 2004 Champions Trophy. In ODIs, Astle scored the most (five) centuries against India. He ended up in the nineties on nine occasions, (Note: He is next only to Sachin Tendulkar and joint second with Grant Flower and Aravinda de Silva in the list of players who ended up in the nineties.) including twice where he remained not out.

Astle made his Test debut against Zimbabwe in 1996, a year after he started playing international cricket. The same year he was picked up for the West Indies tour in which he scored back-to-back hundreds. His highest score of 222 (off 168 balls) was made against England at the Jade Stadium, Christchurch, in 2002. In the course of the innings, he set two records—fastest double-century scored in Test cricket, (Note: He reached his double-century in 153 balls and it is the fastest double-century in terms of number of balls faced.) and the second-highest individual score in the fourth innings of a Test match. (Note: George Headley holds the record for the highest total with 223 runs which was scored in a timeless Test.) Astle played four Twenty20 International matches between 2005 and 2006 without scoring a century. His highest score in the format was 40 not out.

== Key ==
Symbol	Meaning
*	Remained not out
†	Man of the match
Balls	Balls faced
Pos.	Position in the batting order
Inn.	The innings of the match
S/R	Strike rate during the innings
H/A/N	Venue was at home (New Zealand), away or neutral
Date	Match starting day
Lost	The match was lost by New Zealand
Won	The match was won by New Zealand
Drawn	The match was drawn

== ODI cricket centuries ==
List of ODI centuries scored by Nathan Astle
No.	Score	Balls	Against	Pos.	Inn.	S/R	Venue	H/A/N	Date	Result	Ref
1	114 †	128	India	2	1	89.06	Vidharba Cricket Association Ground, Nagpur	Away	26 November 1995	Won	
2	120 †	137	Zimbabwe	2	1	87.59	Eden Park, Auckland	Home	28 January 1996	Won	
3	101 †	132	England	2	1	76.51	Sardar Patel Stadium, Ahmedabad	Neutral	14 February 1996	Won	
4	117 †	132	Pakistan	2	1	88.63	Punjab Cricket Association Stadium, Mohali	Neutral	9 May 1997	Won	
5	104* †	137	Zimbabwe	2	2	75.91	McLean Park, Napier	Home	6 March 1998	Won	
6	100* †	126	South Africa	2	2	79.36	Eden Park, Auckland	Home	20 February 1999	Won	
7	120 †	136	India	2	1	88.23	Madhavrao Scindia Cricket Ground, Rajkot	Away	5 November 1999	Won	
8	104	128	Australia	1	1	81.25	McLean Park, Napier	Home	1 March 2000	Lost	
9	119 †	116	Pakistan	2	2	102.58	Carisbrook, Dunedin	Home	28 February 2001	Won	
10	117 †	150	India	2	1	78.00	R. Premadasa Stadium, Colombo	Neutral	20 July 2001	Won	
11	108	143	India	2	1	75.52	Sinhalese Sports Club Ground, Colombo	Neutral	2 August 2001	Lost	
12	122* †	150	England	2	2	81.33	Carisbrook, Dunedin	Home	26 February 2002	Won	
13	102* †	122	Zimbabwe	3	2	83.60	Chevrolet Park, Bloemfontein	Neutral	8 March 2003	Won	
14	145* †	151	USA	2	1	96.02	Kennington Oval, London	Neutral	10 September 2004	Won	
15	115* †	131	India	2	2	87.78	Harare Sports Club, Harare	Neutral	6 September 2005	Won	
16	118* †	126	West Indies	3	1	93.65	Jade Stadium, Christchurch	Home	25 February 2006	Won	

== Test cricket centuries ==
List of Test centuries scored by Nathan Astle
No.	Score	Against	Pos.	Inn.	Test	Venue	H/A/N	Date	Result	Ref
1	125	West Indies	4	3	1/2	Kensington Oval, Bridgetown	Away	19 April 1996	Lost	
2	103	West Indies	5	2	2/2	Antigua Recreation Ground, St John's, Antigua	Away	27 April 1996	Drawn	
3	102* †	England	6	3	1/3	Eden Park, Auckland	Home	24 January 1997	Drawn	
4	114	Zimbabwe	5	2	2/2	Eden Park, Auckland	Home	26 February 1998	Won	
5	101	England	4	2	3/4	Old Trafford Cricket Ground, Manchester	Away	5 August 1999	Drawn	
6	141	Zimbabwe	5	1	1/1	Basin Reserve, Wellington	Home	26 December 2000	Drawn	
7	156*	Australia	5	1	3/3	WACA Ground, Perth	Away	30 November 2001	Drawn	
8	222	England	5	4	1/3	Jade Stadium, Christchurch	Home	13 March 2002	Lost	
9	103	India	5	2	1/2	Sardar Patel Stadium, Ahmedabad	Away	8 October 2003	Drawn	
10	114	Sri Lanka	5	1	1/2	McLean Park, Napier	Home	4 April 2005	Drawn	
11	128	Zimbabwe	5	2	2/2	Queens Sports Club, Bulawayo	Away	15 August 2005	Won	

== Notes and references ==
Notes
