= List of Mashonaland first-class cricketers =

This is a list of players who have played first-class cricket for Mashonaland, a Zimbabwean cricket team. Mashonaland are currently defunct after the first re-organisation of Zimbabwean domestic cricket for the 2006–07 season.

== List of players ==
Key

played international cricket
* captained the team in at least one match
† played as wicket-keeper for at least one match

№	Name	Nationality	First	Last	Mat	Runs	HS	Avg	100	50	Wkt	BB	Ave	5wi	10wm	C	St	Ref
№	Name	Nationality	First	Last	Mat	Batting					Bowling					Fielding		Ref
1	Steve James	England	1993–94	1993–94	3	64	18	12.80	0	0	0	0/3	–	0	0	1	0	
2	Paul Bourdillon	Zimbabwe	1993–94	1993–94	2	12	10	4.00	0	0	–	–	–	–	–	2	0	
3	Justin Inglis	England	1993–94	1993–94	2	39	36	13.00	0	0	0	0/11	–	0	0	2	0	
4	Andy Flower *†	Zimbabwe (Note: born in South Africa.)	1993–94	2002–03	23	1839	201	76.62	8	7	3	1/1	57.00	0	0	38	2	
5	Dave Houghton	Zimbabwe	1993–94	1997–98	10	853	160	65.61	3	4	2	2/7	8.50	0	0	8	0	
6	Gary Martin	Zimbabwe	1993–94	1997–98	12	612	117	36.00	2	2	32	4/66	26.12	0	0	8	0	
7	Trevor Stead	Zimbabwe	1993–94	1993–94	3	42	16	10.50	0	0	2	2/37	23.00	0	0	0	0	
8	Kevin Murphy †	Zimbabwe (Note: born in Northern Rhodesia (now Zambia).)	1993–94	1993–94	1	0	0	0.00	0	0	–	–	–	–	–	3	0	
9	Ujesh Ranchod	Zimbabwe	1993–94	1997–98	10	127	43	15.87	0	0	20	3/34	31.35	0	0	7	0	
10	Malcolm Jarvis	Zimbabwe	1993–94	1994–95	7	44	24*	7.33	0	0	30	7/36	24.00	1	1	4	0	
11	Kevin Duers	Zimbabwe	1993–94	1993–94	1	0	0	0.00	0	0	3	2/43	23.33	0	0	1	0	
12	Trevor Penney	England (Note: born in Rhodesia (now Zimbabwe))	1993–94	2000–01	4	43	36	10.75	0	0	5	3/18	15.20	0	0	4	0	
13	Mark Burmester	Zimbabwe	1993–94	1994–95	4	226	60	32.28	0	3	3	2/20	18.66	0	0	2	0	
14	David Brain	Zimbabwe	1993–94	1995–96	5	174	126	34.80	1	0	19	6/61	23.52	2	0	2	0	
15	Ali Shah	Zimbabwe	1993–94	1995–96	4	267	200*	53.40	1	0	9	2/40	29.00	0	0	5	0	
16	Darrell Goodwin	Zimbabwe	1994–95	1994–95	2	70	45*	23.33	0	0	–	–	–	–	–	1	0	
17	Paul Mitchell	Zimbabwe	1994–95	1994–95	1	38	25	19.00	0	0	–	–	–	–	–	1	0	
18	Craig Evans	Zimbabwe	1994–95	2003–04	30	2073	228*	49.35	7	6	26	6/37	25.30	1	0	26	0	
19	Hitesh Hira	Zimbabwe	1994–95	1994–95	1	–	–	–	–	–	3	3/24	17.00	0	0	0	0	
20	Grant Flower	Zimbabwe	1994–95	2003–04	21	1461	243*	54.11	4	7	42	6/53	19.92	2	0	28	0	
21	Alistair Campbell	Zimbabwe	1994–95	2000–01	12	444	76	29.60	0	4	4	1/3	49.50	0	0	22	0	
22	Daniel Erasmus	Zimbabwe	1994–95	1994–95	1	34	34	17.00	0	0	–	–	–	–	–	1	0	
23	Craig Wishart	Zimbabwe	1994–95	1998–99	10	562	144	51.09	2	2	2	2/30	15.00	0	0	5	0	
24	Donald Campbell †	Zimbabwe	1994–95	2001–02	18	663	79	33.15	0	5	0	0/6	–	0	0	39	4	
25	Paul Strang	Zimbabwe	1994–95	2000–01	12	303	103*	51.09	1	1	51	5/45	23.15	3	1	7	0	
26	John Traicos	Zimbabwe (Note: Traicos was born in Egypt to Greek parents and played Test cricket for South Africa in 1970 before making his debut for Zimbabwe in 1992.)	1994–95	1994–95	1	8	8	4.00	0	0	0	0/119	–	0	0	0	0	

== Captains ==
Name	Nationality	First	Last	P	W	L	D	T	N/R	W%
Andy Flower	Zimbabwe (Note: born in South Africa.)	1993–94	1994–95	4	1	1	2	0	0	25.00
Alistair Campbell	Zimbabwe	1994–95	1994–95	1	0	1	0	0	0	0.00
