= 1995–96 Logan Cup =

- Administrator(s): Zimbabwe Cricket
- Cricket format: First-class cricket (3 days)
- Tournament format(s): League system and Final
- Champions: Matabeleland (1st title)
- Participants: 4
- Matches: 7
- Most runs: 348 – David Houghton (Mashonaland)
- Most wickets: 25 – Bryan Strang (Mashonaland Country Districts)

The 1995–96 Logan Cup, known as the Lonrho Logan Cup for sponsorship reasons, was a first-class cricket competition held in Zimbabwe from 15 September 1995 – 21 April 1996. It was won by Matabeleland, who beat Mashonaland Country Districts in the final having finished second behind them in the league stage of the competition. In the first innings of the final, Wayne James of Matabeleland, equaled the record of most dismissals in an innings by a wicket-keeper, with nine. He went on to take four more dismissals in the second innings, breaking the record for most dismissals in a match.

== Points table ==
Team	Pld	W	L	LWF	DWF	DLF	Bat	Bwl	Adj	Pts
Mashonaland Country Districts	3	2	0	1	0	0	23.5	30	–0.5	75
Matabeleland	3	2	0	0	1	0	26	26	–1.6	72.4
Mashonaland	3	1	2	0	0	0	19.5	27.5	–0.8	56.2
Young Mashonaland	3	0	2	0	0	1	18	16.5	0	34.5
Source:CricketArchive

== Final ==
19–21 April 1996
Scorecard

Mashonaland Country Districts	v	Matabeleland
265 (85 overs); Jason Oates 115; Darshan Vaghmaria 4/108 (25 overs)		220 (82.1 overs); Wayne James 99; Bryan Strang 4/69 (26 overs)
128 (39.3 overs); Donald Campbell 35; John Rennie 6/42 (19.3 overs)		176/4 (44.2 overs); Wayne James 99*; Trevor Stead 2/19 (8 overs)

Matabeleland won by 6 wickets
Bulawayo Athletic Club, Bulawayo
Umpires: Graeme Evans and Jeff Fenwick

- Mashonaland Country Districts won the toss and elected to bat.
