= Ethan Dube =

Zimbabwean cricketer

Personal information
- Full name: Langalibalele Ethan Dube
- Born: 7 September 1970 (age 55); Filabusi, Matabeleland, Rhodesia
- Batting: Right-handed
- Bowling: Right-arm fast-medium

Domestic team information
- Years: Team
- 1994–1996: Matabeleland
- Source: CricketArchive, 6 April 2016

Langalibalele Ethan Dube (born 7 September 1970) is a former Zimbabwean cricketer who represented Matabeleland in Zimbabwean domestic cricket. He played as a right-arm fast bowler, but had his career cut short by knee and back injuries. After his retirement, Dube moved into sports administration, serving as chairman of the Matabeleland Cricket Association, as a selector for the Zimbabwean national team, and as a member of the government's Sports and Recreation Commission.

== Playing career ==
Dube was born in Filabusi, in present-day Matabeleland South Province. He was raised in Bulawayo and attended Falcon College, taking up cricket at the age of 10, at a time when there were few black players. When he began playing club cricket at the age of 16 he was the only black player in his team. Having earlier toured New Zealand with a Zimbabwe Schools team, Dube was one of four Zimbabweans selected to play for an ICC Associates XI at the 1988 Youth World Cup in Australia (the others being Trevor Penney, Glen Bruk-Jackson, and Eboo Essop-Adam). He appeared in five out of his team's seven matches, and took four wickets, with a best of 2/43 against the West Indies. As a youth, Dube was also a talented field hockey player, at one point forgoing selection for a cricket tour of England in order to participate in a hockey tour of Germany and the Netherlands.

In 1990, Dube was selected in the Zimbabwean national team's squad for the 1990 ICC Trophy in the Netherlands. He made his first-class and List A debuts on a warm-up tour of England (against Yorkshire and Sussex, respectively), but suffered a knee injury and was unable to take part in the ICC Trophy. That injury permanently weakened his knee, which caused him to change his bowling action. The new bowling action led to chronic back pain, with Dube stating that he "never played a game without pain" after 1992. Henry Olonga, who became the first black player to play Test cricket for Zimbabwe, later said that Dube was unfortunate to miss out on selection for Zimbabwe's first Test match, which came when India toured during the 1992–93 season.

In early 1994, Dube played for Matabeleland in the 1993–94 edition of the Logan Cup, which was the first edition to hold first-class status. He made several further appearances over the following two seasons, but had little success, never taking more than two wickets in an innings. Dube's final first-class appearance came against Mashonaland Country Districts in the final of the 1995–96 Logan Cup. By that time, he had quit bowling altogether, and was instead playing as an opening batsman. Dube and his opening partner, Graeme Ferreira, made eight runs between them for the match, but Matabeleland still won, claiming their first Logan Cup title.

== Later life ==
In early 2004, during the initial stages of the Zimbabwean cricket crisis, thirteen prominent Zimbabwean players signed an open letter protesting against perceived interference with the national team's selection panel, which suggested that Dube and Pommie Mbangwa replace two of the existing selectors. Mbangwa was made a selector shortly after the letter was published, and Dube was made a selector later in the year. He served on the national selection panel until January 2006, when he resigned. In December 2005, Dube had also been appointed chairman of the Matabeleland Cricket Association, replacing former international umpire Ahmed Esat. He resigned from that position in May 2006, citing an inability to work within the existing domestic structure, which he said had "collapsed". He had earlier been one of a group of administrators who had written a letter to the International Cricket Council (ICC) which criticised the management of Peter Chingoka, the chairman of Zimbabwe Cricket.

In February 2013, Dube was appointed to the board of the Sports and Recreation Commission, the government agency responsible for sport in Zimbabwe.
