= Graeme Ferreira =

Zimbabwean cricketer (born 1977)

Personal information
- Full name: Graeme David Ferreira
- Born: 10 April 1977 (age 49); Salisbury, Rhodesia
- Batting: Right-handed
- Bowling: Right-arm off-spin

Domestic team information
- Years: Team
- 1996: Matabeleland
- 2000: Midlands
- Source: CricketArchive, 6 April 2016

Graeme David Ferreira (born 10 April 1977) is a former Zimbabwean cricketer who represented Matabeleland and Midlands in Zimbabwean domestic cricket. He played as an all-rounder, batting right-handed and bowling right-arm off-spin.

Ferreira was born in Salisbury (now known as Harare). He was selected for the Zimbabwe under-19s team during the 1995–96 season, and played four matches against the England under-19s. Ferreira made his first-class debut in April 1996, playing for Matabeleland against Mashonaland Country Districts in the final of the 1995–96 Logan Cup. He opened the batting with Ethan Dube in both innings, and Matabeleland won by six wickets despite the pair scoring only eight runs between them. After his debut, Ferreira did not return to first-class level until the 1999–00 Logan Cup, where he played three matches for Midlands. In his first match of the season, against CFX Academy, he made 46 runs from 84 balls, the highest score of his career. In the next match, against Matabeleland, he took 4/55 and 5/45, finishing with match figures of 9/100. Ferreira's final first-class match came against Mashonaland, and saw Midlands lose by 251 runs after being bowled out for 31 and 56.
