= Harare South Country Club =

Cricket ground in Harare, Zimababwe

- Interactive map of Harare South Country Club

Ground information
- Location: Harare, Mashonaland, Zimbabwe
- Country: Zimbabwe
- Coordinates: 18.0069°S 30.9620°E
- Establishment: c. 1981

Team information
Mashonaland Country Districts	(1993/94–1995/96)
Mashonaland	(1997/98)
- As of 4 February 2022; Source: Ground profile

The Harare South Country Club is a country club to the south of Harare. Its facilities include a golf course and a cricket ground. The cricket ground has played host to first-class and List A one-day matches. It first hosted first-class cricket in 1987, when Zimbabwe B played Pakistan B. Following Zimbabwe's elevation to Test status in 1992, matches in the Logan Cup gained first-class status, with both Mashonaland Country Districts and Mashonaland using the ground for home matches; the ground also played host to List A matches for both Mashonaland Country Districts and Zimbabwe Country Districts, in addition to hosting three matches in the 2000 ICC Emerging Nations Tournament. First-class cricket has not been played there since 1997 and List A cricket has not been played there since 2001.

== Records ==
=== First-class ===
- Highest team total: 600 for 6 declared by Sri Lankans v Mashonaland Country Districts, 1994–95
- Lowest team total: 123 all out by Mashonaland Country Districts v Matabeleland, 1994–95
- Highest individual innings: 202 by Aravinda de Silva for Sri Lankans v Mashonaland Country Districts, 1994–95
- Best bowling in an innings: 7-75 by Paul Strang for Mashonaland Country Districts v Mashonaland Under-24s, 1994–95
- Best bowling in a match: 9-141 by Bryan Strang for Mashonaland Country Districts v Mashonaland, 1995–96

=== List A ===
- Highest team total: 354 for 6 by South Africa v Zimbabwe Country Districts, 1995–96
- Lowest team total: 167 all out by Denmark v Netherlands, 1999–00
- Highest individual innings: 235 by Brian McMillan for South Africa v Zimbabwe Country Districts, 1995–96
- Best bowling in an innings: 5-26 by Dick Kramer for Netherlands v Denmark, 1999–00

== See also ==
- List of cricket grounds in Zimbabwe
