= Paul Mitchell =

Paul Mitchell may refer to:

== Sports ==
- Paul Mitchell (American football) (1920–2017), American football player
- Paul Mitchell (athlete) (born 1970), Australian Paralympian
- Paul Mitchell (baseball) (born 1949), American baseball player
- Paul Mitchell (broadcaster) (born 1968), Scottish sports broadcaster
- Paul Mitchell (cricketer) (born 1975), Zimbabwean cricketer
- Paul Mitchell (footballer, born 1971), English footballer
- Paul Mitchell (footballer, born 1981), English footballer
- Paul Mitchell (rugby union) (born 1967), New Zealand rugby union player

== Others ==
- Paul Mitchell (hairdresser) (1936–1989), Scottish hairstylist and cofounder of John Paul Mitchell Systems
  - The products of John Paul Mitchell Systems, are also often labelled "Paul Mitchell"
- Paul Mitchell (politician) (1956–2021), American politician
- Paul Mitchell (writer), Australian author
- Paul Mitchell, member of American R&B vocal group the Floaters
