= Hemang Badani =

Indian commentator and former cricketer

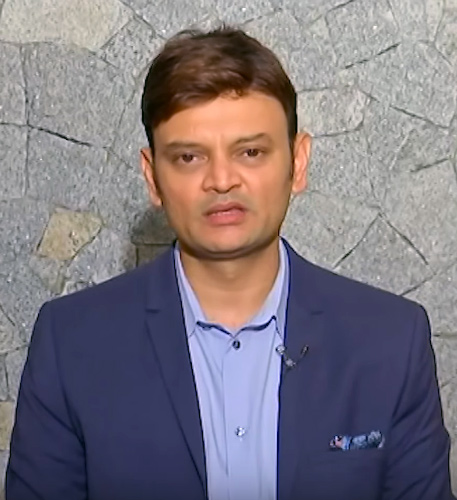
- Hemang Badani in 2019

Personal information
- Full name: Hemang Kamal Badani
- Born: 14 November 1976 (age 49); Madras, Tamil Nadu, India
- Batting: Left-handed
- Bowling: Slow left-arm orthodox
- Role: Middle order batsman

International information
- National side: India (2000–2004)
- Test debut (cap 237): 15 June 2001 v Zimbabwe
- Last Test: 29 August 2001 v Sri Lanka
- ODI debut (cap 130): 30 May 2000 v Bangladesh
- Last ODI: 13 March 2004 v Pakistan

Domestic team information
- Years: Team
- 1996–2007: Tamil Nadu
- 2009–2010: Rajasthan
- 2010–2011: Haryana
- 2011–2013: Vidarbha
- 2007-2008: Chennai Superstars

Career statistics
Competition	Test	ODI	FC	LA
Matches	4	40	121	148
Runs scored	94	867	6,758	4,212
Batting average	15.60	33.34	45.97	40.11
100s/50s	0/0	1/4	14/45	5/24
Top score	38	100	164	111*
Balls bowled	248	1,180	942	1405
Wickets	0	3	7	35
Bowling average	–	31.81	86.14	33.88
5 wickets in innings	–	0	0	0
10 wickets in match	–	0	0	0
Best bowling	–	1/7	1/6	3/26
Catches/stumpings	6/–	13/–	84/–	60/–
Medal record
Men's Cricket
Representing India
ICC Champions Trophy
Runner-up	2000 Kenya
- Source: ESPNcricinfo, 1 September 2023

Hemang Kamal Badani (Born 14 November 1976) is a former Indian international cricketer. He is a left-handed batter and an occasional slow left-arm bowler. He represented the Indian cricket team while also representing Tamil Nadu, Rajasthan, Haryana and Vidarbha in domestic cricket. He was part of the Indian squad that finished as runners-up at the 2000 ICC Champions Trophy. He is the present head coach of Delhi Capitals team in the Indian Premier League.

== Early life ==
Hemang Badani was born on 14 November 1976 in a Gujarati family in Madras, Tamil Nadu. Badani is fluent in languages Tamil, English, Gujarati, Hindi and French.

== Career ==
=== International ===
Badani made his ODI debut in May 2000 in the Asia Cup match against Bangladesh at Dhaka, scoring 35 in an Indian victory. Badani was part of the Indian team that played the 2000–01 Sharjah Champions Trophy against Zimbabwe and Sri Lanka. Badani played all the five matches in the home series against Zimbabwe that followed, scoring 153 runs with two fifties. Badani played the subsequent home ODI series against Australia in which he scored 166 runs in five matched with his only international century coming in the second match on 28 March 2001 at Pune.

Badani made his test debut for India against Zimbabwe in the second test at Harare Sports Club during the India tour of Zimbabwe in June 2001. He was also part of the triangular ODI tournament with West Indies and Zimbabwe that followed the test series, scoring 83 runs across four matches. Badani scored just 78 runs in six matches in the triangular ODI tournament featuring Sri Lanka and New Zealand. Badani played only four test matches with the last match coming against Sri Lanka in August 2001 during the same Indian tour to Sri Lanka. Overall, he scored 94 runs in four matches at an average of 15.66 in test cricket.

Badani continued to play ODIs and was next part of the squad for the home series against England in January 2002. But he again had meager returns scoring just 89 runs across six matches. Badani played very few matches over the next few months due to his inconsistent form. In November 2003, he made a comeback in the TVS cup against Australia and New Zealand. Badani was part of the VB series in January 2004 in Australia in which he scored 133 runs at an average of 44.33. Badani played his last ODI on 13 March 2004 in the first match of the India's tour to Pakistan at Karachi. Overall, he scored 867 runs in 40 matches at an average of 33.34.

=== Domestic ===
He made his debut for Tamil Nadu in 1996-97 and played domestic cricket for them for thirteen seasons. He was a prolific scorer in first class cricket scoring more than six thousand runs with 14 centuries at an average just below 46. Badani reached the finals of Ranji Trophy two times with Tamil Nadu in the 2002-03 and 2003-04 seasons. Badani captained the team that won the domestic one day cup in 2004–05. Badani represented Rajasthan in the 2009-10 Vijay Hazare Trophy and Haryana in the 2010–11 Ranji Trophy. He played for Vidarbha from 2011-12 to 2013-14.

=== T20 cricket ===
In 2007, Badani signed up and played for the Chennai Superstars in the Indian Cricket League (ICL). BCCI banned the players involved in ICL before granting amnesty in 2009 with a mandated cooling off period of one year. On 27 January 2010, he was signed by Chennai Super Kings for the 2010 Indian Premier League but did not make it to the playing eleven for any of the matches.

== Post-retirement ==
Badani has served as the head coach for Chepauk Super Gillies in Tamil Nadu Premier League since its inception in 2016. He has coached them for seven seasons with Super Gillies winning the title four times. He also served as a consultant for Jaffna Kings in Lanka Premier League. In December 2021, Badani was appointed as fielding coach and scout of the Sunrisers Hyderabad team in Indian Premier League and continued in the role till July 2023. Delhi Capitals announced Badani as their head coach for the 2025 and 2026 seasons of Indian Premier League.

He is also an active commentator in Star Sports Tamil.
