= Jason Oates =

Zimbabwean cricketer (born 1974)

Personal information
- Full name: Jason Mark Oates
- Born: 11 July 1974 (age 52); Salisbury, Rhodesia
- Batting: Left-handed
- Bowling: Slow left-arm orthodox

Domestic team information
- Years: Team
- 1995/96: Mashonaland Country Districts
- 1996/97: Mashonaland
- 1997/98–1998/99: Mashonaland A

Career statistics
| Competition | FC | LA |
|---|---|---|
| Matches | 4 | 2 |
| Runs scored | 218 | 21 |
| Batting average | 27.25 | 10.50 |
| 100s/50s | 1/0 | 0/0 |
| Top score | 115 | 13 |
| Balls bowled | 12 | – |
| Wickets | 0 | – |
| Bowling average | – | – |
| 5 wickets in innings | – | – |
| 10 wickets in match | – | – |
| Best bowling | – | – |
| Catches/stumpings | 5/– | 0/– |
- Source: ESPNcricinfo, 15 July 2021

Jason Mark Oates (born 11 July 1974) is a former Zimbabwean cricketer. In first-class cricket, he played the final of the 1995–96 Logan Cup for Mashonaland Country Districts, one match for Mashonaland against Western Province in 1996, and two Logan Cup matches for Mashonaland A in 1997 and 1999, respectively.
