= List of Zimbabwe Test wicket-keepers =

This is a chronological list of Zimbabwean wicket-keepers, that is, Test cricketers who have kept wicket in a match for Zimbabwe. Figures do not include catches made when the player was a non-wicket-keeper.

No.	Player	Span	Tests	Catches	Stumpings	Total dismissals
1.	Andy Flower	1992–2002	55	142	9	151
2.	Wayne James	1993–1994	4	16	0	16
3.	Tatenda Taibu	2001–2012	27	56	5	61
4.	Regis Chakabva	2011–present	13	33	4	37
5.	Brendan Taylor	2013–2017	2	3	0	3
6.	Richmond Mutumbami	2013–2014	6	17	2	19
7.	Peter Moor	2016	3	6	1	7

== See also ==
- List of Zimbabwean Test cricketers
