= Nathan Batson =

English cricketer

Cricket information
- Batting: Right-handed
- Bowling: Right arm off-break

Career statistics
Competition	First-class	List A
Matches	8	1
Runs scored	231	43
Batting average	15.40	43.00
100s/50s	0/1	0/0
Top score	72	43
Catches/stumpings	5/–	0/–
- Source: Cricinfo, 14 April 2023

Nathan Evan Batson (born 24 July 1978) is a former English cricketer who had a brief county cricket career with Worcestershire. He was born in Basildon, Essex.

Batson was discovered by Worcestershire after writing to the county the previous winter to ask for a trial. After one match for Essex Second XI, and several more for Worcestershire seconds, he made his first-class debut for Worcestershire in August, scoring 15 and 4 against Nottinghamshire at Kidderminster. He appeared in a further two matches that season, but made little impression in either of them. That winter, he played a single List A game for Zimbabwe Cricket Academy against England A at the Harare South Country Club ground, making 43.

Batson played three successive first-class matches in May 1999, but 91 runs in six innings was not enough to keep him in contention and he returned to the seconds. There he continued to struggle at first, but two hundreds and two more half-centuries in July was enough to gain him another chance in the County Championship game against Yorkshire in early August. He was dismissed for 1 in each innings, but managed 72 (his career best) and 16 not out against Sri Lanka A a few days later. That was to prove his final appearance in senior cricket, although he did play one further match for Essex Second XI in 2000.

In club cricket, Batson played for Billericay Cricket Club's first team for 13 years, leaving after the 2006 season when he emigrated to New Zealand with his fiancée. He returned to play for Billericay in the 2008 season.
