= 2000–01 Sharjah Champions Trophy =

One Day International cricket competition

2000-01 Coca-Cola Champions Trophy
- Date: 20–29 October 2000
- Location: Sharjah, United Arab Emirates
- Result: Won by Sri Lanka
- Player of the series: Sanath Jayasuriya (SL)
Teams
India	Sri Lanka	Zimbabwe
Captains
Sourav Ganguly	Sanath Jayasuriya	Heath Streak
Most runs
Sachin Tendulkar (179)	Sanath Jayasuriya (413)	Andy Flower (190)
Most wickets
Zaheer Khan (8)	Muttiah Muralitharan (15)	Travis Friend (9)

The 2000–2001 Coca-Cola Champions Trophy was a triangular ODI cricket competition held in Sharjah, United Arab Emirates from 20 to 29 October 2000. It featured the national cricket teams of India, Sri Lanka and Zimbabwe. Its official sponsor was Coca-Cola. The tournament was won by Sri Lanka, who defeated India in the final.

== Points table ==
Team	Pld	W	L	T	NR	NRR	Pts
Sri Lanka	4	4	0	0	0	+1.226	8
India	4	2	2	0	0	-0.397	4
Zimbabwe	4	0	4	0	0	−0.819	0

== Group stage ==
=== 1st ODI ===
20 October (D/N)
Scorecard

India; 224/8 (50 overs)	v	Sri Lanka; 225/5 (43.5 overs)
Sachin Tendulkar 101 (140); Muttiah Muralitharan 2/36 (10 overs)		Russell Arnold 59 (70); Ajit Agarkar 2/39 (8 overs)

Sri Lanka won by 5 wickets
Sharjah Cricket Association Stadium, Sharjah
Umpires: George Sharp (ENG) and Steve Dunne (NZ)
Player of the match: Sachin Tendulkar (IND)

- India won the toss and elected to bat.

=== 2nd ODI ===
21 October (D/N)
Scorecard

Zimbabwe; 225/4 (50 overs)	v	Sri Lanka; 229/3 (43.5 overs)
Andy Flower 120* (141); Nuwan Zoysa 1/30 (10 overs)		Marvan Atapattu 90 (138); Paul Strang 1/26 (4 overs)

Sri Lanka won by 7 Wickets
Sharjah Cricket Association Stadium, Sharjah
Umpires: George Sharp (ENG) and Daryl Harper (AUS)
Player of the match: Andy Flower (ZIM)

- Sri Lanka won the toss and elected to field.
- Andy Flower scores his 2nd ODI century in his 150th match, after scoring a century on debut during the 1992 World Cup.

=== 3rd ODI ===
22 October (D/N)
Scorecard

India; 265/8 (50 overs)	v	Zimbabwe; 252/6 (50 overs)
Rahul Dravid 85 (121); Travis Friend 4/55 (10 overs)		Andy Flower 63 (68); Zaheer Khan 3/37 (10 overs)

India won by 13 runs
Sharjah Cricket Association Stadium, Sharjah
Umpires: Steve Dunne (NZ) and Daryl Harper (AUS)
Player of the match: Zaheer Khan (IND)

- Zimbabwe won the toss and elected to field.

=== 4th ODI ===
25 October (D/N)
Scorecard

Sri Lanka; 276/9 (50 overs)	v	Zimbabwe; 153 (48.3 overs)
Sanath Jayasuriya 87 (66); Grant Flower 2/29 (8 overs)		Dirk Viljoen 60 (86); Nuwan Zoysa 3/16 (9 overs)

Sri Lanka won by 123 runs
Sharjah Cricket Association Stadium, Sharjah
Umpires: George Sharp (ENG) and Steve Dunne (NZ)
Player of the match: Sanath Jayasuriya (SL)

- Zimbabwe won the toss and elected to field.

=== 5th ODI ===
26 October (D/N)
Scorecard

Zimbabwe; 218/9 (50 overs)	v	India; 219/7 (48.3 overs)
Alistair Campbell 105* (133); Zaheer Khan 4/42 (10 overs)		Sourav Ganguly 66 (98); Travis Friend 3/39 (10 overs)

India won by 3 wickets
Sharjah Cricket Association Stadium, Sharjah
Umpires: Steve Dunne (NZ) and Daryl Harper (AUS)
Player of the match: Alistair Campbell (ZIM)

- India won the toss and elected to field.

=== 6th ODI ===
27 October (D/N)
Scorecard

Sri Lanka; 294/5 (50 overs)	v	India; 226 (48.5 overs)
Mahela Jayawardene 128 (123); Ajit Agarkar 3/48 (10 overs)		Sachin Tendulkar 61 (54); Muttiah Muralitharan 7/30 (10 overs)

Sri Lanka won by 68 runs
Sharjah Cricket Association Stadium, Sharjah
Umpires: George Sharp (ENG) and Steve Dunne (NZ)
Player of the match: Muttiah Muralitharan (SL)

- India won the toss and elected to field.

== Final ==
29 October (D/N)
Scorecard

Sri Lanka; 299/5 (50 overs)	v	India; 54 (26.3 overs)
Sanath Jayasuriya 189 (161); Sourav Ganguly 1/15 (1 overs)		Robin Singh 11 (38); Chaminda Vaas 5/14 (9.3) overs)

Sri Lanka won by 245 runs
Sharjah Cricket Association Stadium, Sharjah
Umpires: George Sharp (ENG) and Daryl Harper (AUS)
Player of the match: Sanath Jayasuriya (SL)

- Sri Lanka won the toss and elected to bat.
- India recorded their lowest team total in ODI and the joint-third lowest overall
