= Finlay Massey =

Australian cricketer (born 1971)

Personal information
- Full name: Finlay Shepherd Massey
- Born: 16 April 1971 (age 55); Melbourne, Victoria, Australia
- Batting: Left-handed
- Bowling: Right-arm medium-fast
- Role: Bowler

Domestic team information
- Years: Team
- 1994/95: Mashonaland Under-24s
- Only First-class: 10 March 1995 Mashonaland Under-24s v Matabeleland

Career statistics
Competition	First-class
Matches	1
Runs scored	–
Batting average	–
100s/50s	–/–
Top score	–
Balls bowled	138
Wickets	2
Bowling average	29.00
5 wickets in innings	0
10 wickets in match	0
Best bowling	2/34
Catches/stumpings	0/0
- Source: CricketArchive (subscription required), 8 November 2011

Finlay Massey (born 16 April 1971) was an Australian cricketer. He was a left-handed batsman and a right-arm medium-fast bowler who played for Mashonaland Under-24s. He was born in Melbourne.

Finlay made a single first-class appearance, during the 1994–95 Zimbabwean cricket season. Playing as a tailender, Massey did not bat during the match, though he bowled 23 overs, taking two wickets.
