= Kevin Murphy (cricketer) =

Zimbabwean cricketer (born 1963)

Personal information
- Born: 15 August 1963 (age 63); Kitwe, Northern Rhodesia
- Source: ESPNcricinfo, 22 February 2017

Kevin Murphy (born 15 August 1963) is a Zimbabwean cricketer. He played one first-class match for Mashonaland in 1993/94.

== See also ==
- List of Mashonaland first-class cricketers
