= Hitesh Hira =

Zimbabwean cricketer (born 1971)

Personal information
- Born: 24 June 1971 (age 55); Salisbury, Zimbabwe
- Source: ESPNcricinfo, 22 February 2017

Hitesh Hira (born 24 June 1971) is a Zimbabwean cricketer. He played nine first-class matches for Mashonaland between 1992/1993 and 1994/95.

== See also ==
- List of Mashonaland first-class cricketers
