= Darrell Goodwin =

Zimbabwean cricketer (born 1965)

Personal information
- Born: 2 September 1965 (age 61); Bulawayo, Zimbabwe
- Source: ESPNcricinfo, 22 February 2017

Darrell Goodwin (born 2 September 1965) is a Zimbabwean cricketer. He played two first-class matches for Mashonaland in 1994/95.

In February 2020, he was named in Zimbabwe's squad for the Over-50s Cricket World Cup in South Africa. However, the tournament was cancelled during the third round of matches due to the COVID-19 pandemic.

== See also ==
- List of Mashonaland first-class cricketers
