= Pakistani cricket team in Zimbabwe in 2013 =

International cricket tour

Pakistan cricket team in Zimbabwe in 2013
	Zimbabwe	Pakistan
- Dates: 23 August 2013 – 14 September 2013
Captains	Brendan Taylor	Misbah-ul-Haq (Test, ODI); Mohammad Hafeez (T20I)

Test series
- Result: 2-match series drawn 1–1
Most runs	Hamilton Masakadza (139)	Younus Khan (309)
Most wickets	Tendai Chatara (11)	Saeed Ajmal (14)
- Player of the series: Younus Khan (Pakistan)

One Day International series
- Results: Pakistan won the 3-match series 2–1
Most runs	Brendan Taylor (148)	Mohammad Hafeez (232)
Most wickets	Tendai Chatara (5)	Saeed Ajmal (6)
- Player of the series: Mohammad Hafeez (Pakistan)

Twenty20 International series
- Results: Pakistan won the 2-match series 2–0
Most runs	Hamilton Masakadza (59)	Ahmed Shehzad (168)
Most wickets	Tendai Chatara (2); Shingi Masakadza (2)	Mohammad Hafeez (4)
- Player of the series: Ahmed Shehzad (Pakistan)

The Pakistan national cricket team toured Zimbabwe from 23 August to 14 September 2013. The tour consisted of two Twenty20 International matches, three One Day International matches, and two Test matches. The limited overs matches was played at the Harare Sports Club while the Test matches were split between Harare and the Queens Sports Club in Bulawayo.

The series was originally supposed to take place the previous December but was postponed as it clashed with Pakistan's tour of India after the two countries decided to resume bilateral cricketing relations.

The second Test match was originally scheduled to take place at Queens Sports Club in Bulawayo but was moved to Harare as a cost saving measure. Zimbabwe's victory in the second Test was their first against another Test nation other than Bangladesh since their victory over India in 2001.

== Squads ==
Tests		ODIs		T20Is	
Zimbabwe	Pakistan	Zimbabwe	Pakistan	Zimbabwe	Pakistan
Brendan Taylor (c & wk); Tendai Chatara; Elton Chigumbura; Hamilton Masakadza; Shingi Masakadza; Tino Mawoyo; Richmond Mutumbami; Tinashe Panyangara; Vusi Sibanda; Sikandar Raza; Prosper Utseya; Brian Vitori; Malcolm Waller	Misbah-ul-Haq (c); Mohammad Hafeez; Shan Masood; Asad Shafiq; Khurram Manzoor; Adnan Akmal (wk); Faisal Iqbal; Younis Khan; Azhar Ali; Junaid Khan; Wahab Riaz; Saeed Ajmal; Abdul Rehman; Rahat Ali; Ehsan Adil	Brendan Taylor (c & wk); Tendai Chatara; Elton Chigumbura; Michael Chinouya; Timycen Maruma; Hamilton Masakadza; Shingi Masakadza; Tino Mawoyo; Natsai Mushangwe; Tinotenda Mutombodzi; Richmond Mutumbami; Tinashe Panyangara; Vusi Sibanda; Sikandar Raza; Prosper Utseya; Brian Vitori; Malcolm Waller; Sean Williams	Misbah-ul-Haq (c); Mohammad Hafeez; Nasir Jamshed; Ahmed Shehzad; Asad Shafiq; Umar Amin; Umar Akmal (wk); Shahid Afridi; Saeed Ajmal; Mohammad Irfan; Junaid Khan; Abdul Rehman; Asad Ali; Anwar Ali; Haris Sohail	Tendai Chatara; Chamu Chibhabha; Elton Chigumbura; Timycen Maruma; Hamilton Masakadza; Shingi Masakadza; Natsai Mushangwe; Tinashe Panyangara; Vusi Sibanda; Sikandar Raza; Brendan Taylor (c & wk); Prosper Utseya; Brian Vitori; Malcolm Waller; Sean Williams	Mohammad Hafeez (c); Nasir Jamshed; Ahmed Shehzad; Umar Amin; Umar Akmal; Sohaib Maqsood; Shahid Afridi; Saeed Ajmal; Sohail Tanvir; Mohammad Irfan; Junaid Khan; Zulfiqar Babar; Asad Ali; Anwar Ali; Haris Sohail

== T20I series ==
=== 1st T20I ===
23 August
13:30
Scorecard

Pakistan; 161/5 (20 overs)	v	Zimbabwe; 136/5 (20 overs)
Ahmed Shehzad 70 (50); Tendai Chatara 2/30 (4 overs)		Brendan Taylor 32* (30); Shahid Afridi 3/25 (4 overs)

Pakistan won by 25 runs
Harare Sports Club, Harare
Umpires: Owen Chirombe (Zim) and Jeremiah Matibiri (Zim)
Player of the match: Ahmed Shehzad (Pak)

- Zimbabwe won the toss and elected to field
- T20I debuts: Sohaib Maqsood (Pakistan)

=== 2nd T20I ===
24 August
13:30
Scorecard

Pakistan; 179/1 (20 overs)	v	Zimbabwe; 160/6 (20 overs)
Ahmed Shehzad 98* (64); Shingi Masakadza 1/42 (4 overs)		Hamilton Masakadza 41 (32); Mohammad Hafeez 3/30 (4 overs)

Pakistan won by 19 runs
Harare Sports Club, Harare
Umpires: Owen Chirombe (Zim) and Russell Tiffin (Zim)
Player of the match: Ahmed Shehzad (Pak)

- Zimbabwe won the toss and elected to field
- The score of 98* by Ahmed Shehzad set the record for highest total for a Pakistani batter in a T20I.
- The second wicket partnership of 143 runs between Shehzad and Mohammad Hafeez is the highest T20I partnership for a pair of Pakistani batsmen.

== ODI series ==
=== 1st ODI ===
27 August
09:30
Scorecard

Pakistan; 244/7 (50 overs)	v	Zimbabwe; 246/3 (48.2 overs)
Misbah-ul-Haq 83* (85); Tendai Chatara 2/32 (10 overs)		Hamilton Masakadza 85 (104); Saeed Ajmal 2/44 (10 overs)

Zimbabwe won by 7 wickets
Harare Sports Club, Harare
Umpires: Richard Illingworth (Eng) and Russell Tiffin (Zim)
Player of the match: Hamilton Masakadza (Zim)

- Pakistan won the toss and elected to bat.

=== 2nd ODI ===
29 August
09:30
Scorecard

Pakistan; 299/4 (50 overs)	v	Zimbabwe; 209 (42.4 overs)
Mohammad Hafeez 136* (130); Brian Vitori 2/68 (10 overs)		Brendan Taylor 79 (95); Junaid Khan 4/15 (7 overs)

Pakistan won by 90 runs
Harare Sports Club, Harare
Umpires: Richard Illingworth (Eng) and Owen Chirombe (Zim)
Player of the match: Mohammad Hafeez (Pak)

- Zimbabwe won the toss and elected to field

=== 3rd ODI ===
31 August
09:30
Scorecard

Pakistan; 260/6 (50 overs)	v	Zimbabwe; 152 (40 overs)
Misbah-ul-Haq 67 (85); Tendai Chatara 3/48 (10 overs)		Malcolm Waller 48 (71); Saeed Ajmal 2/15 (7 overs)

Pakistan won by 108 runs
Harare Sports Club, Harare
Umpires: Richard Illingworth (Eng) and Jeremiah Matibiri (Zim)
Player of the match: Misbah-ul-Haq (Pak)

- Zimbabwe won the toss and elected to field.

== Test series ==
=== 1st Test ===
3–7 September
Scorecard

Pakistan	v	Zimbabwe
249 (90.1 overs); Azhar Ali 78 (185); Tendai Chatara 3/64 (22.1 overs)		327 (103.3 overs); Malcolm Waller 70 (100); Saeed Ajmal 7/95 (32.3)
419/9d (149.3 overs); Younus Khan 200* (414); Prosper Utseya 3/137 (37.3 overs)		120 (46.4 overs); Elton Chigumbura 28 (35); Saeed Ajmal 4/23 (16.4 overs)

Pakistan won by 221 runs
Harare Sports Club, Harare
Umpires: Steve Davis (Aus) and Ranmore Martinesz (Sri)
Player of the match: Younus Khan (Pakistan)

- Zimbabwe won the toss and elected to field.
- Sikandar Raza (Zimbabwe) made his Test debut.

=== 2nd Test ===
10–14 September
Scorecard

Zimbabwe	v	Pakistan
294 (109.5 overs); Hamilton Masakadza 75 (169); Junaid Khan 4/67 (33 overs)		230 (104.5 overs); Younus Khan 77 (223); Brian Vitori 5/61 (26.5 overs)
199 (89.5 overs); Tino Mawoyo 58 (165); Rahat Ali 5/52 (24.5 overs)		239 (81 overs); Misbah-ul-Haq 79 (181)*; Tendai Chatara 5/61 (23 overs)

Zimbabwe won by 24 runs
Harare Sports Club, Harare
Umpires: Steve Davis (Aus) and Ranmore Martinesz (Sri)
Player of the match: Tendai Chatara (Zimbabwe)

- Zimbabwe won the toss and elected to bat
- This was Zimbabwe's first victory against another Test nation other than Bangladesh since their victory over India in 2001

== Broadcasting Rights ==
TV Broadcaster(s)	Country	Notes
Super Sport	South Africa; Zimbabwe	Official Broadcasters of the tournament.
PTV Sports	Pakistan	
TEN Sports	Pakistan; West Indies; Sri Lanka	
TEN Cricket	Bangladesh; India	
