= Justin Inglis =

English cricketer (born 1972)

Personal information
- Born: 16 January 1972 (age 54); Solihull, England
- Source: ESPNcricinfo, 22 February 2017

Justin Inglis (born 16 January 1972) is an English-born Zimbabwean cricketer. He played two first-class matches for Mashonaland in 1993/94.

== See also ==
- List of Mashonaland first-class cricketers
