= Mashonaland Under-24s cricket team =

Sports Team

Mashonaland Under-24s
Team information
- Established: 1994 (First-class)
- Last match: 1995
- Home venue: Alexandra Sports Club

The Mashonaland Under-24s cricket team was a first-class cricket team representing the Mashonaland province in Zimbabwe. They competed in the Logan Cup from 1994 to 1995. The club played their home matches at the Alexandra Sports Club.

== First-class record ==
Season	Position	Leading run-scorer	Runs	Leading wicket-taker	Wickets
1993–94	Champions	Grant Flower	381	Darlington Matambanadzo	10
1994–95	2nd	Grant Flower	386	Craig Wishart	11

== See also ==
- Finlay Massey
