= Dick Kramer =

Dutch cricketer

Personal information
- Full name: Dick Kramer
- Born: 1 November 1972 (age 54); The Hague, South Holland, Netherlands
- Batting: Right-handed
- Bowling: Right-arm off break

Domestic team information
- Years: Team
- 1999–2000: Netherlands

Career statistics
Competition	List A
Matches	7
Runs scored	13
Batting average	6.50
100s/50s	–/–
Top score	6
Balls bowled	342
Wickets	9
Bowling average	27.33
5 wickets in innings	1
10 wickets in match	–
Best bowling	5/26
Catches/stumpings	3/–
- Source: Cricinfo, 8 February 2022

Dick Kramer (born 1 November 1972) is a Dutch former cricketer.

Kramer was born at The Hague in November 1972. A club cricketer for Quick Haag, Kramer made his debut in List A one-day cricket for the Netherlands against Durham in the 1999 NatWest Trophy, an English domestic one-day tournament the Netherlands were invited to take part in. With the Dutch defeating Durham, they advanced to the next round of the competition against Kent, where Kramer claimed the wicket of Andrew Symonds as his first List A wicket. He was selected in the Dutch squad for the 2000 ICC Emerging Nations Tournament, where he made a further four one-day appearances. Against Denmark he took a five wicket haul, with figures of 5 for 26 in a Dutch victory. His final one-day appearance came in the 2000 NatWest Trophy against Lincolnshire. In seven one-day appearances, Kramer took 9 wickets at an average of 27.33.
