= Glen Sulzberger =

New Zealand cricketer (born 1973)

Personal information
- Full name: Glen Paul Sulzberger
- Born: 14 March 1973 (age 53); Kaponga, Taranaki, New Zealand
- Batting: Left-handed
- Bowling: Right-arm off-spin

Domestic team information
- Years: Team
- 1995/96–2004/05: Central Districts

Career statistics
Competition	ODI	FC	LA
Matches	3	83	94
Runs scored	9	3,836	1,895
Batting average	9.00	31.18	27.86
100s/50s	0/0	8/17	0/10
Top score	6*	159	71
Balls bowled	132	11,263	3,195
Wickets	3	147	65
Bowling average	34.00	35.20	34.63
5 wickets in innings	0	2	0
10 wickets in match	–	0	–
Best bowling	1/28	6/54	3/18
Catches/stumpings	0/–	57/–	49/–
- Source: Cricinfo, 29 August 2026

Glen Paul Sulzberger (born 14 March 1973) is a New Zealand former cricketer. He played three One Day Internationals for New Zealand in 2000. Sulzberger was a member of the New Zealand team that won the 2000 ICC KnockOut Trophy.

A middle-order batsman and off-spinner, Sulzberger played first-class cricket for Central Districts from 1996 to 2005, captaining the team in 2001/02, 2003/04 and 2004/05. His highest score was 159 against Wellington in 1999/00, and his best bowling figures were 6 for 54 against Canterbury in 2003–04. He was a member of the Taranaki team that won the Hawke Cup in March 1994 and held it until January 1996.

As of 2026, Sulzberger is the commercial manager for the New Zealand Cricket Players' Association.
