= Paul Mitchell (cricketer) =

Zimbabwean cricketer (born 1975)

Personal information
- Full name: Paul Michael Mitchell
- Born: 13 January 1975 (age 51); Salisbury, Zimbabwe
- Source: ESPNcricinfo, 22 February 2017

Paul Mitchell (born 13 January 1975) is a Zimbabwean cricketer. He played two first-class matches for Mashonaland in 1994/95. his hobbies incl collecting stamps and riding horses and collecting coins

== See also ==
- List of Mashonaland first-class cricketers
