= Wayne James =

Zimbabwean cricketer (born 1965)

Personal information
- Full name: Wayne Robert James
- Born: 27 August 1965 (age 61); Bulawayo, Southern Rhodesia
- Batting: Right-handed
- Role: Batsman, Wicket-keeper

International information
- National side: Zimbabwe (1992–1996)
- Test debut (cap 22): 16–21 December 1993 v Pakistan
- Last Test: 26–31 October 1994 v Sri Lanka
- ODI debut (cap 21): 23 February 1992 v Sri Lanka
- Last ODI: 3 September 1996 v Sri Lanka

Domestic team information
- Years: Team
- 1992/93–1997/98: Matabeleland

Career statistics
Competition	Tests	ODI	FC	LA
Matches	4	11	40	36
Runs scored	61	101	2,442	468
Batting average	15.25	14.42	38.15	15.09
100s/50s	0/0	0/0	3/16	0/0
Top score	33	29	215	57
Catches/stumpings	16/0	6/0	101/7	22/1
- Source: ESPNcricinfo, 8 February 2019

Wayne Robert James (born 27 August 1965) is a former cricketer who played as a wicket-keeper batsman for Zimbabwe. Between 2010 and 2014, James was also part of the selection panel for the national team.

His highest first-class score of 215 was made for Matabeleland in the 1995–96 Logan Cup. In the final of the competition, he equaled the record of most dismissals in an innings by a wicket-keeper, with nine. By taking four catches in the second innings he also finished with a match record tally of dismissals with 13. In the same match as he set that record, he scored 99 runs while batting in the first innings and was left stranded on 99 not out in the second innings — the only player to have achieved this double near-miss.
