= Jahangir Alam (umpire) =

Bangladeshi cricket umpire (born 1962)

Personal information
- Born: 1 March 1962 (age 64); Dhaka, Bangladesh

Umpiring information
- ODIs umpired: 3 (2001–2002)
- Source: Cricinfo, 16 May 2014

Jahangir Alam (born 1 March 1962) is a Bangladeshi former cricket umpire. The Dhaka-born Alam officiated in three ODI games, between 2001 and 2002.

== See also ==
- List of One Day International cricket umpires
