= Trevor Stead =

Zimbabwean cricketer (born 1969)

Personal information
- Born: 12 October 1969 (age 57); Gatooma, Zimbabwe
- Source: ESPNcricinfo, 22 February 2017

Trevor Stead (born 12 October 1969) is a Zimbabwean cricketer. He played three first-class matches for Mashonaland in 1993/94.

== See also ==
- List of Mashonaland first-class cricketers
