= Showkatur Rahman =

Bangladeshi cricket umpire (born 1954)

Personal information
- Born: 12 January 1954 (age 72); Khulna, Bangladesh

Umpiring information
- Tests umpired: 1 (2001)
- ODIs umpired: 2 (2001–2002)
- Source: ESPNcricinfo, 3 July 2013

Showkatur Rahman (born 12 January 1954) is a Bangladeshi former cricket umpire and match referee. He stood in one Test match, between Bangladesh and Zimbabwe, in 2001 and two One Day Internationals in 2001 and 2002.

== See also ==
- List of Test cricket umpires
- List of One Day International cricket umpires
