= Nervous nineties =

Analysis paralysis in cricket

The nervous nineties is a commonly used term in cricket. The term refers to an alleged form of analysis paralysis felt by a batter when they have scored more than 90 runs in an innings and are nervous because of the pressure and desire to convert this into a century (100 runs), which is a celebrated milestone of individual success in the game. Batters may tend to bat in a more conservative manner when they are close to a century, in order to avoid getting out and thus missing out on the milestone. Batters dismissed on 99 are considered the unluckiest of the nervous nineties victims.

The opposing captain may position the fielders near the batter in order to create extra pressure to get the batter out by restricting the player to defensive strokes and requiring more risky play to score runs. These events happen despite a century being an arbitrary individual statistic that has no impact beyond the basic addition of more runs to the score.

However, a large-scale analysis of more than 700 Test matches between 2004 and 2022 found no evidence for the existence of the nervous nineties; batters actually score runs at an accelerated pace when in the 90s, faster on average than when in the 70s, 80s, or 100s.

== Records and statistics ==
Statistically, one of the worst victims of the nervous nineties was Australian opener Michael Slater, dismissed in the nineties 9 times in his Test career. West Indian batsman Alvin Kallicharran's record was similarly poor, dismissed in the nineties 7 times for 12 career centuries. India's most renowned cricketer Sachin Tendulkar has scored 90s 18 times in ODIs and 10 times in Test cricket and holds the record for highest number of dismissals in the 90s (a total of 28 times) across all forms of international cricket.

Sir Donald Bradman holds the record for most world centuries scored in a career without ever being dismissed in the nervous nineties: a total of 29 centuries. Greg Chappell (24 centuries) and Michael Vaughan (18 centuries) have the next best records.

While most dedicated batters can achieve multiple centuries and potentially dozens of opportunities to score them, for many all-rounders and bowlers, it can be rare for an innings to last long enough to achieve a century because of team-mates losing their wickets, or for the lower-skilled bowler to be effective enough in stroke play to come close to a century on many occasions. Shane Warne, who was considered to have a good level of skill as a power-hitting lower-order batsman, played 199 Test innings as a batsman and achieved 12 half-centuries. He was dismissed twice in the 90s, once on 90, and once on 99. Ashton Agar, playing on debut for Australia against England, came in as the last bat and compiled the highest ever score for a number 11 batter, but fell for 98 with a rash pull shot from a bouncer, after nervously swatting and missing at two previous deliveries.

It is relatively rare for a player to be dismissed for 99 more than once in a Test career, although this fate did befall M. J. K. Smith, Saleem Malik, John Wright, Richie Richardson, Greg Blewett, Sourav Ganguly, Simon Katich and Mike Atherton. In one particularly striking example of the nervous nineties, Atherton was run out for 99 at Lord's in 1993 after starting to run for the single which would have brought up his century, then changing his mind, slipping and failing to remake his ground. Atherton would never make a century at Lord's in Test cricket. Pakistan's Misbah-ul-Haq has been dismissed for 99 twice and remained not out on 99 once. Nine players have been dismissed on 99 in Test cricket without ever making a century including Shane Warne, Dipak Patel and Martyn Moxon. Additionally, Alex Tudor remained not out on 99 once, and never made a Test century. A statistical oddity occurred at the Karachi test between England and Pakistan in March 1973 when three players (including two in the same innings, Majid Khan and Mushtaq Mohammed) were dismissed for 99. Geoff Boycott was the first player to be dismissed for 99 in a one-day international.

Nervous nineties are also applicable for the batters who get dismissed at 190s or the 290s. Steven Smith the Aussie skipper against West Indies in April 2015, Younis Khan of Pakistan, Faf du Plessis of South Africa, and KL Rahul, Mohammad Azharuddin, Shikhar Dhawan, Virender Sehwag, Cheteshwar Pujara of India were dismissed once in 190s, Rahul Dravid and Sachin Tendulkar of India were dismissed twice in the 190s, while Michael Vaughan, who would never reach 200 in any class of cricket, was dismissed twice in the 190s in the same series in 2002. England's Sir Alastair Cook was dismissed for 294 against India in 2011, India's Virender Sehwag was dismissed for 293 against Sri Lanka in 2009, and Martin Crowe, a New Zealand captain, was dismissed for 299 against Sri Lanka in 1991. The nervous nineties are even applicable when a batter is in the 390s or the 490s. Hanif Mohammad was famously run out while going for his 500th run in his famed 499 in the 1958-59 Quaid-e-Azam Trophy.

In T20 Internationals, four batters have been dismissed for 99 and 7 players have achieved 99 not out in this format. There have been many cases where a batter has been dismissed on 99 in domestic T20 cricket including Marcus Stoinis from the Big Bash League, Ishan Kishan, Chris Gayle, Virat Kohli and Prithvi Shaw from the Indian Premier League.

== Research ==
A 2023 paper by researchers at the University of Melbourne and RMIT University examined all Test matches between 2004 and 2022, a span covering more than 1.4 million deliveries. Their data analysis found that batter's rate of dismissal was no higher while in the 90s than before or after it. Batters in the 90s also score at an accelerated pace — possibly because opposing fielders crowd closer, opening room for more aggressive and higher-scoring shots to the boundary. The authors conclude:

Our analysis of batting metrics before and after 100 indicates that the century milestone (and its consequences) elicits a change in batting behaviour among international test cricketers. With 100 runs in reach, batters tend to accelerate scoring and boundary making, with no apparent cost to the probability of dismissal. Taking these results together, we surmise that the approach to 100 (including the nineties) is a productive, even successful time for international cricketers to bat. While it is possible that batters are rushing—and thus batting avoidantly and anxiously—they may also be exploiting newly formed gaps in the field introduced by the fielding side to subdue run-scoring. Either way, the results present an encouraging example of elevated performance when close to a highly valued achievement among an elite population.
