= Gary Martin (Zimbabwean cricketer) =

Zimbabwean cricketer (born 1966)

Personal information
- Born: May 31, 1966 (age 60)
- Batting: Right-handed
- Bowling: Right-arm medium
- Source: Cricinfo, 15 August 2022

Gary Christopher Martin (born 30 May 1966) is former Zimbabwean One Day International cricket bowler who played in five ODIs between 1994 and 1995.
