= Quintin Goosen =

Quintin John Goosen (4 November 1946 - 3 September 2014) was a Zimbabwean cricketer and umpire. He umpired in one Test match and 12 One Day Internationals, all played in Zimbabwe.

Goosen was born in Lonely Mine, Matabeleland. He played cricket for Mashonaland Country Districts before becoming an umpire. He was an umpire in the Logan Cup, Zimbabwe's domestic first-class cricket competition, from 1994 to 2002.

Goosen's only Test match as an umpire was the 2nd Test between Zimbabwe and Pakistan at the Queens Sports Club in Bulawayo in February 1995, where the other on-field umpire was B.C. Cooray from Sri Lanka. Pakistan won easily by 8 wickets within three days of the five-day match, but Pakistani fast bowling great Wasim Akram received a reprimand following the Test for angrily snatching his cap from Goosen after an lbw appeal was rejected. The standard of umpiring in the Test was publicly criticised by Zimbabwean batsman David Houghton, who was also fined.

Goosen also umpired 12 One Day International matches, all played in Zimbabwe between 1994 and 2001, six at Harare Sports Club and six at Queens Sports Club, Bulawayo. He first stood in the 1st ODI between Zimbabwe and Sri Lanka at Harare on 3 November 1994, and his last ODI as umpire was the match between Zimbabwe and England at Bulawayo on 10 October 2001.

He died on 3 September 2014.

== See also ==
- List of Test cricket umpires
- List of One Day International cricket umpires
