= Christian Nyazika =

Zimbabwean cricket umpire (born 1956)

Personal information
- Born: 8 June 1956 (age 70); Umtali, Southern Rhodesia

Umpiring information
- ODIs umpired: 1 (2001)
- Source: Cricinfo, 26 May 2014

Christian Kennedy Nyazika (born 8 June 1956) is a Zimbabwean former cricket umpire. He stood in one ODI game, in 2001.

== See also ==
- List of One Day International cricket umpires
