= Travis Friend =

Zimbabwean cricketer

Personal information
- Full name: Travis John Friend
- Born: 7 January 1981 (age 45); Que Que, Midlands, Zimbabwe
- Nickname: Chunks
- Height: 187 cm (6 ft 2 in)
- Batting: Right-handed
- Bowling: Right-arm fast

International information
- National side: Zimbabwe (2000–2004)
- Test debut (cap 51): 15 June 2001 v India
- Last Test: 26 February 2004 v Bangladesh
- ODI debut (cap 59): 30 September 2000 v New Zealand
- Last ODI: 3 February 2004 v India
- ODI shirt no.: 18

Domestic team information
- Years: Team
- 1999–2000: CFX Academy
- 2000–2004: Midlands
- 2005: Derbyshire

Career statistics
Competition	Test	ODI	FC	LA
Matches	13	51	44	88
Runs scored	447	548	1,791	1,105
Batting average	29.80	16.11	31.42	16.49
100s/50s	0/3	0/3	3/7	0/4
Top score	81	91	183	91
Balls bowled	2,000	1,930	5,608	3,201
Wickets	25	37	79	77
Bowling average	43.60	48.08	39.92	35.92
5 wickets in innings	1	0	2	0
10 wickets in match	0	0	0	0
Best bowling	5/31	4/55	5/16	4/37
Catches/stumpings	2/–	17/–	33/–	30/–
- Source: ESPNcricinfo, 26 April 2017

Travis John Friend (born 7 January 1981) is a former Zimbabwean international cricketer and commercial pilot.

During his short international career, he made sporadic appearances for Zimbabwe, having played only 13 test matches and 51 ODI matches. His international career was cut short due to his fitness issues, being vulnerable as he was to intermittent injuries and he could not quite cement a permanent spot in the playing XI while his involvement in contract dispute with Zimbabwe Cricket at an early age of 24 did not help the cause either. He was certainly well noticed for his ability to bowl at a fierce pace but often had the vulnerability of losing the line and length which also cost him a permanent place in the national team despite his immense talent. He created huge hype in Zimbabwean cricketing fraternity for being a tall, well built, pace bowling all-rounder and batted as a top-order batter at domestic level but he failed to live up to the expectations. Capable of bowling genuine pace, he was often wayward and lacked the necessary control to be a success on the international stage. In addition to his ability to bowl with pace and hostility, he could hold a bat, often being used in the role of a pinch hitter for his team, very much in the mould of Andy Blignaut.

He even built up the reputation as potentially Zimbabwe's own Jacques Kallis in the making very early in his career and he was deemed as the second fastest bowler in Zimbabwe at that time only behind Henry Olonga. He made his international debut at the age of 19 when he made his ODI debut against New Zealand in September 2000 at Queens Sports Club, Harare.

== Biography ==
He was born and raised up in Kwekwe, Midlands Province where he lived majority of his life. His father Ian Friend was also a first-class cricketer who played for Rhodesia B in two first-class matches. He began playing cricket at his family garden with his elder brother Jason Friend. His great-grandfather was also a cricketer who also played in the Logan Cup.

He attended Goldridge Primary School where his father Ian Friend served as his first cricket coach. He eventually played his first match for his school team while he was studying in Grade 3. He was chosen for the Midlands team to play in the national primary schools cricket week while he was studying in Grade 4. He went on a tour to South Africa with a Mashonaland Country Districts team and played primarily as a batsman bowling legspin. He was a regular selection for the national age-group teams. He played at Under-14, Under-16 and Under-19 levels. He also produced notable batting performances at the South African Schools Week, scoring 85 against Boland and 59 against Natal.

He applied to enroll at the CFX Academy in 1998 which meant he had to give up his final year at school. However, he was advised by Dave Houghton and by others who advised him to first of all finish his studies and then urged him to join the CFX Academy in 2000. He began playing club cricket for Old Georgians in the 1997/98 season but only featured in one game but during the following season 1998/99, he became a regular feature for Old Georgians.

He was nicknamed as "Testosterone". He was also fondly called by his teammates as Chunks referring to his body structure and height. He began his cricket career as a legspinner but he later switched to bowling right arm fast medium just two years prior to his international debut.

Friend is married, and has a son and a daughter.

== International career ==
He served as the vice-captain of the Zimbabwean team during the 2000 Under-19 Cricket World Cup. He captained Zimbabwe in four under-19 ODIs.

He made his ODI debut on 30 September 2000 against New Zealand during Zimbabwe's second match of the three match home bilateral ODI series which Zimbabwe won by surprise 2-1. He bowled seven wicketless overs conceding 29 runs on his ODI debut and Zimbabwe eventually secured the victory by 21 runs to level the series 1-1. He the subsequently made his test debut against India on 15 June 2001 during the second and final match of the two-match home test series and Zimbabwe stunned India to win the match by 4 wickets to level the series 1-1. In late 2001, he suffered huge stress fractures at the end of bilateral cricket tours with the national team in Australia and India but he recovered well on time to make himself available again for national selection.

He emerged as the leading wicket-taker for Zimbabwe during the 2000–01 Sharjah Champions Trophy where he bagged nine scalps and despite his efforts, Zimbabwe could not progress to the final. His career best performance came against India during the third match of the 2000–01 Sharjah Champions Trophy when he picked up 4/55 in his ten overs which also included the prized scalps of Sourav Ganguly, Yuvraj Singh and Vinod Kambli. He picked up his maiden five-wicket haul against Bangladesh in only in his fourth test appearance for Zimbabwe during the first of the two match test series in Dhaka. His figures of 5/31 including seven maiden overs in a 18 over spell reduced Bangladesh to just 107 in their first innings and he also registered his career best test knock of 81 while batting at nine position and his knock which came in 161 deliveries propelled Zimbabwe's first innings total to 431 as the test match ended in a draw. For his all-round performances during the first test of the series with both bat and ball, he was awarded the player of the match.

He was a member of the Zimbabwean squad which took part at the 2002 ICC Champions Trophy. He was part of the ZImbabwean squad which emerged as runners-up to Pakistan at the Cherry Blossom Sharjah Cup 2003, although he did not play in the final of the tournament. He was named in the Zimbabwean team at the 2003 Cricket World Cup, a tournament which was marred due to political tensions in Zimbabwe.

His international career with Zimbabwe prematurely ended at the age of 24. In 2004, he was one of the fifteen members of the national team to be sacked by the Zimbabwe Cricket Union which also included the then captain Heath Streak for involving in rebellions and protests against the cricket board regarding lengthy stand-off about their contracts. He did not make any announcement of official retirement from international cricket but his return to national team was highly unlikely to happen.

== Domestic career ==
He made his first-class debut for CFX Academy against Mashonaland Eagles on 3 March 2000 during the 2000–01 Logan Cup. He played club cricket at Duncombe Park, Helmsley, North Yorkshire during the 2000 English cricket season. His back injury prevented him from bowling at more than a gentle medium-pace during his short stint at 2000 season.

He later moved to Sydney to play in Grade League Cricket representing South Sydney District following the lifetime ban imposed by Zimbabwe Cricket on him and 14 fellow cricketers. He originally meant to play in first-class matches but he struggled to attract any interest from top-tier first-class teams and subsequently signed up by South Sydney club after accepting an offer to play in the Sydney Shires competition.

He then switched to the UK in March 2005 to play county cricket for Derbyshire at the County Championship and he eventually made his professional T20 debut for the club against Nottinghamshire on 1 July 2005 during the 2005 Twenty20 Cup. He turned up for Derbyshire and united with former Zimbabwean player Dave Houghton who then served as head coach of Derbyshire. However, his cricketing career at Derbyshire was cut short for just one season as injuries dented the opportunity of securing a contract extension for the following season. He returned to club cricket and eventually ended up playing for Knowle and Dorridge Cricket Club which is one of the prominent Birmingham Premier League Clubs at the Birmingham and District Premier League for three seasons as an overseas player.

In 2009, he signed up for the summer with Castletown Cricket Club on the Isle of Man – the first time any of the island's teams could boast a former Test player. In July 2010, he smashed a record breaking knock of 227 runs for Castletown against Ramsey in Premier Cricket and his knock propelled Castletown to win the match by a margin of 319 runs.

== Aviation career ==
During his playing career in Zimbabwe, he acquired a private pilot certificate in 2001 and also obtained two Advanced Level passes in Art stream and in Geography stream at the St. George's College in Harare. He then took the first steps to become a commercial pilot at the age of 25 in 2006 and he obtained his UK flying licence in 2007. He underwent commercial flight training and pursued flying courses in the UK for a period of one year and during his stay in the UK he had completed all of his commercial exams. He also had stints with airlines such as Flybe and Airbus.
