= Dion Ebrahim =

Zimbabwean cricketer

Personal information
- Full name: Dion Digby Ebrahim
- Born: 7 August 1980 (age 46); Bulawayo, Zimbabwe
- Batting: Right-handed
- Bowling: Right-arm offspin
- Relatives: Kate Ebrahim (wife)

International information
- National side: Zimbabwe (2001–2005)
- Test debut (cap 49): 19 April 2001 v Bangladesh
- Last Test: 20 September 2005 v India
- ODI debut (cap 63): 7 April 2001 v Bangladesh
- Last ODI: 29 January 2005 v Bangladesh

Career statistics
Competition	Test	ODI
Matches	29	82
Runs scored	1,225	1,443
Batting average	22.68	20.61
100s/50s	0/10	1/4
Top score	94	121
Balls bowled	–	5
Wickets	–	0
Bowling average	–	–
5 wickets in innings	–	–
10 wickets in match	–	–
Best bowling	–	–
Catches/stumpings	16/–	23/–
- Source: CricInfo, 11 September 2017

Dion Digby Ebrahim (born 7 August 1980) is a Zimbabwean former cricketer, who played in 29 Test matches and 82 One Day Internationals (ODI) for the Zimbabwe national cricket team. He now lives in New Zealand where he works as a cricket coach.

== International career ==
A graduate of the CFX Academy in Harare, Ebrahim was considered an integral part of Zimbabwean cricket until falling out of favour with authorities.

Ebrahim has a highest ODI score of 121 and a highest Test score of 94. He never hit a six in his international career.

== Domestic career ==
Since leaving Zimbabwe in 2005, he has played in England as the captain of Stony Stratford CC who play in the Northants Premier Division. He also played in New Zealand for the Hawera United Cricket Club and Taranaki in the Hawke Cup. He holds the record for the number of Hawke Cup centuries for Taranaki.

In 2009, he was contracted by Zimbabwean franchise side Matabeleland Tuskers. He appeared for the Tuskers and thus he made himself available for national selection again.

In mid-2011, he played for Shenley village in the Hertfordshire League in England. He spent the 2011/12 and the 2012/13 summers playing in Taranaki, New Zealand.

Ebrahim has coached at almost all levels of cricket in New Zealand, from schools to provincial and national age group levels. In June 2021 he was appointed coach of Otago. He resigned from the position in March 2024.

== Arrest ==
Dion was arrested for using a Zimbabwe Cricket sponsored car after the ZC board did not offer him a new contract. Dion's lawyer told the police that ZC did not pay Dion his outstanding match fees. It was revealed that Tatenda Taibu was also involved in the case. ZC owed both Dion and Tatenda $200,000 each in backpay. Tatenda told Associated Press that he would not give back the car until he had match fee outstandings paid to him fully. But the ZC Board said that the Ebrahim's payment is separate to the continued use of the ZC registered car. The problem remains unsolved.

== Personal life ==
Ebrahim is married to New Zealand international cricketer Kate Ebrahim.
