= Ahmed Esat =

Zimbabwean cricket umpire (born 1956)

Personal information
- Born: 1 September 1956 (age 70); Kwekwe, Southern Rhodesia

Umpiring information
- ODIs umpired: 11 (1995–2002)
- Source: Cricinfo, 18 May 2014

Ahmed Esat (born 1 September 1956) is a Zimbabwean former cricket umpire. He only officiated in eleven One Day Internationals between 1995 and 2002. He became chairman of the Matabeleland Cricket Association in 2002, and served until resigning in December 2005, after which he was replaced by Ethan Dube. Esat also served on the board of the Zimbabwe Cricket Union.

== See also ==
- List of One Day International cricket umpires
