= Mashonaland Country Districts cricket team =

Former senior cricket clubs in Zimbabwe

Mashonaland Country Districts
Team information
- Established: 1993 (First-class)
- Last match: 1996
- Home venue: Harare South Country Club

The Mashonaland Country Districts cricket team was a first-class cricket team representing the Mashonaland province in Zimbabwe. They competed in the Logan Cup from 1993 to 1996. The club played their home matches at the Harare South Country Club.

== First-class record ==
Season	Position	Leading run-scorer	Runs	Leading wicket-taker	Wickets
1993–94	3rd	Andy Waller	206	Paul Strang	12
1994–95	4th	Iain Butchart	240	Paul Strang	16
1995–96	Runners-up	Alistair Campbell	315	Bryan Strang	25
