= Charles Coventry (umpire) =

Zimbabwean cricket umpire (1958–2011)

Personal information
- Full name: Charles Kevin Coventry
- Born: 22 September 1958; Que Que, Rhodesia
- Died: 7 August 2011 (aged 52); Bulawayo, Zimbabwe
- Nickname: Chuck
- Role: Umpire
- Relatives: CK Coventry (son)

Umpiring information
- ODIs umpired: 5 (2000–2001)
- FC umpired: 24 (1993–2002)
- LA umpired: 11 (1997–2001)
- Source: CricketArchive, 4 March 2014

Charles Kevin Coventry Sr. (22 September 1958 – 7 August 2011), known commonly by his nickname Chuck, was a Zimbabwean international cricket umpire who officiated in five One Day Internationals in 2000 and 2001. He died in 2011 at the age of 52, following a heart attack at his home in Bulawayo. His son Charles Coventry is an international cricketer for Zimbabwe.

== See also ==
- List of One Day International cricket umpires
