= Jeff Fenwick =

Zimbabwean cricket umpire (born 1958)

Personal information
- Born: 8 February 1958 (age 68); Ormskirk, Lancashire, England

Umpiring information
- ODIs umpired: 6 (2000–2001)
- Source: Cricinfo, 18 May 2014

Jeff Fenwick (born 8 February 1958) is a former Zimbabwean cricket umpire. He officiated in six international fixtures, all of them One Day Internationals, in 2000–2001.

== See also ==
- List of One Day International cricket umpires
