= Graeme Evans =

Zimbabwean cricket umpire (born 1942)

Personal information
- Born: 4 August 1942 (age 84); Hastings, New Zealand

Umpiring information
- ODIs umpired: 15 (1997–2001)
- Source: Cricinfo, 18 May 2014

Graeme Evans (born 4 August 1942) is a former Zimbabwean cricket umpire. All 15 international fixtures he has officiated in were One Day Internationals.

== See also ==
- List of One Day International cricket umpires
