= Dirk Viljoen =

Zimbabwean cricketer

Cricket information
- Batting: Left-handed
- Bowling: Slow left-arm orthodox

Career statistics
Competition	Tests	ODIs
Matches	2	53
Runs scored	57	512
Batting average	14.25	14.22
100s/50s	0/0	0/2
Top score	38	63*
Balls bowled	105	2,075
Wickets	1	44
Bowling average	65.00	37.25
5 wickets in innings	0	0
10 wickets in match	0	0
Best bowling	1/14	3/20
Catches/stumpings	1/–	18/–
- Source: Cricinfo, 11 February 2006

Dirk Peter Viljoen (born 11 March 1977, in Enkeldoorn – now Chivhu) is a former cricketer who played 2 Tests and 53 One Day Internationals for Zimbabwe. An allrounder, Viljoen bowled slow left arm orthodox and batted in the middle order, left-handed. He won Zimbabwe's Young Cricketer of the Year Award in 1996–97 and was granted a scholarship to the Australian Cricket Academy.

== Career ==
Viljoen debuted for Zimbabwe in Sharjah during the 1996/97 season, playing a One Day International against Sri Lanka. His selection was unexpected because it was his first season of List A cricket and he was also yet to score a first class half century. Filling in for David Houghton, Viljoen made scores of 17, 22 and 25.

Tours of Sri Lanka and New Zealand came during 1997/98. He played in 4 ODI games in New Zealand, top scoring in one of them with 36. His chances to impress with the bat were limited due to him batting in the lower order.

In touring both countries he only managed to play in a single first class game, a warm up match in New Zealand. Viljoen was being seen as a one-day specialist and thus in March 1998 when he was called into the Test squad at Bulawayo, it came as a surprise. With allrounder Gavin Rennie struggling for form, he was dropped for the 1st Test against Pakistan. Viljoen replaced him in the side and opened the batting with Grant Flower. He scored a duck in each innings and the only highlight in the Test for him was his maiden Test wicket, dismissing Moin Khan 3 short of a hundred.

In 1998/99 he spent a season in England where he played for Barnt Green. Back home in Zimbabwe he found form with the bat, scoring his maiden first class half century, an innings of 92 for Mashonaland A against Matabeleland in Bulawayo. Two more half centuries came later in the season against England A. He was selected to play for the Zimbabwe Board XI and he made 155 against Namibia and 100 against Border B. These games however were not first class fixtures.

== International Success ==
His most prolific season with the bat had earned him selection for the World Cup in England in 1999. He played in only the one game, against Australia at Lord's. From a team point of view the tournament was a success as Zimbabwe made it to the Super 6's.

He also scored a first class century, making 173 not out for Mashonaland against Matabeleland in Bulawayo in 1999/2000. His innings was in a 330 run partnership with Craig Evans. England toured Zimbabwe in February 2000 for some ODI games and although Viljoen failed to contribute much with the bat he impressed with the ball, taking 3 wickets in the final match. Viljoen's finest innings with the bat in international cricket came at the site of his debut, in Sharjah and against the same opponents in Sri Lanka. Coming in at number six he made an unbeaten 63.

In 2001/02 at India he played his only other Test match. Batting at number seven this time he made 19 and contributed with 38 in the second. This included a match saving partnership of 113 with Andy Flower.

After moving to Midlands for the 2001/02 domestic season he became their stand-in captain when Douglas Marillier was playing for Zimbabwe. He was announced as their official captain in 2002/03.

== Personal life ==
In 2002, his family were evicted from their farm by the Mugabe government. Viljoen moved to Harare where he continued a career as a broadcaster and commentator following his retirement.

In his career he has played for Mashonaland, Mashonaland A, Mashonaland Under-24s, Matabeleland Invitation XI, Midlands, Young Mashonaland.

== General references ==
- Dirk Viljoen at Cricinfo
