= Ian Robinson (cricket umpire) =

Zimbabwean cricket umpire (1947–2016)

Personal information
- Full name: Ian David Robinson
- Born: 11 March 1947; Oxford, England
- Died: 3 April 2016 (aged 69); Harare, Zimbabwe

Umpiring information
- Tests umpired: 28 (1992–2001)
- ODIs umpired: 90 (1992–2004)
- Source: Cricinfo, 8 September 2007

Ian David Robinson (11 March 1947 – 3 April 2016) was a Zimbabwean cricket umpire who officiated in 28 Test matches and 90 One Day Internationals.

Robinson started his umpiring career in 1975, was promoted to first-class level in 1978 and remained there for 31 seasons. He made his international umpiring debut in Zimbabwe's inaugural Test, against India at Harare in 1992. He was a member of the ICC International Panel and umpired in 3 World Cups.

In 2008, he announced his retirement from top-level umpiring to take up the role of ICC Regional Umpires' Performance Manager for the Africa region.

On 3 April 2016, Robinson died from lung cancer at the age of 69 in Harare.

== See also ==
- List of Test cricket umpires
- List of One Day International cricket umpires
