= Mluleki Nkala =

Zimbabwean cricketer (born 1981)

Cricket information
- Batting: Right-handed
- Bowling: Right-arm fast-medium

Career statistics
Competition	Test	ODI
Matches	10	50
Runs scored	187	324
Batting average	14.38	10.80
100s/50s	0/0	0/0
Top score	47	47
Balls bowled	1452	1,582
Wickets	11	22
Bowling average	66.09	71.36
5 wickets in innings	0	0
10 wickets in match	0	0
Best bowling	3/82	3/12
Catches/stumpings	4/–	6/–
- Source: Cricinfo, 28 December 2015

Mluleki Luke Nkala (born 1 April 1981) is a Zimbabwean international cricketer. He took the wicket of Sachin Tendulkar with his second ball in senior international cricket in 1999. He also took five wickets against England in a test match in Nottingham in 2000.

Educated at Falcon College, he was a member of the Zimbabwean Test and One Day International teams, Nkala also captained Zimbabwe in three Under-19 One Day Internationals in 1999–2000. He has coached at Edinburgh Cricket Club in Melbourne, Australia and in early 2010, Nkala returned to Zimbabwe to play professional cricket with the Mid-West Rhinos franchise. He played his last first class match in 2014.
