= Grant Flower =

Zimbabwean cricketer (born 1970)

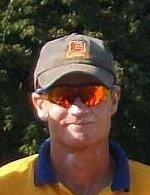
- Flower in 2005

Personal information
- Born: 20 December 1970 (age 55); Salisbury, Rhodesia
- Nickname: Flower Power
- Batting: Right-handed
- Bowling: Slow left arm orthodox
- Role: Opening batsman
- Relatives: Andy Flower (brother)

International information
- National side: Zimbabwe (1992–2010)
- Test debut (cap 7): 18 October 1992 v India
- Last Test: 26 February 2004 v Bangladesh
- ODI debut (cap 27): 25 October 1992 v India
- Last ODI: 17 October 2010 v South Africa
- ODI shirt no.: 68

Domestic team information
- Years: Team
- 1994/95–2003/04: Mashonaland
- 2002: Leicestershire
- 2005–2010: Essex
- 2010/11: Mashonaland Eagles

Career statistics
Competition	Test	ODI	FC	LA
Matches	67	221	188	366
Runs scored	3,457	6,571	10,898	10,758
Batting average	29.54	33.52	37.19	34.92
100s/50s	6/15	6/40	23/58	13/69
Top score	201*	142*	243*	148*
Balls bowled	3,378	5,462	12,511	8,962
Wickets	25	104	166	188
Bowling average	61.48	40.62	33.76	35.77
5 wickets in innings	0	0	3	0
10 wickets in match	0	0	0	0
Best bowling	4/41	4/32	7/31	4/32
Catches/stumpings	43/–	86/–	174/–	140/–
- Source: Cricinfo, 6 January 2022

Grant William Flower (born 20 December 1970) is a Zimbabwean cricket coach and former cricketer. He has been the batting coach of the Sri Lanka cricket team, Pakistan cricket team, and Sussex.

He is rated among the best Zimbabwean cricketers in history for his consistent left arm spin and fine batting skills. He was a fitness fanatic who spent hours in the gym, and was also regarded as a brilliant fielder usually positioned in the gully. "Flower Power", the combination of Grant and his brother Andy Flower, was the mainstay of Zimbabwean batting for a decade. He was his team's most successful opening batsman who played the role of anchorman, with strokeplayers coming in down the order.

He played a lead role in, arguably, Zimbabwe's finest Test victory, against a strong Pakistan side. He would show a liking for the Pakistani side over his career, averaging over 40 against them and scoring 3 centuries including an unbeaten 201. In July 2014, he was appointed as batting coach of the Pakistan cricket team for a period of two years but went onto serve in the position until August 2019.

He was also the first batsman to have carried his bat across two different formats and also the only batsman to have carried out his bat in both ODIs as well as in tests.

== Early days ==
Grant Flower was born in Salisbury, Rhodesia and was educated along with his brother Andy at North Park School where they were the best players in their age groups. Although always an allrounder, he bowled seamers in his early days and his bowling was rated more than his batting. He changed to spin bowling in high school. Quite clearly, Flower is part of the famous talent production line from St George's College, which also includes England cricketers Sam Curran and Tom Curran as well as New Zealand international Colin de Grandhomme among a plethora of other internationally capped players.

In the summer of 1990–91 his elevation to a professional cricketer was confirmed when he was employed by the Zimbabwe Cricket Union. His debut first-class game for Zimbabwe came against England A. In his second match he opened the innings and was rewarded with a fifty adding what would be the first of many century partnerships with his brother Andy.

At just 19, Flower was part of the 1990 ICC tournament where the winner would qualify for the World Cup. Zimbabwe would go on to win the competition with Grant Flower scoring heavily in the early games. Had they not won the competition it is likely that Zimbabwe would not have made their rise to Test cricket, at least not until much later. Grant Flower missed out on the 1992 World Cup due to injury. In 1990, Grant spent a season in England with Winscombe Cricket Club, followed by Widnes Cricket Club in the Manchester and District Cricket Association in 1993. He also spent a season at Barnt Green Cricket Club of the Birmingham League in 1995.

== International career ==
=== Test career ===
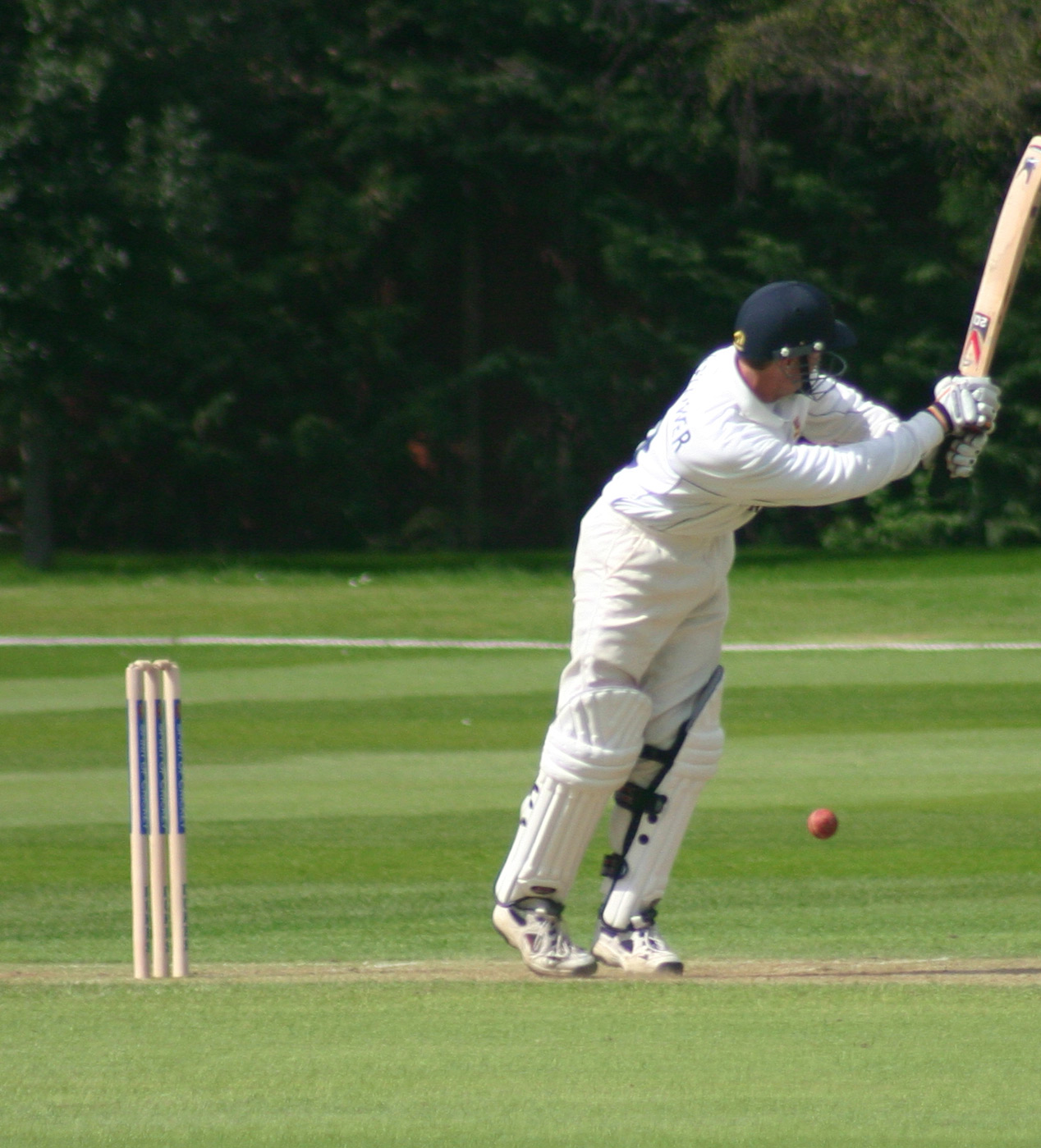
Flower batting for Essex against Cambridge UCCE, April 2005

After the World Cup Zimbabwe were promoted to Test status and Flower was unanimously selected to play against the Indian team for the Inaugural Test match on 18 October 1992. On a flat pitch, he opened the batting for his country and dominated in a 100 run opening stand. He would go on to score 82, falling short of a century on Test debut. Zimbabwe again met the Indian team this time on their home turf and again fell just short of a maiden Test century when he fell for 96.

Pakistan toured Zimbabwe in 1995 and in the 1st Test Flower finally scored his maiden Test century. Not content, he went on to register double hundred. He hit only 12 boundaries and faced 523 balls as Zimbabwe scored a massive 4/544 declared. His innings would help Zimbabwe to win their first Test match as they won by a convincing Innings and 64 Runs. He would continue to haunt the Pakistani side, scoring his second Test century at Sheikhupura Stadium in Pakistan.

In 1997 Flower became the first Zimbabwean to score a century in both innings of a Test match. Playing against New Zealand in Harare, he scored 104 and 151. A year later he scored his 5th Test century, an innings of 156 not out at Queens Sports Club against Pakistan. He would suffer a form slump after that innings, not scoring a 99 for 33 innings including 6 ducks. On 25 November 2000 he ended his slump with a fine 106 against India and would go on to score 4 50's in his next 6 innings.

=== One Day International career ===
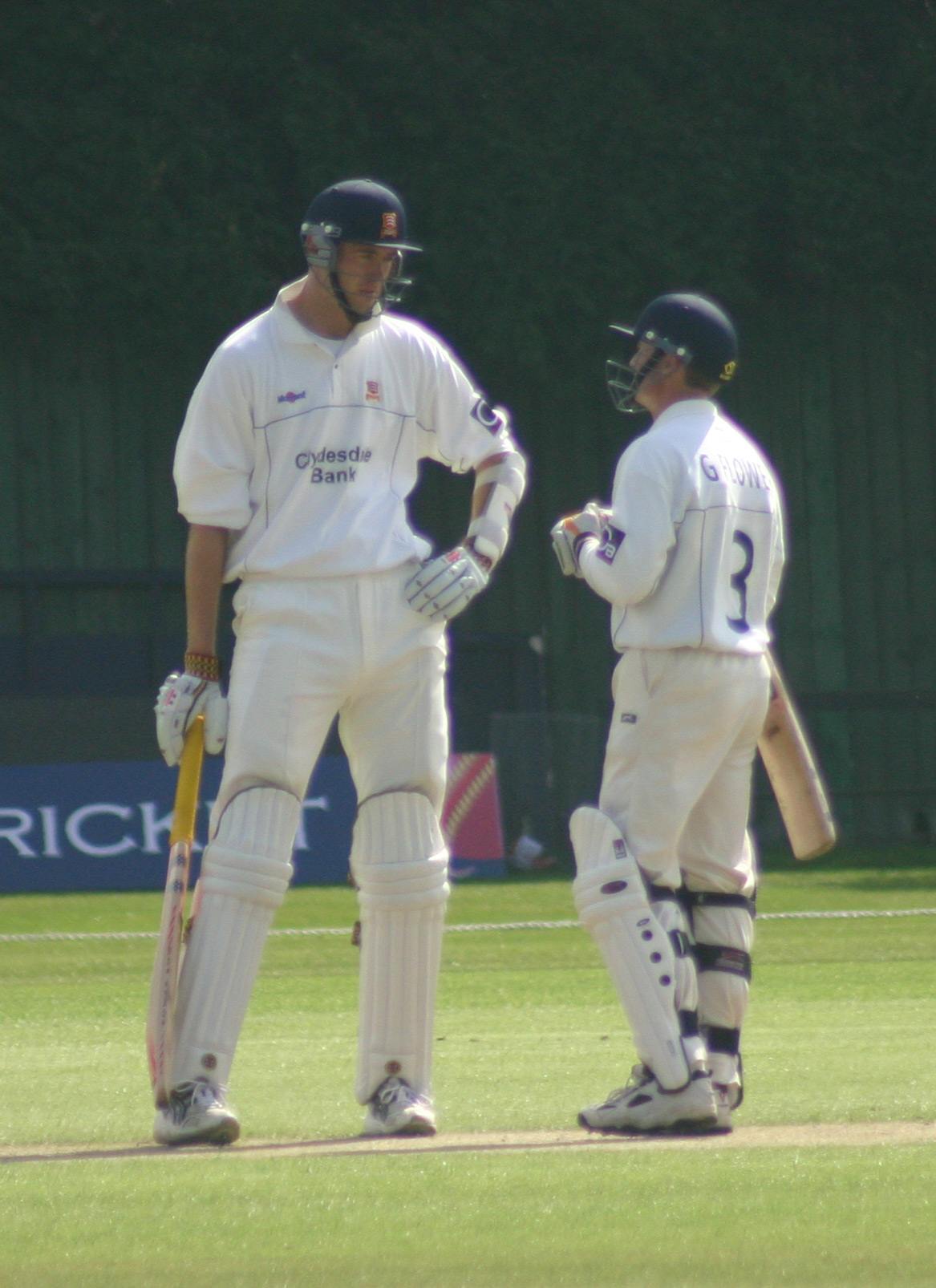
Flower (on the right) with Essex teammate Will Jefferson.

By the end of his ODI career, Flower had taken more wickets than any other Zimbabwean bowler except Heath Streak. His ODI statistics make better reading than his Test statistics. He would score 6 ODI tons and had it not been for the nervous nineties may have had many more. 9 times he was either unbeaten or dismissed in the 90's. One of his most memorable centuries would come in the final of a one-day triangular tournament in Bangladesh. Playing against Kenya he smashed an 82 ball century and finished with 140, just 2 short of the national record at the time. He holds the record for taking the most catches as fielder for Zimbabwe in ODI history(86)

Flower more importantly was the first batsman to carry his bat right through the completed innings of an ODI. He also holds the unique record for being the only batsman in ODI cricket to have carried his bat in a One Day International match in a winning cause.

=== Late career ===
In 2004 he announced his retirement from international cricket. This was due largely to the dispute between the rebels and the Zimbabwean Cricket Union. He signed a contract with Essex as a Kolpak player where he played alongside his brother Andy. There was some grumbling amongst Essex supporters at his signing, but this appeared to die down after his first season, when he topped the Essex 2005 List-A batting averages and was third in the number of wickets taken.

=== Return ===
Following another fine season for Essex which turned out to be his last season of county cricket, Flower was handed a shock recall to the Zimbabwe team for the tour of South Africa. He was expected to combine playing duties with his role of batting coach of the national side and was in contention to play in the 2011 Cricket World Cup held in India. He made his international return in October 2010 during the first ODI of the three-match series against South Africa.

== Coaching career ==
He was appointed as the batting coach of Zimbabwe in October 2010 and served in the position until 2013. In May 2014, he was appointed as the batting coach of the Pakistan cricket team. His contract was ended in August 2019 by PCB after Pakistan's dismal performance at the 2019 Cricket World Cup. He was instrumental in Pakistan's triumph at the 2017 ICC Champions Trophy which Flower himself considers as his personal achievement. He was appointed as the head coach of Rangpur Riders for the 2019–20 Bangladesh Premier League.

In December 2019, he was appointed as the batting coach of Sri Lanka for a contract of two years. On 8 July 2021, he was tested positive for COVID-19 on his return to Sri Lanka from England following the limited overs series between Sri Lanka and England. It was revealed that Flower is under stable position along with Sri Lanka cricket data analyst GT Niroshan.
