= 2001 Khaleej Times Trophy =

Khaleej Times Trophy 2001-02
- Date: 26 October – 4 November 2001
- Location: United Arab Emirates
- Result: Pakistan won the 2001 Khaleej Times Trophy
- Player of the series: Mahela Jayawardene (Sri)
Teams
Pakistan	Sri Lanka	Zimbabwe
Captains
Waqar Younis	Sanath Jayasuriya	Brian Murphy
Most runs
Shahid Afridi (194)	Mahela Jayawardene (252)	Grant Flower (138)
Most wickets
Shoaib Akhtar (9)	Muttiah Muralitharan (7)	Gary Brent (7)

The 2001 Khaleej Times Trophy was a One Day International (ODI) cricket tournament held in the United Arab Emirates in late October 2001. It was a tri-nation series between the national representative cricket teams of the Pakistan, Sri Lanka and Zimbabwe. The Pakistanis won the tournament by defeating the Sri Lanka by 5 wickets in the final. All matches were held in Sharjah Cricket Stadium, Sharjah.

== Squads ==
Pakistan	Sri Lanka	Zimbabwe
Waqar Younis (c); Shahid Afridi; Shoaib Akhtar; Saeed Anwar; Danish Kaneria; Younis Khan; Naved Latif; Rashid Latif; Azhar Mahmood; Shoaib Malik; Abdul Razzaq; Taufeeq Umar; Mohammad Yousuf	Sanath Jayasuriya (c); Russell Arnold; Marvan Atapattu; Charitha Buddhika; Kumar Dharmasena; Dilhara Fernando; Avishka Gunawardene; Mahela Jayawardene; Romesh Kaluwitharana; Dulip Liyanage; Muttiah Muralitharan; Prabath Nissanka; Chaminda Vaas	Brian Murphy (c); Gary Brent; Stuart Carlisle; Dion Ebrahim; Sean Ervine; Grant Flower; Andy Flower; Travis Friend; Trevor Gripper; Douglas Marillier; Henry Olonga; Mluleki Nkala; Heath Streak; Craig Wishart

== Matches ==
=== 1st ODI ===
26 October (D/N)
Scorecard

Sri Lanka; 256/6 (50 overs)	v	Zimbabwe; 193 (50 overs)
Marvan Atapattu 92 (110); Sean Ervine 2/46 (9 overs)		Sean Ervine 47 (67); Charitha Buddhika 5/67 (9 overs)

Sri Lanka won by 6 wickets
Sharjah Cricket Association Stadium, Sharjah
Umpires: Rudi Koertzen (SA) and George Sharp (Eng)
Player of the match: Charitha Buddhika (Sri)

- Sri Lanka won the toss and elected to bat.
- Charitha Buddhika (Sri) made his ODI debut.
- This was Zimbabwe's 12th consecutive defeat in ODIs.
- Points: Sri Lanka 5, Zimbabwe 0.

=== 2nd ODI ===
27 October (D/N)
Scorecard

Pakistan; 176 (46.2 overs)	v	Sri Lanka; 177/3 (38.1 overs)
Mohammad Yousuf 47 (72); Dilhara Fernando 3/43 (7 overs)		Avishka Gunawardene 88 (123); Shoaib Akhtar 2/39 (7.1 overs)

Sri Lanka won by 7 wickets
Sharjah Cricket Association Stadium, Sharjah
Umpires: Rudi Koertzen (SA) and Eddie Nicholls (Win)
Player of the match: Avishka Gunawardene (Sri)

- Pakistan won the toss and elected to bat.
- Taufeeq Umar (Pak) and Prabath Nissanka (Sri) both made their ODI debuts.
- Points: Sri Lanka 5, Pakistan 0.

=== 3rd ODI ===
28 October (D/N)
Scorecard

Pakistan; 279/6 (50 overs)	v	Zimbabwe; 173 (39.1 overs)
Shahid Afridi 67 (81); Grant Flower 1/22 (4 overs)		Andy Flower 43 (71); Shoaib Malik 3/42 (7 overs)

Pakistan won by 106 runs
Sharjah Cricket Association Stadium, Sharjah
Umpires: George Sharp (Eng) and Eddie Nicholls (Win)
Player of the match: Shahid Afridi (Pak)

- Pakistan won the toss and elected to bat.
- Trevor Gripper (Zim) made his ODI debut.
- Points: Pakistan 5, Zimbabwe 0.

=== 4th ODI ===
30 October (D/N)
Scorecard

Sri Lanka; 250 (49.4 overs)	v	Zimbabwe; 171/8 (50 overs)
Mahela Jayawardene 63 (78); Heath Streak 4/59 (10 overs)		Douglas Marillier 52 (68); Kumar Dharmasena 3/26 (10 overs)

Sri Lanka won by 79 runs
Sharjah Cricket Association Stadium, Sharjah
Umpires: Rudi Koertzen (SA) and Eddie Nicholls (Win)
Player of the match: Mahela Jayawardene (Sri)

- Sri Lanka won the toss and elected to bat.
- Points: Sri Lanka 5, Zimbabwe 0.

=== 5th ODI ===
31 October (D/N)
Scorecard

Pakistan; 261/9 (50 overs)	v	Zimbabwe; 232 (46.2 overs)
Younis Khan 59 (81); Sean Ervine 3/29 (7 overs)		Grant Flower 91 (128); Wasim Akram 3/19 (9 overs)

Pakistan won by 29 runs
Sharjah Cricket Association Stadium, Sharjah
Umpires: George Sharp (Eng) and Rudi Koertzen (SA)
Player of the match: Grant Flower (Zim)

- Pakistan won the toss and elected to bat.
- Danish Kaneria and Naved Latif (both Pak) made their ODI debuts.
- Points: Pakistan 4, Zimbabwe 0.

=== 6th ODI ===
2 November (D/N)
Scorecard

Sri Lanka; 272/9 (50 overs)	v	Pakistan; 273/3 (49.2 overs)
Mahela Jayawardene 84 (83); Shoaib Akhtar 3/45 (10 overs)		Inzamam-ul-Haq 118* (124); Charitha Buddhika 1/35 (10 overs)

Pakistan won by 7 wickets
Sharjah Cricket Association Stadium, Sharjah
Umpires: George Sharp (Eng) and Eddie Nicholls (Win)
Player of the match: Naved Latif (Pak)

- Sri Lanka won the toss and elected to bat.
- Sanath Jayasuriya (Sri) passed 9,000 ODI runs, becoming third Sri Lanka to do so.
- Naved Latif (Pak) made his maiden ODI century.
- Inzamam-ul-Haq (Pak) made his 8th ODI century.
- Points: Pakistan 4, Sri Lanka 0.

=== Final ===
4 November (D/N)
Scorecard

Sri Lanka; 173 (44.2 overs)	v	Pakistan; 177/5 (43.4 overs)
Russell Arnold 84 (83); Waqar Younis 3/31 (8.2 overs)		Mohammad Yousuf 40 (69); Muttiah Muralitharan 3/22 (10 overs)

Pakistan won by 5 wickets
Sharjah Cricket Association Stadium, Sharjah
Umpires: George Sharp (Eng) and Rudi Koertzen (SA)
Player of the match: Waqar Younis (Pak)

- Sri Lanka won the toss and elected to bat.
- Pakistan won the 2001/02 Khaleej Times Trophy
