= International cricket in 2001–02 =

Cricket tournament season

The 2001–02 international cricket season was from September 2001 to April 2002. This season featured 43 Test matches, 88 One-day Internationals, 5 first class matches, 5 List A matches, 2 Women's Test matches and 20 Women's One Day Internationals.

== Season overview ==
International tours
Start date	Home team	Away team	Results [Matches]			
Start date	Home team	Away team	Test	ODI	FC	LA
23 September 2001	Zimbabwe	South Africa	0–1 [2]	0–3 [3]	—	—
3 October 2001	Zimbabwe	England	—	0–5 [5]	—	—
16 October 2001	Australia	New Zealand	0–0 [3]	—	—	—
29 October 2001	South Africa	India	1–0 [2]	—	1–0 [1]	—
1 November 2001	Sri Lanka	West Indies	3–0 [3]	—	—	—
8 November 2001	Bangladesh	Zimbabwe	0–1 [2]	0–3 [3]	—	—
18 November 2001	India	England	1–0 [3]	3–3 [6]	—	—
5 December 2001	Australia	South Africa	3–0 [3]	—	—	—
7 December 2001	New Zealand	Bangladesh	2–0 [2]	—	—	—
21 December 2001	Sri Lanka	Zimbabwe	3–0 [3]	—	—	—
9 January 2002	Bangladesh	Pakistan	0–2 [2]	0–3 [3]	—	—
26 January 2002	Sri Lanka	Kenya	—	—	3–0 [3]	1–2 [3]
31 January 2002	(United Arab Emirates) Pakistan vs West Indies		2–0 [2]	2–1 [3]	—	—
8 February 2002	New Zealand	England	1–1 [3]	3–2 [5]	—	—
15 February 2002	India	Zimbabwe	2–0 [2]	3–2 [5]	—	—
17 February 2002	South Africa	Australia	1–2 [3]	1–5 [7]	—	—
22 March 2002	South Africa	India	—	—	1–0 [2]	1–1 [2]
International tournaments
Start date	Tournament				Winners	
5 October 2001	(South Africa) 2001 Standard Bank Triangular Tournament				South Africa	
26 October 2001	(United Arab Emirates) 2001 Khaleej Times Trophy				Pakistan	
8 December 2001	(Sri Lanka) 2001 LG Abans Triangular Series				Sri Lanka	
11 January 2002	(Australia) 2001–02 VB Series				South Africa	
8 April 2002	(United Arab Emirates) 2002 Sharjah Cup				Pakistan	
Women's International tours
Start date	Home team	Away team	Results [Matches]			
Start date	Home team	Away team	Test		ODI	
4 Jan 2002	India	England	0–0 [1]		5–0 [5]	
20 Jan 2002	Sri Lanka	Pakistan	—		6–0 [6]	
16 Feb 2002	Australia	New Zealand	—		3–0 [3]	
27 Feb 2002	New Zealand	Australia	—		1–2 [3]	
7 Mar 2002	South Africa	India	0–1 [1]		2–1 [4]	

== September ==
=== South Africa in Zimbabwe ===
Test series
No.	Date	Home captain	Away captain	Venue	Result
Test 1562	07-11 Sep 2001	Heath Streak	Shaun Pollock	Harare Sports Club, Harare	South Africa won by 9 wickets
Test 1563	14-18 Sep 2001	Heath Streak	Shaun Pollock	Queens Sports Club, Bulawayo	Match drawn
ODI series
No.	Date	Home captain	Away captain	Venue	Result
ODI 1748	23 Sep 2001	Heath Streak	Shaun Pollock	Queens Sports Club, Bulawayo	South Africa won by 153 runs
ODI 1749	29 Sep 2001	Guy Whittall	Shaun Pollock	Harare Sports Club, Harare	South Africa won by 148 runs
ODI 1750	30 Sep 2001	Guy Whittall	Shaun Pollock	Harare Sports Club, Harare	South Africa won by 6 wickets

== October ==
=== England in Zimbabwe ===
ODI series
No.	Date	Home captain	Away captain	Venue	Result
ODI 1751	3 October 2001	Guy Whittall	Nasser Hussain	Harare Sports Club, Harare	England won by 5 wickets
ODI 1753	6 October 2001	Heath Streak	Nasser Hussain	Harare Sports Club, Harare	England won by 8 wickets
ODI 1754	7 October 2001	Heath Streak	Nasser Hussain	Harare Sports Club, Harare	England won by 4 wickets
ODI 1756	10 October 2001	Alistair Campbell	Marcus Trescothick	Harare Sports Club, Harare	England won by 70 runs
ODI 1759	13 October 2001	Alistair Campbell	Nasser Hussain	Queens Sports Club, Bulawayo	England won by 7 wickets

=== 2001 Standard Bank Triangular Tournament ===
Group stage
No.	Date	Team 1	Captain 1	Team 2	Captain 2	Venue	Result
ODI 1752	5 October	South Africa	Shaun Pollock	India	Saurav Ganguly	New Wanderers Stadium, Johannesburg	South Africa by 6 wickets
ODI 1755	7 October	South Africa	Shaun Pollock	Kenya	Maurice Odumbe	Willowmoore Park, Benoni	South Africa by 7 wickets
ODI 1757	10 October	South Africa	Shaun Pollock	India	Saurav Ganguly	SuperSport Park, Centurion	India by 41 runs
ODI 1758	12 October	India	Saurav Ganguly	Kenya	Maurice Odumbe	Goodyear Park, Bloemfontein	India by 10 wickets
ODI 1755	14 October	South Africa	Shaun Pollock	Kenya	Maurice Odumbe	De Beers Diamond Oval, Kimberley	South Africa by 9 wickets
ODI 1761	17 October	India	Saurav Ganguly	Kenya	Steve Tikolo	Crusaders Ground, Port Elizabeth	Kenya by 70 runs
ODI 1757	19 October	South Africa	Shaun Pollock	India	Saurav Ganguly	Buffalo Park, East London	South Africa by 46 runs
ODI 1763	22 October	South Africa	Shaun Pollock	Kenya	Steve Tikolo	Newlands Cricket Ground, Cape Town	South Africa by 208 runs
ODI 1764	24 October	India	Saurav Ganguly	Kenya	Maurice Odumbe	Boland Bank Park, Paarl	India by 186 runs
Final
ODI 1757	26 October	South Africa	Shaun Pollock	India	Saurav Ganguly	Kingsmead Cricket Ground, Durban	South Africa by 6 wickets

=== India in South Africa ===
Test series
No.	Date	Home captain	Away captain	Venue	Result
Test 1564	3–6 November	Shaun Pollock	Saurav Ganguly	Goodyear Park, Bloemfontein	South Africa by 9 wickets
Test 1569	16–20 November	Shaun Pollock	Saurav Ganguly	Crusaders Ground, Port Elizabeth	Match drawn

=== New Zealand in Australia ===
2001 Trans-Tasman Trophy - Test series
No.	Date	Home captain	Away captain	Venue	Result
Test 1565	8–12 November	Steve Waugh	Stephen Fleming	The Gabba, Brisbane	Match drawn
Test 1571	22–26 November	Steve Waugh	Stephen Fleming	Bellerive Oval, Hobart	Match drawn
Test 1573	30 Nov–4 December	Steve Waugh	Stephen Fleming	WACA Ground, Perth	Match drawn

=== 2001 Khaleej Times Trophy ===
Group stage
No.	Date	Team 1	Captain 1	Team 2	Captain 2	Venue	Result
ODI 1765	26 October	Sri Lanka	Sanath Jayasuriya	Zimbabwe	Brian Murphy	Sharjah Cricket Association Stadium, Sharjah	Sri Lanka by 53 runs
ODI 1767	27 October	Pakistan	Waqar Younis	Sri Lanka	Sanath Jayasuriya	Sharjah Cricket Association Stadium, Sharjah	Sri Lanka by 7 wickets
ODI 1768	28 October	Pakistan	Waqar Younis	Zimbabwe	Brian Murphy	Sharjah Cricket Association Stadium, Sharjah	Pakistan by 106 runs
ODI 1769	30 October	Sri Lanka	Sanath Jayasuriya	Zimbabwe	Brian Murphy	Sharjah Cricket Association Stadium, Sharjah	Sri Lanka by 79 runs
ODI 1770	31 October	Pakistan	Waqar Younis	Zimbabwe	Brian Murphy	Sharjah Cricket Association Stadium, Sharjah	Pakistan by 29 runs
ODI 1771	2 November	Pakistan	Waqar Younis	Sri Lanka	Sanath Jayasuriya	Sharjah Cricket Association Stadium, Sharjah	Pakistan by 7 wickets
Final
ODI 1772	4 November	Pakistan	Waqar Younis	Sri Lanka	Sanath Jayasuriya	Sharjah Cricket Association Stadium, Sharjah	Pakistan by 5 wickets

== November ==
=== West Indies in Sri Lanka ===
Test series
No.	Date	Home captain	Away captain	Venue	Result
Test 1567	13–17 November	Sanath Jayasuriya	Carl Hooper	Galle International Stadium, Galle	Sri Lanka by 10 wickets
Test 1570	21–25 November	Sanath Jayasuriya	Carl Hooper	Asgiriya Stadium, Kandy	Sri Lanka by 131 runs
Test 1572	29 Nov–1 December	Sanath Jayasuriya	Carl Hooper	Sinhalese Sports Club Ground, Colombo	Sri Lanka by 10 wickets

=== Zimbabwe in Bangladesh ===
Test series
No.	Date	Home captain	Away captain	Venue	Result
Test 1566	8–12 November	Naimur Rahman	Brian Murphy	Bangabandhu National Stadium, Dhaka	Match drawn
Test 1568	15–19 November	Naimur Rahman	Stuart Carlisle	Chittagong Stadium, Chittagong	Zimbabwe by 8 wickets
ODI series
No.	Date	Home captain	Away captain	Venue	Result
ODI 1773	23 November	Khaled Mashud	Stuart Carlisle	Chittagong Stadium, Chittagong	Zimbabwe by 5 wickets
ODI 1774	25 November	Khaled Mashud	Stuart Carlisle	Chittagong Stadium, Chittagong	Zimbabwe by 42 runs
ODI 1775	26 November	Khaled Mashud	Stuart Carlisle	Bangabandhu National Stadium, Dhaka	Zimbabwe by 7 wickets

=== England in India ===
Test series
No.	Date	Home captain	Away captain	Venue	Result
Test 1574	3–6 December	Saurav Ganguly	Nasser Hussain	Punjab Cricket Association Stadium, Mohali	India by 10 wickets
Test 1575	11–15 December	Saurav Ganguly	Nasser Hussain	Sardar Patel Stadium, Ahmedabad	Match drawn
Test 1578	19–23 December	Saurav Ganguly	Nasser Hussain	M Chinnaswamy Stadium, Bangalore	Match drawn
ODI series
No.	Date	Home captain	Away captain	Venue	Result
ODI 1788	19 January	Saurav Ganguly	Nasser Hussain	Eden Gardens, Kolkata	India by 22 runs
ODI 1792	22 January	Saurav Ganguly	Nasser Hussain	Barabati Stadium, Cuttack	England by 16 runs
ODI 1795	25 January	Anil Kumble	Nasser Hussain	MA Chidambaram Stadium, Chennai	India by 4 wickets
ODI 1798	28 January	Saurav Ganguly	Nasser Hussain	Green Park Stadium, Kanpur	India by 8 wickets
ODI 1800	31 January	Saurav Ganguly	Nasser Hussain	Feroz Shah Kotla, Delhi	England by 2 runs
ODI 1803	3 February	Saurav Ganguly	Nasser Hussain	Wankhede Stadium, Mumbai	England by 5 runs

== December ==
=== South Africa in Australia ===
Test series
No.	Date	Home captain	Away captain	Venue	Result
Test 1576	14–18 December	Steve Waugh	Shaun Pollock	Adelaide Oval, Adelaide	Australia by 246 runs
Test 1580	26–29 December	Steve Waugh	Shaun Pollock	Melbourne Cricket Ground, Melbourne	Australia by 9 wickets
Test 1582	2–5 January	Steve Waugh	Shaun Pollock	Sydney Cricket Ground, Sydney	Australia by 10 wickets

=== Bangladesh in New Zealand ===
Test series
No.	Date	Home captain	Away captain	Venue	Result
Test 1577	18–22 December	Stephen Fleming	Khaled Mashud	WestpacTrust Park, Hamilton	New Zealand by an innings and 52 runs
Test 1579	26–29 December	Stephen Fleming	Khaled Mashud	Basin Reserve, Wellington	New Zealand by an innings and 74 runs

=== 2001 LG Abans Triangular Series ===
Group stage
No.	Date	Team 1	Captain 1	Team 2	Captain 2	Venue	Result
ODI 1776	8 December	Sri Lanka	Sanath Jayasuriya	Zimbabwe	Stuart Carlisle	Sinhalese Sports Club Ground, Colombo	Sri Lanka by 9 wickets
ODI 1777	9 December	West Indies	Carl Hooper	Zimbabwe	Stuart Carlisle	Sinhalese Sports Club Ground, Colombo	Zimbabwe by 4 wickets
ODI 1776	11 December	Sri Lanka	Sanath Jayasuriya	West Indies	Carl Hooper	R Premadasa Stadium, Colombo	West Indies by 49 runs
ODI 1779	12 December	Sri Lanka	Sanath Jayasuriya	Zimbabwe	Stuart Carlisle	R Premadasa Stadium, Colombo	Sri Lanka by 59 runs
ODI 1780	15 December	Sri Lanka	Sanath Jayasuriya	West Indies	Carl Hooper	Asgiriya Stadium, Kandy	Sri Lanka by 8 wickets
ODI 1781	16 December	West Indies	Carl Hooper	Zimbabwe	Stuart Carlisle	Asgiriya Stadium, Kandy	West Indies by 8 wickets
Final
ODI 1782	19 December	Sri Lanka	Sanath Jayasuriya	West Indies	Carl Hooper	R Premadasa Stadium, Colombo	Sri Lanka by 34 runs (D/L)

=== Zimbabwe in Sri Lanka ===
Test series
No.	Date	Home captain	Away captain	Venue	Result
Test 1581	27–31 December	Sanath Jayasuriya	Stuart Carlisle	Sinhalese Sports Club Ground, Colombo	Sri Lanka by an innings and 166 runs
Test 1583	4–7 January	Sanath Jayasuriya	Stuart Carlisle	Asgiriya Stadium, Kandy	Sri Lanka by an innings and 94 runs
Test 1585	12–15 January	Sanath Jayasuriya	Stuart Carlisle	Galle International Stadium, Galle	Sri Lanka by 315 runs

== January ==
=== Pakistan in Bangladesh ===
Test series
No.	Date	Home captain	Away captain	Venue	Result
Test 1584	9–11 January	Khaled Mashud	Waqar Younis	Bangabandhu National Stadium, Dhaka	Pakistan by an innings and 178 runs
Test 1586	16–18 January	Khaled Mashud	Waqar Younis	Chittagong Stadium, Chittagong	Pakistan by an innings and 169 runs
ODI series
No.	Date	Home captain	Away captain	Venue	Result
ODI 1790	22 January	Khaled Mashud	Waqar Younis	Chittagong Stadium, Chittagong	Pakistan by 49 runs
ODI 1793	24 January	Khaled Mashud	Waqar Younis	Bangabandhu National Stadium, Dhaka	Pakistan by 72 runs
ODI 1794	25 January	Khaled Mashud	Waqar Younis	Bangabandhu National Stadium, Dhaka	Pakistan by 8 wickets

=== 2001–02 VB Series ===
Group stage
No.	Date	Team 1	Captain 1	Team 2	Captain 2	Venue	Result
ODI 1783	11 January	Australia	Steve Waugh	New Zealand	Stephen Fleming	Melbourne Cricket Ground, Melbourne	New Zealand by 23 runs
ODI 1783	13 January	Australia	Steve Waugh	South Africa	Shaun Pollock	Melbourne Cricket Ground, Melbourne	South Africa by 4 wickets
ODI 1785	13 January	New Zealand	Stephen Fleming	South Africa	Shaun Pollock	Bellerive Oval, Hobart	South Africa by 26 runs
ODI 1786	17 January	Australia	Steve Waugh	New Zealand	Stephen Fleming	Sydney Cricket Ground, Sydney	New Zealand by 23 runs
ODI 1787	19 January	New Zealand	Chris Cairns	South Africa	Shaun Pollock	The Gabba, Brisbane	New Zealand by 4 wickets
ODI 1789	20 January	Australia	Steve Waugh	South Africa	Shaun Pollock	The Gabba, Brisbane	Australia by 27 runs
ODI 1791	22 January	Australia	Steve Waugh	South Africa	Shaun Pollock	Sydney Cricket Ground, Sydney	Australia by 8 wickets
ODI 1796	26 January	Australia	Steve Waugh	New Zealand	Stephen Fleming	Adelaide Oval, Adelaide	New Zealand by 77 runs
ODI 1797	27 January	New Zealand	Stephen Fleming	South Africa	Shaun Pollock	Adelaide Oval, Adelaide	South Africa by 93 runs
ODI 1799	29 January	Australia	Steve Waugh	New Zealand	Stephen Fleming	Melbourne Cricket Ground, Melbourne	Australia by 2 wickets
ODI 1801	1 February	New Zealand	Stephen Fleming	South Africa	Shaun Pollock	WACA Ground, Perth	South Africa by 67 runs
ODI 1802	3 February	Australia	Steve Waugh	South Africa	Shaun Pollock	WACA Ground, Perth	Australia by 33 runs
Finals
ODI 1804	6 February	New Zealand	Stephen Fleming	South Africa	Shaun Pollock	Melbourne Cricket Ground, Melbourne	South Africa by 8 wickets
ODI 1805	8 February	New Zealand	Stephen Fleming	South Africa	Shaun Pollock	Sydney Cricket Ground, Sydney	South Africa by 6 wickets (D/L)

=== Pakistan vs West Indies in U.A.E ===
Test series
No.	Date	Home captain	Away captain	Venue	Result
Test 1587	31 Jan–4 February	Waqar Younis	Carl Hooper	Sharjah Cricket Association Stadium, Sharjah	Pakistan by 170 runs
Test 1588	7–10 February	Waqar Younis	Carl Hooper	Sharjah Cricket Association Stadium, Sharjah	Pakistan by 244 runs
ODI series
No.	Date	Home captain	Away captain	Venue	Result
ODI 1807	14 February	Waqar Younis	Carl Hooper	Sharjah Cricket Association Stadium, Sharjah	Pakistan by 4 wickets
ODI 1808	15 February	Waqar Younis	Carl Hooper	Sharjah Cricket Association Stadium, Sharjah	Pakistan by 51 runs
ODI 1810	17 February	Waqar Younis	Carl Hooper	Sharjah Cricket Association Stadium, Sharjah	West Indies by 110 runs

== February ==
=== Zimbabwe in India ===
Test series
No.	Date	Home captain	Away captain	Venue	Result
Test 1589	21–25 February	Saurav Ganguly	Stuart Carlisle	Vidarbha Cricket Association Ground, Nagpur	India by an innings and 101 runs
Test 1589	21–25 February	Saurav Ganguly	Stuart Carlisle	Feroz Shah Kotla, Delhi	India by 4 wickets
ODI series
No.	Date	Home captain	Away captain	Venue	Result
ODI 1814	7 March	Saurav Ganguly	Stuart Carlisle	Nahar Singh Stadium, Faridabad	Zimbabwe by 1 wicket
ODI 1815	10 March	Saurav Ganguly	Stuart Carlisle	Punjab Cricket Association Stadium, Mohali	India by 64 runs
ODI 1816	13 March	Saurav Ganguly	Stuart Carlisle	Jawaharlal Nehru Stadium, Kochi	Zimbabwe by 6 wickets
ODI 1817	16 March	Saurav Ganguly	Stuart Carlisle	Lal Bahadur Shastri Stadium, Hyderabad	India by 5 wickets
ODI 1818	19 March	Saurav Ganguly	Stuart Carlisle	Nehru Stadium, Guwahati	India by 101 runs

=== England in New Zealand ===
ODI series
No.	Date	Home captain	Away captain	Venue	Result
ODI 1806	13 February	Stephen Fleming	Nasser Hussain	Jade Stadium, Christchurch	New Zealand by 4 wickets
ODI 1809	16 February	Stephen Fleming	Nasser Hussain	WestpacTrust Stadium, Wellington	New Zealand by 155 runs
ODI 1811	20 February	Stephen Fleming	Nasser Hussain	McLean Park, Napier	England by 43 runs
ODI 1812	23 February	Stephen Fleming	Nasser Hussain	Eden Park, Auckland	England by 33 runs (D/L)
ODI 1813	26 February	Stephen Fleming	Nasser Hussain	Carisbrook, Dunedin	New Zealand by 5 wickets
Test series
No.	Date	Home captain	Away captain	Venue	Result
Test 1594	13–16 March	Stephen Fleming	Nasser Hussain	Jade Stadium, Christchurch	England by 98 runs
Test 1596	21–25 March	Stephen Fleming	Nasser Hussain	Basin Reserve, Wellington	Match drawn
Test 1597	30 March-1 April	Stephen Fleming	Nasser Hussain	Eden Park, Auckland	New Zealand by 78 runs

=== Australia in South Africa ===
Test series
No.	Date	Home captain	Away captain	Venue	Result
Test 1590	22–24 February	Mark Boucher	Steve Waugh	New Wanderers Stadium, Johannesburg	Australia by an innings and 360 runs
Test 1593	8–12 March	Mark Boucher	Steve Waugh	Newlands Cricket Ground, Cape Town	Australia by 4 wickets
Test 1595	15–18 March	Mark Boucher	Steve Waugh	Kingsmead Cricket Ground, Durban	South Africa by 5 wickets
ODI series
No.	Date	Home captain	Away captain	Venue	Result
ODI 1819	22 March	Shaun Pollock	Ricky Ponting	New Wanderers Stadium, Johannesburg	Australia by 19 runs
ODI 1820	24 March	Shaun Pollock	Ricky Ponting	SuperSport Park, Centurion	Australia by 45 runs
ODI 1821	27 March	Shaun Pollock	Ricky Ponting	North West Cricket Stadium, Potchefstroom	Match tied
ODI 1822	30 March	Shaun Pollock	Ricky Ponting	Goodyear Park, Bloemfontein	Australia by 37 runs
ODI 1823	3 April	Shaun Pollock	Ricky Ponting	Kingsmead Cricket Ground, Durban	Australia by 8 wickets
ODI 1824	6 April	Shaun Pollock	Ricky Ponting	St George's Park, Port Elizabeth	Australia by 3 wickets
ODI 1827	9 April	Shaun Pollock	Ricky Ponting	Newlands Cricket Ground, Cape Town	South Africa by 65 runs (D/L)

== April ==
=== 2002 Sharjah Cup ===
Group stage
No.	Date	Team 1	Captain 1	Team 2	Captain 2	Venue	Result
ODI 1825	8 April	Pakistan	Waqar Younis	Sri Lanka	Sanath Jayasuriya	Sharjah Cricket Association Stadium, Sharjah	Sri Lanka by 41 runs
ODI 1826	9 April	New Zealand	Stephen Fleming	Sri Lanka	Sanath Jayasuriya	Sharjah Cricket Association Stadium, Sharjah	New Zealand by 11 runs
ODI 1828	11 April	New Zealand	Stephen Fleming	Pakistan	Waqar Younis	Sharjah Cricket Association Stadium, Sharjah	Pakistan by 51 runs
ODI 1825	12 April	Pakistan	Waqar Younis	Sri Lanka	Sanath Jayasuriya	Sharjah Cricket Association Stadium, Sharjah	Sri Lanka by 9 runs
ODI 1830	14 April	New Zealand	Stephen Fleming	Sri Lanka	Sanath Jayasuriya	Sharjah Cricket Association Stadium, Sharjah	Sri Lanka by 46 runs
ODI 1831	15 April	New Zealand	Stephen Fleming	Pakistan	Waqar Younis	Sharjah Cricket Association Stadium, Sharjah	Pakistan by 8 wickets
Final
ODI 1832	17 April	Pakistan	Waqar Younis	Sri Lanka	Sanath Jayasuriya	Sharjah Cricket Association Stadium, Sharjah	Pakistan by 217 runs
