= Rhodes Estate Preparatory School =

Location
- Matopos Way; Bulawayo; Zimbabwe; 20.38249°S 28.51009°E

Information
- Type: Preparatory School
- Motto: "More Auctoris" (More Doers)
- Established: 1932
- Staff: <50
- Gender: Boys and girls
- Age: 8 to 12
- Houses: Victory, Nelson, Rodney, Vanguard, Ajax, Warspite
- Colours: Purple, Grey, Gold
- Alumni: Old Rhodesians
- Website: Official website

Rhodes Estate Preparatory School (known informally as REPS or R.E.P.S) is a private boarding preparatory school in Matopos, Bulawayo, Zimbabwe near the Matobo National Park. Founded in 1932, its completion was funded by the estate of Cecil John Rhodes, after whom it is named and whose summer home is located on the main site. The school is modelled after the traditional British public school in terms of system, structure and traditions due to its deep English roots. It was formerly all-boys until 2016.

== Overview ==
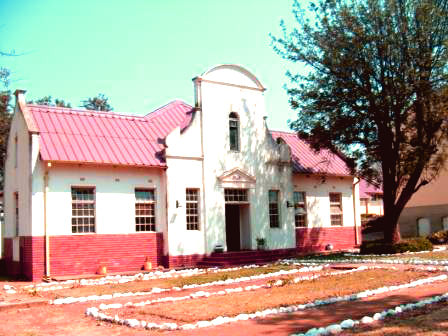
The School Hall. This is where assembly, celebrations and special occasions take place. Inside is a stage, grand piano and projector used during stage plays.

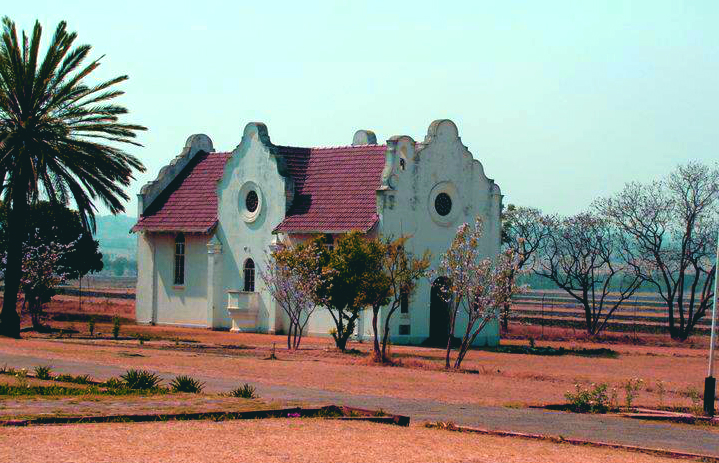
This is the chapel where all Sunday services are held. During the spring term, however, the boys are required to attend service on some Wednesday evenings and on the last Friday of the term.

The school admits boys from the ages of 8–12 (Grades 3 to 7) on basis of academic, musical and/or sporting merit. Some boys are required to take an entrance examination, but most enter directly and follow the school's curriculum. Originally, the school only admitted white pupils but following the dissolution of Zimbabwe Rhodesia and Zimbabwean independence in 1980, its student body soon diversified. However, the school maintained its low acceptance rate and merit-based admissions system. During the 20th Century, the school was recognised as one of the most prestigious of its kind in Zimbabwe and maintains that reputation to-date.

Almost all pupils (known as REPS boys) gain entry to top private secondary schools in Zimbabwe. Most boys go on to excel at such schools as, Brother school, Plumtree High School, Falcon College, Christian Brothers College, Bulawayo, and Watershed College. Recently, however, a large number of REPS boys attend secondary schools abroad. The boys are famous for being competent rugby players and cricketers and its alumni includes Henry Olonga, his brother Victor Olonga and Heath Streak. Each year, the school produces at least one Matabeleland Duikers U13 Rugby player, the greatest honour in Matabeleland at that level of play.

== School terms ==
There are three academic terms in the year:

- Summer term, from early January to late March. This is when most new boys are admitted to the school.
- Winter term, from early May to late July. Few boys are accepted during this term.
- Spring term, from early September to mid December. No boys are accepted during this term.

At least once every term, boys have an exeat weekend which allows them to return home between Friday and Sunday, before normal timetable is resumed the following Monday.

=== Summer term ===
The summer term usually commences one week after each new year. During this term, new boys (known as "lighties") join the school whilst existing boys progress to the next grade, which requires moving into a new dormitory house ("dorms"). Unlike the other two terms, all boys must take part in compulsory cross country running every morning and sometimes in the afternoon too. Junior boys (grades 3 and 4) complete a 3 kilometre course known as the "sadac" because its route winds around SADC headquarters, while senior boys (grades 5 to 7) take a longer route colloquially referred to as the "dip tank" which is approximately 5 kilometres. Most boys participate in track and field athletics and long-distance running, with few taking part in racquet sports such as tennis. The daily uniform in summer consists of short-sleeved khaki shirts, khaki shorts, knee-length grey socks, veldskoen chukka boots and, on weekends, a safari hat. This is worn to lessons, the dining hall, and during social time but is substituted for full colours for Sunday chapel service.

=== Winter term ===
This is the most popular term for two key reasons. Firstly, this is the biggest sporting season insofar as the boys play rugby (or "rugger") every week and is the term during which trials for Matabeleland Duikers U13 rugby take place. Rugby is a very popular sport at REPS, with over half the boys taking part to form the First, Second and Colts teams. The First team plays at a competitive level, often defeating local schools such as Whitestone School and Petra Junior School and faring well in the coveted Falcon College Junior Rugby Festival. Those boys not taking part in rugby are encouraged to do other sports such as gymnastics which, although less popular, attract a fraction of the school's population. The daily uniform is altered in winter to match the weather conditions: boys wear their summer gear but without the safari hat and may wear a grey sweatshirt with purple lining and/or the school's purple jacket, but not blazer, purple gloves and the school's scarf. Unlike the other two terms, there is one exeat weekend in winter, often in the second week of June.

=== Spring term ===
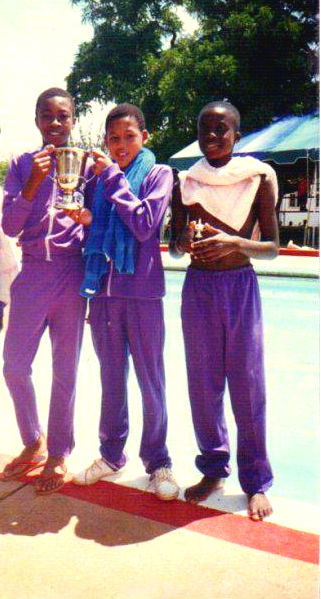
Three REPS boys wearing full sports colours at a swimming gala in 1992

Spring term is often confused for the summer term due to similar weather conditions. However, unlike the summer term, this is the official cricket and swimming term (whereas in the summer term both sports are merely for physical education purposes and leisure). The school has an outdoor pool located opposite the dining hall and hostels and adjacent to the classrooms. REPS boys often take part in swimming gala events in central Bulawayo against other schools where they often come in the top three. Cricket is more popular, however, with boys doing it for both leisure and competitive purposes. The school often produces two cricket teams – the seniors and juniors – which usually compete against schools in Bulawayo and Beitbridge, its most popular rivals being Centenary and Masiyephambili Junior School, against whom it shares a long-standing rivalry. It is during this term that senior boys (Grade 7) sit their external 11+ exams and the rest of the school sit internal assessment tests.

== Houses ==
There are two types of house at REPS; sporting house and dormitory house. There are six dormitory houses:

- Victory (Grade 3)
- Nelson (Grade 4)
- Rodney (Grade 5.I)
- Vanguard (Grade 5.II)
- Ajax (Grade 6)
- Warspite (Grade 7)

And two sporting houses:

- Falcons
- Eagles
- Hull
- Cecil

=== Dormitories ===
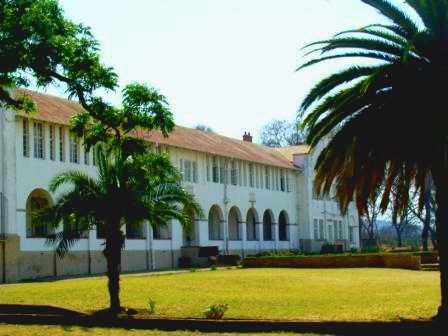
The school's hostel which houses the six dormitory houses

The six dormitories share similar cultures and amenities, the key difference being cohort. All dormitories have a hall monitor and a prefect to supervise the boys, selected by senior staff and the headmaster and are responsible for overseeing the boys' daily performance and welfare. New boys board at Victory, where they are "trained", before progressing to Nelson the following year. There are two Grade 5 dorms, Rodney and Vanguard, which house different types of boy based on performance and behaviour in Nelson and are traditional rivals. Each dorm houses approximately 15 students each year, depending on the school's intake.

=== Sports ===
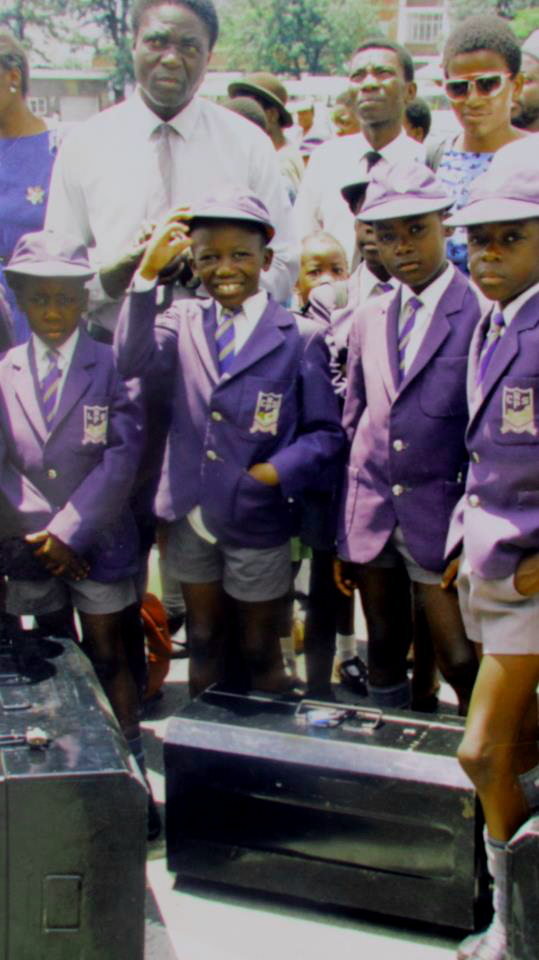
REPS boys wearing full colours at the end of term

There are two sporting houses, Falcons and Eagles, which compete in inter-house competitions in mainly sport, but also chess and drama. Membership is determined at the start of each year (during the summer term) and is not fixed i.e. what house you belong to changes every year. Falcons and Eagles are rivals in the following sports:

- Rugby
- Cricket
- Swimming
- Athletics
- Tennis
- netball

== Teaching ==
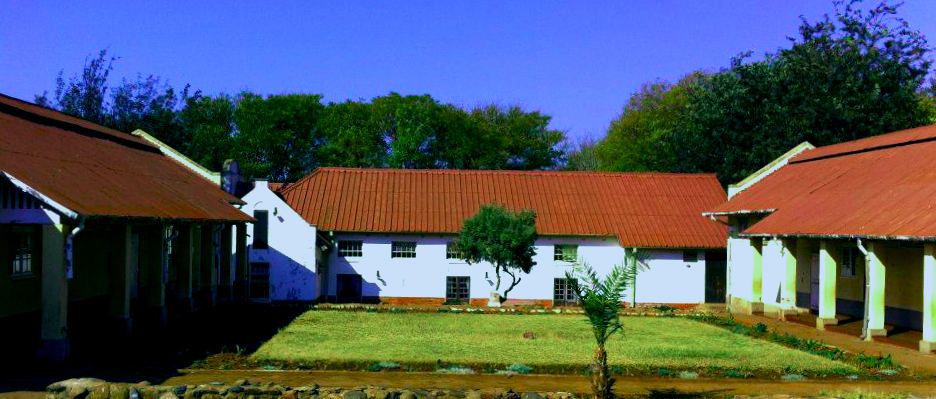
Informally known as "the quads", this is the learning area with classrooms for Grades 3–7 and a computer room. During exams time (spring term), the area remains open to senior students until 7pm.

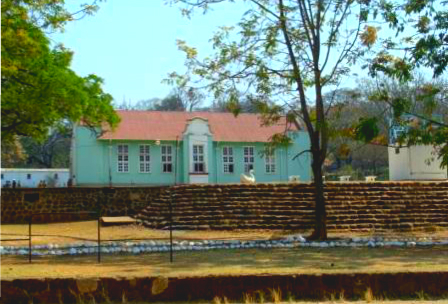
The exterior of the Hall. This is where all meals are eaten in silent, and an area open to the boys only during mealtimes.

On average, there are 10 students per class, with up to three teachers per class teaching different subjects. The school's curriculum is varied and very intense. Junior boys (Grades 3 and 4) follow a curriculum consisting of:

- English (spoken and written)
- Mathematics (mechanical and mental)
- Religious Studies
- Social Studies
- Landforms & Maps
- History of Africa
- IT
- IsiNdebele
- Home Economics
- computers

This changes once the boys reach Grade 5. They stop learning Home Economics, and History of Africa, which are substituted for new subjects:

- Science
- Music or Drawing
- World history

The school follows the Zimbabwe School Examinations Council (ZIMSEC) Grade 7 syllabus and senior boys (Grade 7) sit these exams in the spring term for entry to secondary school.

== 2021 Sexual abuse case ==
In 2021, the school communicated to parents about a case of sexual abuse committed by an assistant headmaster.

== Notable alumni ==
- Heath Streak
- Henry Olonga
- David Lewis
- Bryan Strang

== See also ==
- List of schools in Zimbabwe
