= List of Zimbabwe national cricket captains =

Zimbabwe became a full member of the International Cricket Council (ICC) on 6 July 1992, thereby gaining the right to play Test matches. It had previously become an associate member of the ICC on 21 July 1981, a year after the country's internationally recognised independence. Before this, Rhodesia had competed in the South African Currie Cup domestic competition. Since joining the ICC, Zimbabwe have had seven Test captains, fourteen One Day International captains and two Twenty20 captains, along with a number of youth captains.

Before becoming a full member of the ICC, Zimbabwe played in the 1983 Cricket World Cup, when, under the captaincy of Duncan Fletcher, they beat Australia, and in the 1987 Cricket World Cup under the captaincy of John Traicos, who had previously played Test cricket for South Africa. Upon full membership, David Houghton captained the side in Zimbabwe's first Test matches, as well as in the 1992 Cricket World Cup. Andy Flower, the most successful batsman Zimbabwe has produced, captained the side to their first Test win against Pakistan in 1995. He was followed as captain by Alistair Campbell. Under his captaincy, the side achieved its first Test series win in 1998 and, in the 1999 Cricket World Cup, passed the first round for the first time.

After Campbell's resignation for "personal reasons", fast bowler Heath Streak became captain. While Test success—except against newcomers Bangladesh—remained elusive, the side once again reached the second round of the 2003 Cricket World Cup, when they co-hosted the tournament. Not long after this tournament, however, the Zimbabwe Cricket Union sacked Streak, prompting 14 other players to walk out, leaving Tatenda Taibu as captain in the age of 20 . During his tenure as captain, the side suffered its first defeat to Bangladesh and failed to win a single Test. Further political problems led to Taibu's resignation in 2006. At this point, Zimbabwe withdrew from playing Test matches. Since the Test withdrawal, several players have captained the one day side, although none has achieved significant success. The side is once again competing in the South African domestic competition under the captaincy of Hamilton Masakadza. Zimbabwe has regained its test status in 2011.

== Men's cricket ==
=== Test match captains ===
As of August 2025, 13 cricketers have captained the Zimbabwean cricket team for at least one Test match. The table of results is complete up to the second and last Test against New Zealand on 9 August 2025, the last Test in which Zimbabwe have played. Where a player has a dagger (†) next to a Test match series in which he captained at least one Test, that denotes that player deputised for the appointed captain or was appointed for a minor proportion in a series.

Zimbabwe played their first Test match, after regaining their Test status, against Bangladesh at the Harare Sports Club in Harare. The only Test started on Thursday 4 August 2011. Bangladesh won the toss and elected to field first. Zimbabwe won the Test on day five by 130 runs. Since then they won three Tests more, two against Bangladesh and one against Pakistan.

| Number | Name | Year(s) (Note: Cricket seasons are generally referred to using the summer in which matches are played. Hence a Northern Hemisphere season is encapsulated in a single year (e.g. 1986) while a Southern Hemisphere season spans two years (e.g. 1986/87).) | Opposition | Location | Played | Won | Lost | Drawn |
|---|---|---|---|---|---|---|---|---|
| 1 | David Houghton | 1992/93 | India | Zimbabwe | 1 | 0 | 0 | 1 |
| 1 | David Houghton | 1992/93 | New Zealand | Zimbabwe | 2 | 0 | 1 | 1 |
| 1 | David Houghton | 1992/93 | India | India | 1 | 0 | 1 | 0 |
| 1 | David Houghton | Total | | | 4 | 0 | 2 | 2 |
| 2 | Andy Flower | 1993/94 | Pakistan | Pakistan | 3 | 0 | 2 | 1 |
| 2 | Andy Flower | 1994/95 | Sri Lanka | Zimbabwe | 3 | 0 | 0 | 3 |
| 2 | Andy Flower | 1994/95 | Pakistan | Zimbabwe | 3 | 1 | 2 | 0 |
| 2 | Andy Flower | 1995/96 | South Africa | Zimbabwe | 1 | 0 | 1 | 0 |
| 2 | Andy Flower | 1995/96 | New Zealand | New Zealand | 2 | 0 | 0 | 2 |
| 2 | Andy Flower | 1999/2000 | South Africa | Zimbabwe | 1 | 0 | 1 | 0 |
| 2 | Andy Flower | 1999/2000 | Sri Lanka | Zimbabwe | 3 | 0 | 1 | 2 |
| 2 | Andy Flower | 1999/2000 | West Indies | West Indies | 2 | 0 | 2 | 0 |
| 2 | Andy Flower | 2000 | England | England | 2 | 0 | 1 | 1 |
| 2 | Andy Flower | Total | | | 20 | 1 | 10 | 9 |
| 3 | Alistair Campbell | 1996 | Sri Lanka | Sri Lanka | 2 | 0 | 2 | 0 |
| 3 | Alistair Campbell | 1996/97 | Pakistan | Pakistan | 2 | 0 | 1 | 1 |
| 3 | Alistair Campbell | 1996/97 | England | Zimbabwe | 2 | 0 | 0 | 2 |
| 3 | Alistair Campbell | 1997/98 | New Zealand | Zimbabwe | 2 | 0 | 0 | 2 |
| 3 | Alistair Campbell | 1997/98 | Sri Lanka | Sri Lanka | 2 | 0 | 2 | 0 |
| 3 | Alistair Campbell | 1997/98 | New Zealand | New Zealand | 2 | 0 | 2 | 0 |
| 3 | Alistair Campbell | 1997/98 | Pakistan | Zimbabwe | 2 | 0 | 1 | 1 |
| 3 | Alistair Campbell | 1998/99 | India | Zimbabwe | 1 | 1 | 0 | 0 |
| 3 | Alistair Campbell | 1998/99 | Pakistan | Pakistan | 2 | 1 | 0 | 1 |
| 3 | Alistair Campbell | 1999/2000 | Australia | Zimbabwe | 1 | 0 | 1 | 0 |
| 3 | Alistair Campbell | 1999/2000 | South Africa | South Africa | 1 | 0 | 1 | 0 |
| 3 | Alistair Campbell | 2002/03 | Pakistan | Zimbabwe | 2 | 0 | 2 | 0 |
| 3 | Alistair Campbell | Total | | | 21 | 2 | 12 | 7 |
| 4 | Heath Streak | 2000/01 | New Zealand | Zimbabwe | 2 | 0 | 2 | 0 |
| 4 | Heath Streak | 2000/01 | India | India | 2 | 0 | 1 | 1 |
| 4 | Heath Streak | 2000/01 | New Zealand | New Zealand | 1 | 0 | 0 | 1 |
| 4 | Heath Streak | 2000/01 | Bangladesh | Zimbabwe | 2 | 2 | 0 | 0 |
| 4 | Heath Streak | 2001 | India | Zimbabwe | 2 | 1 | 1 | 0 |
| 4 | Heath Streak | 2001 | West Indies | Zimbabwe | 2 | 0 | 1 | 1 |
| 4 | Heath Streak | 2001/02 | South Africa | Zimbabwe | 2 | 0 | 1 | 1 |
| 4 | Heath Streak | 2003 | England | England | 2 | 0 | 2 | 0 |
| 4 | Heath Streak | 2003/04 | Australia | Australia | 2 | 0 | 2 | 0 |
| 4 | Heath Streak | 2003/04 | West Indies | Zimbabwe | 2 | 0 | 1 | 1 |
| 4 | Heath Streak | 2003/04 | Bangladesh | Zimbabwe | 2 | 1 | 0 | 1 |
| 4 | Heath Streak | Total | | | 21 | 4 | 11 | 6 |
| 5 | Brian Murphy | 2001/02 | Bangladesh | Bangladesh | 1 | 0 | 0 | 1 |
| 6 | Stuart Carlisle | 2001/02† | Bangladesh | Bangladesh | 1 | 1 | 0 | 0 |
| 6 | Stuart Carlisle | 2001/02 | Sri Lanka | Sri Lanka | 3 | 0 | 3 | 0 |
| 6 | Stuart Carlisle | 2001/02 | India | India | 2 | 0 | 2 | 0 |
| 6 | Stuart Carlisle | Total | | | 6 | 1 | 5 | 0 |
| 7 | Tatenda Taibu | 2004 | Sri Lanka | Zimbabwe | 2 | 0 | 2 | 0 |
| 7 | Tatenda Taibu | 2004/05 | Bangladesh | Bangladesh | 2 | 0 | 1 | 1 |
| 7 | Tatenda Taibu | 2004/05 | South Africa | South Africa | 2 | 0 | 2 | 0 |
| 7 | Tatenda Taibu | 2005/06 | New Zealand | Zimbabwe | 2 | 0 | 2 | 0 |
| 7 | Tatenda Taibu | 2005/06 | India | Zimbabwe | 2 | 0 | 2 | 0 |
| 7 | Tatenda Taibu | Total | | | 10 | 0 | 9 | 1 |
| 8 | Brendan Taylor | 2011 | Bangladesh | Zimbabwe | 1 | 1 | 0 | 0 |
| 8 | Brendan Taylor | 2011 | Pakistan | Zimbabwe | 1 | 0 | 1 | 0 |
| 8 | Brendan Taylor | 2011 | New Zealand | Zimbabwe | 1 | 0 | 1 | 0 |
| 8 | Brendan Taylor | 2012 | New Zealand | New Zealand | 1 | 0 | 1 | 0 |
| 8 | Brendan Taylor | 2013 | West Indies | West Indies | 2 | 0 | 2 | 0 |
| 8 | Brendan Taylor | 2013 | Bangladesh | Zimbabwe | 2 | 1 | 1 | 0 |
| 8 | Brendan Taylor | 2013 | Pakistan | Zimbabwe | 1 | 1 | 0 | 0 |
| 8 | Brendan Taylor | 2014 | South Africa | Zimbabwe | 1 | 0 | 1 | 0 |
| 8 | Brendan Taylor | 2014 | Bangladesh | Bangladesh | 3 | 0 | 3 | 0 |
| 8 | Brendan Taylor | 2021 | Pakistan | Zimbabwe | 2 | 0 | 2 | 0 |
| 8 | Brendan Taylor | 2021 | Bangladesh | Zimbabwe | 1 | 0 | 1 | 0 |
| 8 | Brendan Taylor | Total | | | 16 | 3 | 13 | 0 |
| 9 | Hamilton Masakadza | 2013 | Pakistan | Zimbabwe | 1 | 0 | 1 | 0 |
| 9 | Hamilton Masakadza | 2018/19 | Bangladesh | Bangladesh | 2 | 1 | 1 | 0 |
| 9 | Hamilton Masakadza | Total | | | 3 | 1 | 2 | 0 |
| 10 | Graeme Cremer | 2016 | New Zealand | Zimbabwe | 2 | 0 | 2 | 0 |
| 10 | Graeme Cremer | 2016 | Sri Lanka | Zimbabwe | 2 | 0 | 2 | 0 |
| 10 | Graeme Cremer | 2016 | Sri Lanka | Sri Lanka | 1 | 0 | 1 | 0 |
| 10 | Graeme Cremer | 2017/18 | West Indies | Zimbabwe | 2 | 0 | 1 | 1 |
| 10 | Graeme Cremer | 2017/18 | South Africa | South Africa | 1 | 0 | 1 | 0 |
| 10 | Graeme Cremer | Total | | | 8 | 0 | 7 | 1 |
| 11 | Sean Williams | 2019/20 | Sri Lanka | Zimbabwe | 2 | 0 | 1 | 1 |
| 11 | Sean Williams | 2021 | Afghanistan | UAE | 2 | 1 | 1 | 0 |
| 11 | Sean Williams | Total | | | 4 | 1 | 2 | 1 |
| 12 | Craig Ervine | 2019/20† | Bangladesh | Bangladesh | 1 | 0 | 1 | 0 |
| 12 | Craig Ervine | 2023 | West Indies | Zimbabwe | 2 | 0 | 1 | 1 |
| 12 | Craig Ervine | 2024 | Ireland | Ireland | 1 | 0 | 1 | 0 |
| 12 | Craig Ervine | 2024-25 | Afghanistan | Zimbabwe | 2 | 0 | 1 | 1 |
| 12 | Craig Ervine | 2025 | Bangladesh | Bangladesh | 2 | 1 | 1 | 0 |
| 12 | Craig Ervine | 2025 | England | England | 1 | 0 | 1 | 0 |
| 12 | Craig Ervine | 2025 | South Africa | Zimbabwe | 2 | 0 | 2 | 0 |
| 12 | Craig Ervine | 2025 | New Zealand | Zimbabwe | 2 | 0 | 2 | 0 |
| 12 | Craig Ervine | Total | | | 13 | 1 | 10 | 2 |
| 13 | Johnathan Campbell | 2025† | Ireland | Zimbabwe | 1 | 0 | 1 | 0 |
| Grand total | | | | | 128 | 14 | 84 | 30 |

=== One Day International captains ===
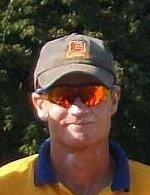
Grant Flower, captain for a single ODI in 2001

As of February 2025, 23 cricketers have captained the Zimbabwean cricket team for at least one One Day International.The table of results is complete up to the third and final ODI against Ireland in February 2025.

| NO. | Name | Span | Played | Won | Tied | Lost | NR |
|---|---|---|---|---|---|---|---|
| 1 | Duncan Fletcher | 1983 | 6 | 1 | 0 | 5 | 0 |
| 2 | John Traicos | 1987 | 6 | 0 | 0 | 6 | 0 |
| 3 | David Houghton | 1992/93 | 17 | 1 | 0 | 16 | 0 |
| 4 | Andy Flower^{1} | 1993–2000 | 52 | 12 | 2 | 35 | 3 |
| 5 | Alistair Campbell | 1996–2002 | 86 | 30 | 2 | 52 | 2 |
| 6 | Heath Streak | 2000–2004 | 68 | 18 | 0 | 47 | 3 |
| 7 | Grant Flower^{1} | 2001 | 1 | 0 | 0 | 1 | 0 |
| 8 | Guy Whittall | 2001 | 4 | 0 | 0 | 4 | 0 |
| 9 | Brian Murphy | 2001 | 4 | 0 | 0 | 4 | 0 |
| 10 | Stuart Carlisle | 2001/02 | 12 | 6 | 0 | 6 | 0 |
| 11 | Tatenda Taibu | 2004–05 | 29 | 2 | 0 | 27 | 0 |
| 12 | Terry Duffin | 2006 | 13 | 5 | 0 | 7 | 1 |
| 13 | Prosper Utseya | 2006–2010 | 68 | 20 | 1 | 47 | 0 |
| 14 | Hamilton Masakadza | 2008–2015, 2018-2019 | 25 | 0 | 0 | 24 | 1 |
| 15 | Elton Chigumbura | 2010–2016 | 62 | 18 | 0 | 44 | 0 |
| 16 | Brendan Taylor | 2011–2015, 2021 | 37 | 9 | 0 | 28 | 0 |
| 17 | Graeme Cremer | 2016–2018 | 35 | 12 | 2 | 20 | 1 |
| 18 | Peter Moor | 2019 | 4 | 4 | 0 | 0 | 0 |
| 19 | Chamu Chibhabha | 2020 | 4 | 0 | 1 | 3 | 0 |
| 20 | Sean Williams | 2020-2023 | 3 | 1 | 0 | 2 | 0 |
| 21 | Craig Ervine | 2021-Present | 32 | 12 | 0 | 16 | 4 |
| 22 | Regis Chakabva | 2022 | 8 | 3 | 0 | 5 | 0 |
| 23 | Sikandar Raza | 2022-2023 | 5 | 0 | 0 | 4 | 1 |
| Grand total | | | 581 | 154 | 8 | 403 | 16 |

^{1}Andy Flower and Grant Flower are brothers.

=== Twenty20 International captains ===
As of August 2025, 11 cricketers have captained the Zimbabwean cricket team for at least one Twenty20 international.The table of results is complete up to the tri-series match against New Zealand in July 2025.

| No. | Name | Year | Played | Won | Tied | Lost | NR |
|---|---|---|---|---|---|---|---|
| 1 | Prosper Utseya | 2006–2010 | 10 | 3 | 1 | 6 | 0 |
| 2 | Elton Chigumbura | 2010-2016 | 18 | 2 | 0 | 16 | 0 |
| 3 | Brendan Taylor | 2011–2014, 2021 | 18 | 4 | 0 | 14 | 0 |
| 4 | Sikandar Raza | 2015, 2021-present | 42 | 18 | 0 | 22 | 2 |
| 5 | Hamilton Masakadza | 2016-2019 | 19 | 5 | 1 | 13 | 0 |
| 6 | Graeme Cremer | 2016-2018 | 5 | 1 | 0 | 4 | 0 |
| 7 | Sean Williams | 2019-2023 | 12 | 3 | 0 | 9 | 0 |
| 8 | Chamu Chibhabha | 2020 | 3 | 0 | 0 | 3 | 0 |
| 9 | Craig Ervine | 2021–2023 | 38 | 20 | 0 | 17 | 1 |
| 10 | Regis Chakabva | 2022 | 2 | 0 | 0 | 2 | 0 |
| 11 | Ryan Burl | 2023 | 1 | 0 | 0 | 1 | 0 |
| Grand total | | | 168 | 56 | 2 | 107 | 3 |

== Youth cricket ==
=== Test match captains ===
Two cricketers have captained the Zimbabwean Under-19 cricket team for at least one under-19 Test match.

| Number | Name | Year | Opposition | Location | Played | Won | Lost | Drawn |
|---|---|---|---|---|---|---|---|---|
| 1 | Brian Murphy | 1995/96 | England | Zimbabwe | 3 | 0 | 2 | 1 |
| 2 | Bertus Erasmus | 1997 | England | England | 3 | 0 | 2 | 1 |
| Grand total | | | | | 6 | 0 | 4 | 2 |

=== Youth One-Day International captains ===
Ten cricketers have captained the Zimbabwean Under-19 cricket team for at least one Under-19 One Day International.

| No. | Name | Year | Played | Won | Tied | Lost | NoR |
|---|---|---|---|---|---|---|---|
| 1 | Brian Murphy | 1996 | 1 | 0 | 0 | 1 | 0 |
| 2 | Bertus Erasmus | 1997 | 2 | 0 | 0 | 2 | 0 |
| 3 | Mark Vermeulen | 1997 | 6 | 2 | 0 | 4 | 0 |
| 4 | Mluleki Nkala | 2000 | 3 | 0 | 0 | 3 | 0 |
| 5 | Travis Friend | 2000 | 4 | 3 | 0 | 1 | 0 |
| 6 | Tatenda Taibu | 2002 | 8 | 6 | 0 | 2 | 0 |
| 7 | Tinotenda Mawoyo | 2004 | 6 | 3 | 0 | 3 | 0 |
| 8 | Sean Williams | 2005/06 | 10 | 3 | 0 | 7 | 0 |
| 9 | Prince Masvaure | 2008 | 6 | 1 | 0 | 5 | 0 |
| 10 | Dylan Higgins | 2009/10 | 12 | 3 | 0 | 9 | 0 |
| 11 | Tinotenda Mutombodzi | 2009 | 5 | 0 | 0 | 5 | 0 |
| 12 | Peter Moor | 2010 | 5 | 0 | 0 | 5 | 0 |
| 13 | Godwill Mamhiyo | 2011 | 4 | 0 | 0 | 4 | 0 |
| 14 | Roy Kaia | 2011 | 1 | 0 | 0 | 1 | 0 |
| 15 | Matthew Bentley | 2012 | 10 | 2 | 0 | 8 | 0 |
| 16 | Ryan Burl | 2012 | 1 | 0 | 0 | 1 | 0 |
| 17 | Luke Masasire | 2012 | 1 | 0 | 0 | 1 | 0 |
| 18 | Malcolm Lake | 2014 | 11 | 2 | 0 | 9 | 0 |
| 19 | Joylord Gumbie | 2014 | 1 | 1 | 0 | 0 | 0 |
| 20 | Brandon Mavuta | 2015-2016 | 10 | 3 | 0 | 7 | 0 |
| 21 | Liam Roche | 2017 | 2 | 0 | 0 | 2 | 0 |
| 22 | Jonathan Connolly | 2017 | 3 | 1 | 0 | 2 | 0 |
| 23 | Ryan Murray | 2017 | 1 | 0 | 0 | 1 | 0 |
| Grand total | | | 113 | 30 | 0 | 83 | 0 |

== ICC Trophy ==
The ICC Trophy is the leading one-day tournament from non-Test teams, and Zimbabwe participated in the tournament before they gained Test status in 1992. Two cricketers captained Zimbabwe in the ICC Trophy.

| Number | Name | Trophy | Played | Won | Tied | Lost | No result | Note(s) |
|---|---|---|---|---|---|---|---|---|
| 1 | Duncan Fletcher | 1982 | 7 | 7 | 0 | 0 | 0 | Winners |
| 2 | David Houghton | 1986 | 8 | 8 | 0 | 0 | 0 | Winners |
| 2 | David Houghton | 1990 | 8 | 8 | 0 | 0 | 0 | Winners |
| Grand total | | | 23 | 23 | 0 | 0 | 0 | |
