= Coseley Swimming Baths =

Leisure centre in England, 1963 to 2009

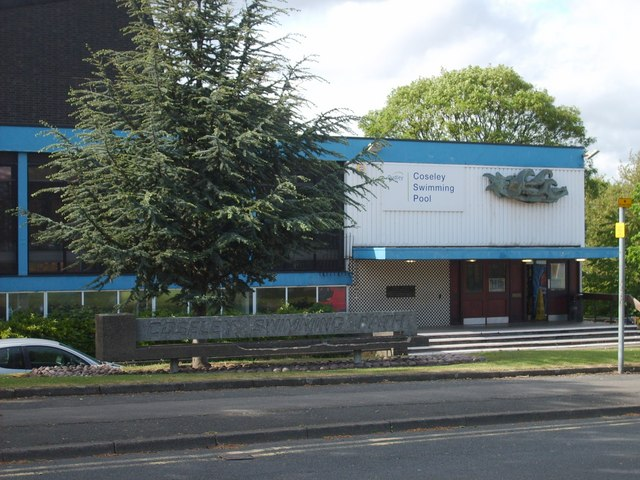
- Interactive map of Coseley Swimming Baths
- Location: Pear Tree Lane, Coseley, West Midlands
- Coordinates: 52°32′39.66″N 2°4′45.95″W
- Dimensions: Length: 110 ft (34 m); Width: 42 ft (13 m); Depth: 14 ft 3 in (4.34 m)

Construction
- Opened: 30 November 1963
- Closed: 2009
- Demolished: 2010

Coseley Swimming Baths was a leisure centre located in Coseley, West Midlands, England before its closure in 2009.

== History ==
Work began to build the leisure centre on 25 August 1962 with Councillor John T. “Jack” Wilson laying the foundation stone. The pool was supported on a suspended reinforced concrete slab that was then supported by concrete beams and columns. This was due to the ground being heavily mined in the past.

Coseley Swimming Baths was opened on 30 November 1963 by Councillor John Pointon, Chairman of the Council. The pool contained a 5-metre firm board with both 1 and 3-metre springboards. A 213-seat spectator balcony was built overlooking the swimming pool, with additional seating that could take the capacity to 350. There were changing rooms and cloakrooms, a sun terrace at pool level and a café selling light beverages and snacks.

In the late 1980s, a ‘Supachute’ water slide was added to the side of the leisure centre which allowed swimmers to slide down a chute into the swimming pool.

The swimming baths were used for swimming galas as well as County and National swimming events. It was also the headquarters of the Coseley Town Swimming Club.

== Closure and demolition ==
The building began to deteriorate in the 1980s and 1990s. Dudley Council deemed the building was too expensive to repair and the decision was made to close the leisure centre. In August 2009, the leisure centre closed to the public despite 9000 local people signing a petition to save it. The leisure centre building was finally demolished in March 2010.
