= 2002 Sharjah Cup =

Sharjah Cup Triangular Series 2002
- Date: 8 April – 17 April 2002
- Location: United Arab Emirates
- Result: Pakistan won the 2002 Sharjah Cup
- Player of the series: Marvan Atapattu (Sri)
Teams
New Zealand	Pakistan	Sri Lanka
Captains
Stephen Fleming	Waqar Younis	Sanath Jayasuriya
Most runs
Chris Harris (139)	Imran Nazir (226)	Marvan Atapattu (233)
Most wickets
Scott Styris (9)	Shoaib Akhtar (10)	Muttiah Muralitharan (9)

The 2002 Sharjah Cup Triangular Series was a One Day International (ODI) cricket tournament held in the United Arab Emirates in April 2002. It was a tri-nation series between the national representative cricket teams of the Sri Lanka, New Zealand and Pakistan. Pakistan won the tournament by defeating Sri Lanka by 217 runs in the final. All matches were held at Sharjah Cricket Stadium.

== Squads ==
New Zealand	Pakistan	Sri Lanka
Stephen Fleming (c); Matt Horne; Chris Harris; Nathan Astle; Jacob Oram; ~~Lou Vincent~~; Scott Styris; Andre Adams; Brooke Walker; Daryl Tuffey; Ian Butler; Chris Nevin; Craig McMillan; James Franklin; Mathew Sinclair	Waqar Younis (c); Shahid Afridi; Imran Nazir; Younis Khan; Inzamam-ul-Haq; Yousuf Youhana; Misbah-ul-Haq; Shoaib Malik; Rashid Latif; Abdul Razzaq; Wasim Akram; Shoaib Akhtar; Saqlain Mushtaq; Mohammad Sami; Azhar Mahmood; Faisal Iqbal	Sanath Jayasuriya (c); Marvan Atapattu; Mahela Jayawardene; Kumar Sangakkara; Russel Arnold; Tillakaratne Dilshan; Romesh Kaluwitharana; Upul Chandana; Kumar Dharmasena; Chaminda Vaas; Charitha Buddhika; Nuwan Zoysa; Muttiah Muralitharan; Dilhara Fernando; Pulasthi Gunaratne

Lou Vincent was initially named in New Zealand's ODI squad, but withdrawn due to chest injury. Mathew Sinclair was added to the squad for Vincent.

== Matches ==
=== 1st ODI ===
8 April (D/N)
Scorecard

Sri Lanka; 242/9 (50 overs)	v	Pakistan; 201 (45.5 overs)
Sanath Jayasuriya 87 (78); Shoaib Akhtar 3/30 (10 overs)		Abdul Razzaq 56 (72); Muttiah Muralitharan 3/27 (10 overs)

Sri Lanka won by 41 runs
Sharjah Cricket Stadium, Sharjah
Umpires: David Shepherd (Eng) and Russell Tiffin (Zim)
Player of the match: Sanath Jayasuriya (Sri)

- Sri Lanka won the toss and elected to bat.
- Points: Sri Lanka 4, Pakistan 0.

=== 2nd ODI ===
9 April (D/N)
Scorecard

New Zealand; 218/8 (50 overs)	v	Sri Lanka; 207 (45.5 overs)
Mathew Sinclair 46* (50); Muttiah Muralitharan 5/9 (10 overs)		Marvan Atapattu 61 (102); Scott Styris 3/42 (10 overs)

New Zealand won by 11 runs
Sharjah Cricket Stadium, Sharjah
Umpires: Srinivas Venkataraghavan (Ind) and Russell Tiffin (Zim)
Player of the match: Jacob Oram (Nzl)

- New Zealand won the toss and elected to bat.
- Points: New Zealand 4, Sri Lanka 0.

=== 3rd ODI ===
11 April (D/N)
Scorecard

Pakistan; 288/6 (50 overs)	v	New Zealand; 237/8 (50 overs)
Inzamam-ul-Haq 68 (96); Scott Styris 4/30 (10 overs)		Chris Harris 54 (102); Waqar Younis 3/43 (10 overs)

Pakistan won by 51 runs
Sharjah Cricket Stadium, Sharjah
Umpires: Srinivas Venkataraghavan (Ind) and David Shepherd (Eng)
Player of the match: Inzamam-ul-Haq (Pak)

- Pakistan won the toss and elected to bat.
- Points: Pakistan 4, New Zealand 0.

=== 4th ODI ===
12 April (D/N)
Scorecard

Sri Lanka; 239/6 (50 overs)	v	Pakistan; 230/5 (50 overs)
Marvan Atapattu 77* (109); Wasim Akram 3/30 (10 overs)		Younis Khan 45 (55); Nuwan Zoysa 1/30 (8 overs)

Sri Lanka won by 9 runs
Sharjah Cricket Stadium, Sharjah
Umpires: David Shepherd (Eng) and Russell Tiffin (Zim)
Player of the match: Marvan Atapattu (Sri)

- Sri Lanka won the toss and elected to bat.
- Points: Sri Lanka 4, Pakistan 0.

=== 5th ODI ===
14 April (D/N)
Scorecard

Sri Lanka; 243/9 (50 overs)	v	New Zealand; 197/9 (50 overs)
Marvan Atapattu 82 (94); Chris Harris 3/43 (10 overs)		Craig McMillan 49 (73); Chaminda Vaas 2/8 (7 overs)

Sri Lanka won by 46 runs
Sharjah Cricket Stadium, Sharjah
Umpires: Srinivas Venkataraghavan (Ind) and Russell Tiffin (Zim)
Player of the match: Marvan Atapattu (Sri)

- Sri Lanka won the toss and elected to bat.
- Points: Sri Lanka 4, New Zealand 0.

=== 6th ODI ===
15 April (D/N)
Scorecard

New Zealand; 212/9 (50 overs)	v	Pakistan; 217/2 (31.3 overs)
Scott Styris 43 (63); Saqlain Mushtaq 3/26 (10 overs)		Shahid Afridi 108* (92); Brooke Walker 2/54 (8 overs)

Pakistan won by 8 wickets
Sharjah Cricket Stadium, Sharjah
Umpires: Srinivas Venkataraghavan (Ind) and David Shepherd (Eng)
Player of the match: Shahid Afridi (Pak)

- New Zealand won the toss and elected to bat.
- Pakistan were fined 1 over for a slow over rate.
- Points: Pakistan 5, New Zealand 0.

=== Final ===
17 April (D/N)
Scorecard

Pakistan; 295/6 (50 overs)	v	Sri Lanka; 78 (16.5 overs)
Mohammad Yousuf 129 (131); Nuwan Zoysa 3/63 (10 overs)		Russell Arnold 19 (18); Shoaib Akhtar 3/11 (4 overs)

Pakistan won by 217 runs
Sharjah Cricket Stadium, Sharjah
Umpires: David Shepherd (Eng) and Russell Tiffin (Zim)
Player of the match: Mohammad Yousuf (Pak)

- Pakistan won the toss and elected to bat.
- Pakistan won the 2001-02 Sharjah Cup.
