= Black armband protest =

2003 Zimbabwean political protest

- Duration: 2003 Cricket World Cup
- Venue: Harare Sports Club, Harare
- Cause: Protest about democracy in Zimbabwe
- Participants: Andy Flower, Henry Olonga

The black armband protest was made by Zimbabwean cricketers Andy Flower and Henry Olonga during the 2003 Cricket World Cup. The pair decided to wear black armbands to "mourn the death of democracy in Zimbabwe". The protest received condemnation from senior Zimbabwean political figures, and also some senior Zimbabwean cricket figures, but was praised by the international media. The International Cricket Council deemed that Flower and Olonga had taken a political action, but refused to charge the pair with an offence. Their initial protest was during Zimbabwe's first match of the tournament in Harare, and the pair wore armbands to protest at all of the matches. As a result of the protest, Flower and Olonga were forced to leave Zimbabwe, and both men later settled in the United Kingdom.

== Background ==
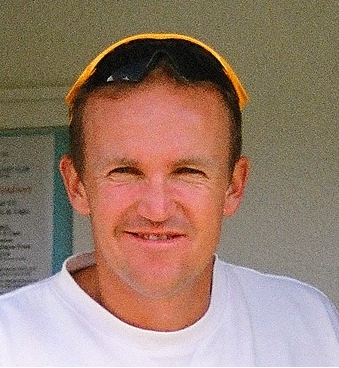
Andy Flower, one of the players involved in the protest.

The 2003 Cricket World Cup was awarded to South Africa, however they decided to award six of the group stage matches to Zimbabwe, and two to Kenya. Due to security concerns in Zimbabwe, the British and Australian governments both advised their players against travelling to Zimbabwe. In the end, England forfeited their match, whilst Australia played and won their match.

The idea of a protest was started when Andy Flower was taken by a friend, Nigel Huff, to see a farm impacted by the government's land reforms. In 2000, Robert Mugabe and the Zimbabwean government had begun a plan of land reforms for redistribution of 3,000 farms, and began compulsorily seizing land from white farmers, with forced evictions and arrests on the basis of "illegally occupying their land". By 2002, it was estimated that around 80% of the 4,500 farms that had been white-owned had been forcibly seized. Another related issue was human rights abuses and violence, particularly against political opponents in the leadup to the 2002 Zimbabwean presidential election. The EU had imposed sanctions on Zimbabwe's ruling elite, which, as of 2017, are still in place. Flower was particularly appalled by the torture of Zimbabwean MP Job Sikhala.

== The protest ==
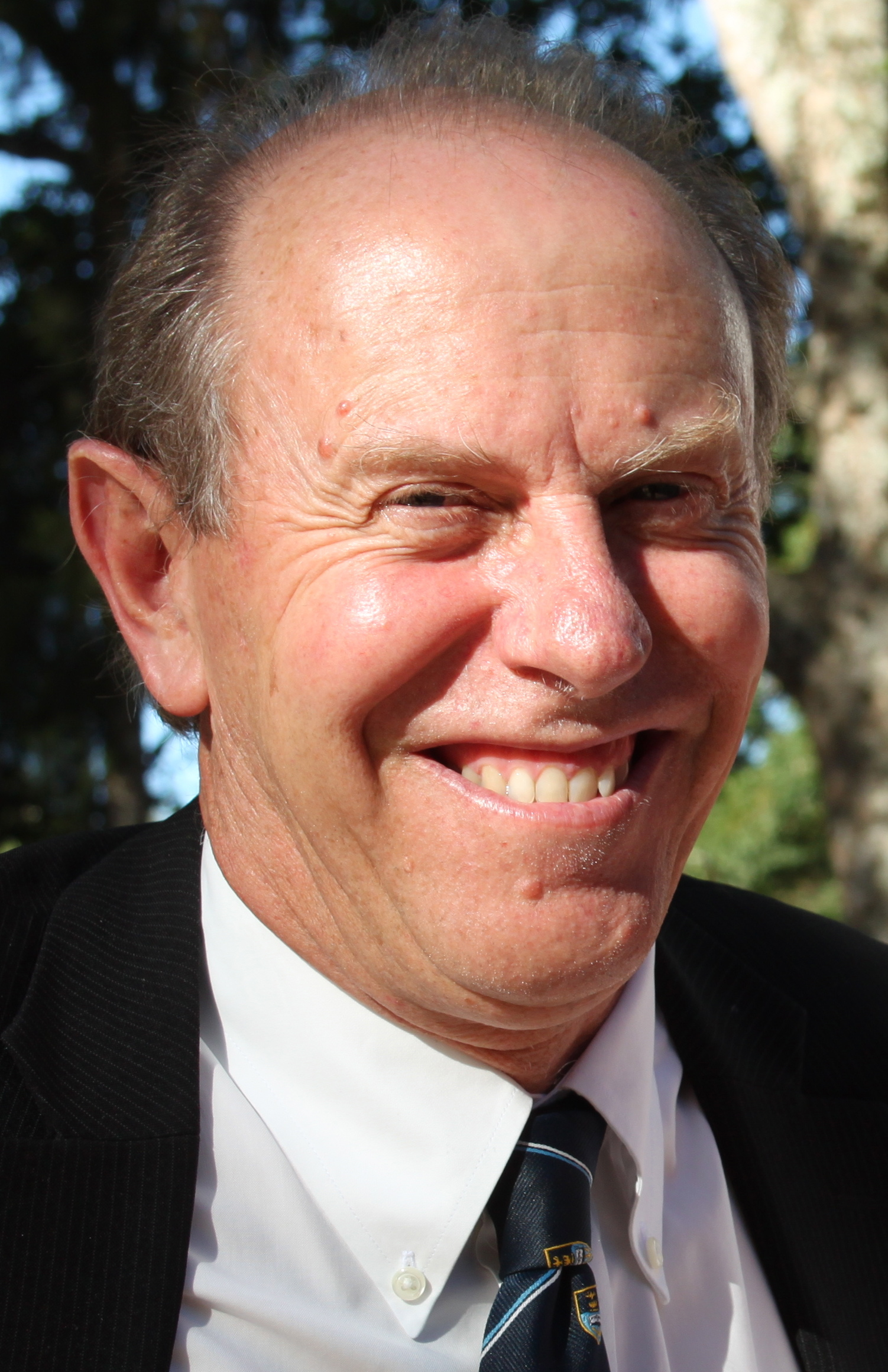
David Coltart, who suggested the wearing of black armbands.

=== Planning ===
After Flower had decided to protest, he decided that he wanted Olonga to partner him in the protest, as "one white Zimbabwean and one black one operating together gave the message the most eloquent balance." Olonga was the first black, and the youngest ever, cricketer to play for Zimbabwe. They met up in a news café in Harare to plan the protest, originally considering withdrawing from the World Cup, but later deciding to protest instead. The pair spoke with lawyer David Coltart, a founding member of the Movement for Democratic Change. Coltart suggested wearing black armbands, and helped word the statement in a non-incriminating way.

=== The protest itself ===
The match in question was between Zimbabwe and Namibia on 10 March 2003. The match was being played at the Harare Sports Club, and was the first World Cup match hosted in Zimbabwe. Prior to the protest, the only other Zimbabwean player who knew about the protest was Andy's brother Grant. In the end, the pair did not have any black armbands, and so used black insulating tape instead. Shortly before the match, they delivered their 450-word statement to the press. The statement later became commonly known as "mourning the death of democracy in Zimbabwe":

In all the circumstances, we have decided that we will each wear a black armband for the duration of the World Cup. In doing so we are mourning the death of democracy in our beloved Zimbabwe. In doing so we are making a silent plea to those responsible to stop the abuse of human rights in Zimbabwe. In doing so, we pray that our small action may help to restore sanity and dignity to our nation.

In the match, Zimbabwe batted first, and the public at the ground were not aware of the protest until the 22nd over, when Flower came out to bat wearing a black armband. Olonga was also seen wearing a black armband on the Zimbabwe team balcony. The crowd of 4,000 at the ground were supportive of the protest, and a number of them made their own black armbands during the match. In the match itself, Flower scored 39, as Zimbabwe reached 340/2, and Olonga took 0/8 in 3 overs, as Zimbabwe won a rain-affected match by 86 runs (D/L method).

== Reactions ==
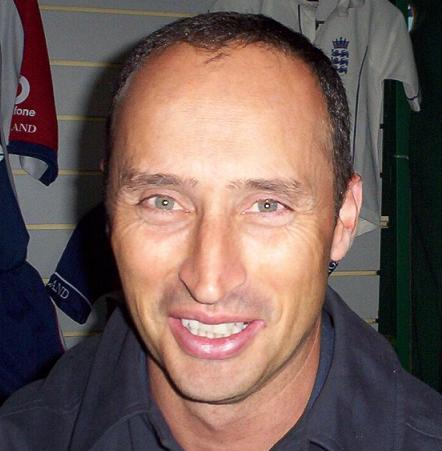
Former England captain Nasser Hussain, who said Flower and Olonga "have proved to be great men by what they have done."

After the match, one man was arrested for wearing a black armband. During Zimbabwe's next (Note: Excluding the walkover against England) group stage match against India, nearly 200 spectators wore black armbands, to support the protest.

Inside Zimbabwe, the reaction was hostile to the players. Zimbabwe's Minister of Information, Jonathan Moyo, called Olonga an "Uncle Tom" who had "a black skin and a white mask". ZANU–PF information secretary Nathan Shamuyarira claimed they were forced into it by the British media, and "No true Zimbabwean would have joined in," but "Olonga is not a Zimbabwean, he is a Zambian". Olonga was charged with treason, an offence punishable by death. MDC leader Morgan Tsvangirai released a statement in support of the protest. He was charged with treason, although the charge was later dropped. Givemore Makoni, the President of Takashinga Cricket Club where Olonga played said "It is disgraceful what Henry Olonga and Andy Flower have done. Taking politics on to the playing field is a thing the International Cricket Council and all sports organisations have been trying to avoid," and that "by taking politics on to the field and bringing the game into disrepute Henry appears to have breached Takashinga's code of conduct". Olonga was immediately suspended and later sacked by Takashinga Cricket Club. Stephen Mandongo, the President of the Zimbabwe Cricket Union also condemned the protest, saying "What Flower and Olonga did is very wrong. They have jeopardised our reputation when given this once in a lifetime chance to host the World Cup ... It would be wrong if they wore black armbands again." They referred the matter to the International Cricket Council (ICC), who deemed that they had taken a political action, but refused to charge them with a formal offence. Instead, they released a statement reiterating the apolitical nature of the organisation, and asked the players not to wear black armbands for the rest of the tournament, with the threat of more serious punishment if they continued to wear them.

The international reaction to the protest was favourable. The Times sports correspondent called it a "powerful blow for sanity, decency and democracy", whilst The Daily Telegraph's Donald Trelford praised the players and criticised the ICC and ECB, saying the players "shine out like diamonds in a pile of mud". Cricket writer Tim de Lisle praised the pair, saying that "Together they were responsible for a shining moment in the game's history ... Two strips of black tape, more potent than any logo, breathed life back into the game's battered spirit." England captain Nasser Hussain said that Flower and Olonga "have proved to be great men by what they have done." As a result of the protest, Olonga's girlfriend broke up with him, and he received numerous threatening emails and death threats.

== Aftermath ==
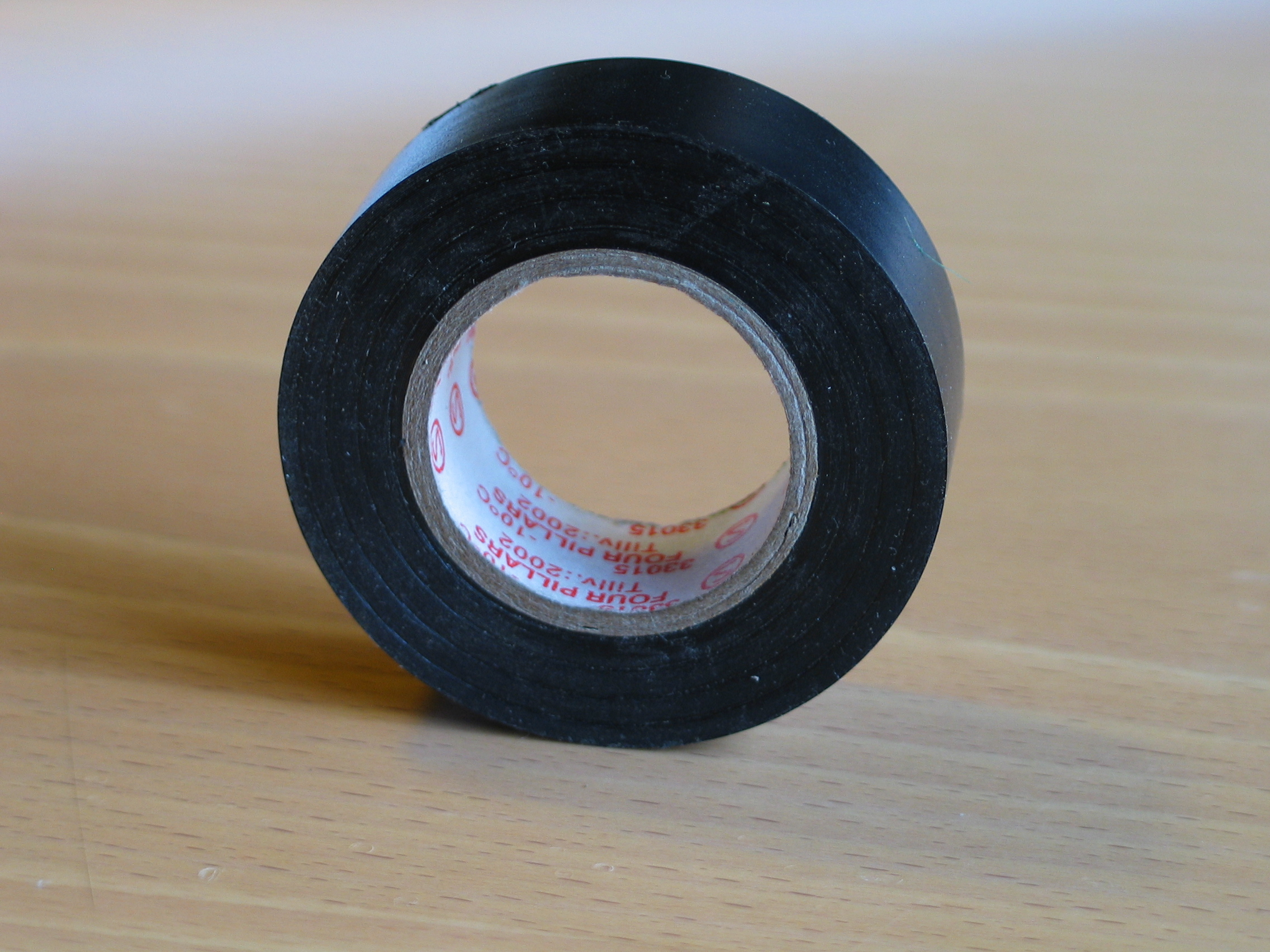
Insulating tape was used instead of black armbands in the protest.

Zimbabwe won their next match against England on a walkover, and also beat the Netherlands, and had a no-result in their final group match against Pakistan, which allowed them to qualify for the Super Sixes stage of the competition. They were eliminated in this stage, however this allowed both players to leave Zimbabwe for South Africa.

Olonga was dropped for 6 matches, (Note: Including the walkover against England) with no reason given – some have speculated that he was dropped as a result of the protest, whilst other suggest it was due to poor form. Flower on the other hand was considered "undroppable". To comply with the ICC warning not to wear black armbands, during their next group match, Flower and twelfth-man Olonga both wore black wristbands, and in subsequent matches, Flower wore white armbands. Olonga's only subsequent appearance for Zimbabwe was in their match against Kenya.

After their final Super Sixes match, Olonga immediately announced his retirement from international cricket, after 30 Test matches and 50 ODIs. Flower had already previously announced his retirement from international cricket, and had signed for Essex, and South Australia. Olonga, had not planned what to do after the protest, as he "had in my own naivety thought that I could carry on in Zimbabwe – maybe my career would come to an end but I could still live there." He would lose his property and investments in Zimbabwe, along with his fiancé who ended their relationship shortly after the match. During the team's return to the airport, team management refused to allow him on the team bus. He travelled to Johannesburg, where he stayed for a month until a stranger paid for his ticket to England where he was granted a work permit to play for Lashings Cricket Club in England. He was subsequently granted asylum in the United Kingdom.

Flower would return to Zimbabwe for the first time in 2023 as part of the commentary team for the 2023 Cricket World Cup Qualifier, while Olonga has yet to return, instead settling in Adelaide, Australia.

== Legacy ==
Both players were awarded an Honorary Life Membership of the Marylebone Cricket Club, an honour usually only given to players who have retired from first-class cricket. In 2013, the BBC recorded a special radio programme commemorating 10 years of the protest.
