= List of England cricket team coaches =

The coach of the England men’s national cricket team was a position first filled in 1986. There have been ten Test coaches and twelve one-day/T20 coaches in total, excluding interim appointment Paul Collingwood in 2022. All ten coaches to have held the Test role have also covered the limited overs formats for at least some of their tenure, including Peter Moores holding the combined position twice, while two (Ashley Giles and Matthew Mott) solely performed the role for white-ball cricket.

The role usually entails selecting players for squads (often alongside a selection panel and/or chief selector), selecting the starting eleven and giving media interviews. Commonly referred to as coach, the role has in the past also been labelled as team manager or team director.

== List of England coaches ==
The following men have held the position of head coach of the England cricket team. Duncan Fletcher is the longest serving coach, having held the role for eight years, and Peter Moores is the only man to have held the position twice.

The position of coach of the Test team is currently vacant. Brendon McCullum, appointed in 2022, was sacked as Test team coach in July 2026. McCullum also took on the role of white-ball coach from January 2025. and retained the role after his sacking as Test team coach.

England head coach (Test team)			England head coach (ODI & T20 teams)		
Coach	Tenure	Country	Coach	Tenure	Country
Micky Stewart	1986–1992	England	Micky Stewart	1986–1992	England
Keith Fletcher	1992–1995	England	Keith Fletcher	1992–1995	England
Ray Illingworth	1995–1996	England	Ray Illingworth	1995–1996	England
David Lloyd	1996–1999	England	David Lloyd	1996–1999	England
Duncan Fletcher	1999–2007	Zimbabwe	Duncan Fletcher	1999–2007	Zimbabwe
Peter Moores	2007–2009	England	Peter Moores	2007–2009	England
Andy Flower	2009–2014	Zimbabwe	Andy Flower	2009–2012	Zimbabwe
Andy Flower	2009–2014	Zimbabwe	Ashley Giles	2012–2014	England
Peter Moores	2014–2015	England	Peter Moores	2014–2015	England
Trevor Bayliss	2015–2019	Australia	Trevor Bayliss	2015–2019	Australia
Chris Silverwood	2019–2022	England	Chris Silverwood	2019–2022	England
Paul Collingwood (interim)	2022	England	Paul Collingwood (interim)	2022	England
Brendon McCullum	2022–2026	New Zealand	Matthew Mott	2022–2024	Australia
Brendon McCullum	2022–2026	New Zealand	Brendon McCullum	2025–present	New Zealand

== Splitting the role ==
In 2012 Andy Flower resigned from his position of coach of the ODI and T20 teams, but remained in his role as coach of the Test team. Ashley Giles was appointed coach of the limited overs team but had no involvement in the Test team. Flower was the first of the two coaches to depart, with Ashley Giles being replaced as limited overs coach when Peter Moores was appointed as the roles were combined again. The role was split again after Chris Silverwood's departure in 2022 with the Test position going to Brendon McCullum and the white-ball role being taken by Matthew Mott. From January 2025 the roles were combined again as McCullum took over as white-ball coach. but split again from July 2026 when McCullum was sacked as Test team coach.

== Foreign coaches ==
Duncan Fletcher became the first foreign coach of the English cricket team (1999–2007), whilst his fellow Zimbabwean Andy Flower was head coach from 2009–2014. 2019 World Cup winning coach of the England team, Trevor Bayliss, is Australian. Brendon McCullum, Test coach from 2022 to 2026, is a New Zealander, and Matthew Mott, white-ball coach from 2022 to 2024, is from Australia.
