= Naved Latif =

Pakistani cricketer (born 1976)

Personal information
- Full name: Naved Latif
- Born: 21 February 1976 (age 50); Sargodha, Punjab, Pakistan
- Batting: Right-handed
- Bowling: Right-arm medium

International information
- National side: Pakistan (2001–2003)
- Only Test (cap 171): 31 January 2002 v West Indies
- ODI debut (cap 141): 31 October 2001 v Zimbabwe
- Last ODI: 10 October 2003 v South Africa

Career statistics
Competition	Test	ODI
Matches	1	11
Runs scored	20	262
Batting average	10.00	23.81
100s/50s	0/0	1/0
Top score	20	113
Balls bowled	–	48
Wickets	–	0
Bowling average	–	–
5 wickets in innings	–	–
10 wickets in match	–	–
Best bowling	–	–
Catches/stumpings	0/–	2/–
- Source: ESPNcricinfo, 4 February 2017

Naved Latif (born 21 February 1976) is a Pakistani former cricketer who played for the Pakistan national cricket team from 2001 to 2003. He was a right-handed batsman and a right-arm medium-pace bowler.

== Domestic career ==
Playing for Sargodha against Gujranwala in the 2000/01 Quaid-e-Azam Trophy, Latif scored 394 in exactly 13 hours. This was the highest first-class score made in Pakistan since Aftab Baloch's 428 at Karachi in 1973/74. It was also the tenth-highest score in the history of first-class cricket.

During 2004/05 he started playing Twenty20 cricket. He made a few appearances in the South Nottinghamshire League in Division 1 for Plumtree CC, before signing for Lahore Badshahs in the Indian Cricket League in early 2008.

== International career ==
He played in one Test match, against the West Indies in January/February 2002.

Latif made his ODI debut against Zimbabwe in 2001. He later made an outstanding century of 113 against Sri Lanka in his second ODI match. His last appearance in ODI cricket was in October 2003 against South Africa.

== See also ==
- One-Test wonder
