= Henry Olonga =

Zimbabwean cricketer

Personal information
- Full name: Henry Khaaba Olonga
- Born: 3 July 1976 (age 50); Lusaka, Zambia
- Batting: Right-handed
- Bowling: Right-arm fast
- Role: Bowler

International information
- National side: Zimbabwe (1995–2003)
- Test debut (cap 25): 31 January 1995 v Pakistan
- Last Test: 19 November 2002 v Pakistan
- ODI debut (cap 41): 21 October 1995 v South Africa
- Last ODI: 12 March 2003 v Kenya
- ODI shirt no.: 77

Domestic team information
- Years: Team
- 1993/94–1998/99: Matabeleland
- 2001/02: Mashonaland A
- 2002/03: Manicaland

Career statistics
Competition	Test	ODI	FC	LA
Matches	30	50	66	82
Runs scored	184	95	659	255
Batting average	5.41	7.30	9.98	10.62
100s/50s	0/0	0/0	0/0	0/0
Top score	24	31	45	32*
Balls bowled	4,502	2,059	10,048	3,311
Wickets	68	58	156	92
Bowling average	38.52	34.08	37.89	33.67
5 wickets in innings	2	2	3	2
10 wickets in match	0	0	0	0
Best bowling	5/70	6/19	5/70	6/19
Catches/stumpings	10/–	13/–	29/–	24/–
- Source: Cricinfo, 4 December 2016

Henry Khaaba Olonga (born 3 July 1976) is a Zimbabwean former cricketer who played Test and One Day International cricket for Zimbabwe. In domestic first-class cricket in Zimbabwe, Olonga played for Matabeleland, Mashonaland and Manicaland. When he made his Test debut in January 1995, he was the first black cricketer and the youngest person to play for Zimbabwe. He was a regular member of the Zimbabwe team from 1996 to 2003, playing in the World Cup in 1996, 1999 and 2003. During his playing days, he formed a rivalry against former Indian batsman Sachin Tendulkar whenever Zimbabwe and India played against each other in international cricket.

He was considered one of the fastest bowlers in international cricket, but also one of the more inaccurate, bowling many wides and no-balls. His international career came to an end in 2003 after Olonga and teammate Andy Flower wore black armbands during an international cricket match in the 2003 Cricket World Cup to "mourn the death of democracy" in Zimbabwe. Death threats forced him to live in exile in England. Olonga announced his retirement from international cricket after Zimbabwe's final game in the 2003 World Cup at the age of 26 when he was at the prime of his career. Olonga and Flower were given honorary life membership of the Marylebone Cricket Club (MCC) later in 2003. He and Flower were also honoured by the Cricket Writers' Club conferring on them the Peter Smith Memorial Award, given annually to acknowledge outstanding contributions to cricket.

== Early life ==
Olonga was born in Lusaka, Zambia. His father John Olonga, was a Kenyan surgeon and his mother was Rhodesian. He has two sisters and two brothers as well as ten half-brothers and sisters from his father's first marriage. Olonga, in his autobiography, reveled how his parents had to be separated temporarily when he was just four years old when his mother learned that her husband had hidden his first marriage from her. One of his brothers, Victor Olonga, played professional rugby and became captain of the Zimbabwe national team. His uncle is the former Kenyan minister Francis Masakhalia.

Soon after his birth, his family had returned to Kenya. After returning to Kenya, the family then moved to Bulawayo in Zimbabwe as his father intended to provide and ensure access to higher quality education for his children. Olonga was educated at Rhodes Estate Preparatory School (REPS) and began playing cricket at the age of eight and also played cricket for the Partridges, the Zimbabwe national primary schools cricket team. He then attended Plumtree School, where he became head boy. He was involved in acting, athletics and rugby in addition to cricket. He was nominated as one of the finalists in the search hunt for Zimbabwe's best high school actor for his performance as Charlie Davenport (a character which featured in the film 1950 film Annie Get Your Gun) while he was still the head boy.

In a school cricket match against Brighton College, he scored 103 runs and took 8 wickets for 15 runs. He found a firm Christian faith in 1992 at a youth camp in Marondera. He was also selected to play for Matabeleland in national primary schools cricket week.

== Domestic career ==
Olonga made his debut in first-class cricket in March 1994, aged 17, playing for Matabeleland against Mashonaland in the Logan Cup at Harare Sports Club. He took five wickets in the match, but had varied performances over the next couple of years. He continued to play domestic first-class cricket for Matabeleland until 1998–99 and then for Mashonaland A in 2001–02. Olonga later played for Manicaland in 2002–03.

== International career ==
He was not an obvious or automatic choice when he was selected to make his international debut for Zimbabwe in the Test against Pakistan in Harare in January 1995 (although Olonga could have been selected to play for Zimbabwe against Sri Lanka earlier in 1995, when David Brain and Eddo Brandes were absent due to injury, but he was found to be ineligible as he still held Kenyan nationality). It was revealed that his father was against Olonga's decision to pursue his career in cricket and wanted him to compete at the Olympics representing Kenya. However, Olonga refused his father's interest and did not give up his cricket ambitions. Having given up his Kenyan citizenship, Olonga became the youngest player to represent Zimbabwe in international cricket, aged 18 years and 212 days. He grew up watching the likes of Malcolm Marshall and Allan Donald and considers them as his childhood idols.

A right arm fast bowler, Olonga was also the first black cricketer to play for Zimbabwe and the third Zambian-born Test cricketer after Phil Edmonds and Neal Radford of England. Zimbabwe beat Pakistan by an innings and 64 runs, the team's first ever Test victory, mainly due to a double century from Grant Flower, as well as centuries from Andy Flower and Guy Whittall. Olonga took the wicket of Saeed Anwar in his first over, but he was no-balled once for throwing. With help from Dennis Lillee, he rebuilt his action at the MRF Pace Foundation before returning to international cricket. He was overlooked from Zimbabwe squad for the 1998 Commonwealth Games in September 1998. Thereafter, he began training harder with fellow seamer Heath Streak and got into the national team after remodelling his bowling action.

He made his debut in ODIs playing against South Africa in October 1995. He was man of the match when he took his first 5-wicket haul (5–70) in Tests, playing against India in October 1998, Zimbabwe's second Test victory. He was also the spearhead of the team that won Zimbabwe's first overseas Test, beating Pakistan in Peshawar in November 1998. Olonga took a second and final Test 5-wicket haul (5–93) in a losing cause against Pakistan in November 2002.

He played 30 Test matches for Zimbabwe, taking 68 wickets with a bowling average of 38.52. Olonga also played 50 One Day Internationals as well, taking 58 wickets at an average of 34.08. He holds the record for the best bowling in an ODI by a Zimbabwean, with figures of 6–19 against England in Cape Town in 2000.

=== Cricket World Cups ===
Olonga joined the Zimbabwe team at the 1996 Cricket World Cup in India, Pakistan and Sri Lanka. He was selected to play in Zimbabwe's final game of the competition, against India, but asked to be omitted as he was out of practice. He played in 7 matches in the 1999 Cricket World Cup in England. He was best known for his bowling spell against India at the 1999 Cricket World Cup where he took three wickets in the final over of the group stage match and eventually Zimbabwe created a massive upset by defeating India by a close margin of three runs. It was also Zimbabwe's first ever win against India in a World Cup match.

He was selected for the Zimbabwe team at the 2003 Cricket World Cup, held in South Africa, Zimbabwe and Kenya. Some of the countries playing in the tournament were concerned about security: New Zealand had refused to play in Nairobi and England refused to play in Harare.

== Black Armband Protest ==
Olonga and his teammate Andy Flower achieved international recognition by wearing a black armband in the match against Namibia at Harare Sports Club, to "mourn the death of democracy" in Zimbabwe under the government led by Robert Mugabe. Olonga and Flower released a statement on 10 February 2003, the second day of the tournament, stating in part:

In all the circumstances, we have decided that we will each wear a black armband for the duration of the World Cup. In doing so we are mourning the death of democracy in our beloved Zimbabwe. In doing so we are making a silent plea to those responsible to stop the abuse of human rights in Zimbabwe. In doing so, we pray that our small action may help to restore sanity and dignity to our nation

Flower scored 39 runs, Olonga conceded 8 runs from 3 overs but took no wickets as Zimbabwe won the match. Their protest was supported in the world press and more widely internationally, but caused a political storm in Zimbabwe. The minister of information Jonathan Moyo labelled Olonga an "Uncle Tom" with "a black skin and a white mask".

Despite the protest, Flower continued to play for Zimbabwe in the tournament, but Olonga was omitted from the team for six matches, ostensibly on grounds of his poor form (including a walkover against England who refused to travel to Harare). Olonga was selected to play in one more World Cup match, against Kenya in Bloemfontein in the Super Sixes stage of the tournament on 12 March. He was also expelled by the Takashinga Cricket Club branding him as "traitor" and it was revealed that his girlfriend also eventually broke up with him in a mail.

A warrant was issued in Zimbabwe for Olonga's arrest on charges of treason. Death threats made him go temporarily into hiding and then into exile in England after Zimbabwe's last match of the tournament, against Sri Lanka in East London. A knee injury forced his retirement from first-class cricket later in 2003, but he has played occasional matches since 2005 for the Lashings World XI. By 2010, he was calling for the restoration of international cricket between Zimbabwe and other countries.

== Beyond cricket ==
Olonga met physical education teacher Tara Read while both were attending the Australian Institute of Sport's cricket program in Adelaide. The couple married in 2004. Olonga had lived in exile in Britain for 12 years from 2003 to 2015 and then moved to Australia in 2015 along with his wife and his two children. His Zimbabwean passport expired in 2006 when he was living in exile in England and he could not leave England for another nine years. In 2023 he became an Australian citizen. In 2001, he composed the lyrics for the song Our Zimbabwe. He was also nicknamed as "Singing Seamer" by the English press following the release of Our Zimbabwe song.

On Friday 13 October 2006, Olonga won Five's The All Star Talent Show with 50% of the overall votes.

He is now pursuing a career as a cricket commentator and singer and released an album Aurelia in 2006. His autobiography, Blood, Sweat and Treason, was released in July 2010 by Vision Sports Publishing and was longlisted for the William Hill Sports Book of the Year 2010. In addition, he also served as a public speaker, photographer, art worker and author. After composing music, he made his singing debut in 2016 in a charity event performing Nessun dorma at the Sydney Cricket Ground.

In 2019, he entered as a contestant on the eighth season of The Voice Australia and performed Anthony Warlow's song "This Is the Moment" in the audition. He got three chair turns from Delta Goodrem, Boy George and Kelly Rowland. He chose Kelly Rowland as his coach and was eliminated in the Battle rounds. He was eliminated from the Voice Australia show after forgetting the lyrics of Elton John's "Can You Feel the Love Tonight." In an interview with Sportstar, he revealed that his singing career is his second innings of his life.

In August 2019, he joined the fundraiser of the African AIDS Foundation to raise funds for the organisation. He was appointed as global ambassador for Anglican Aid.

== Discography ==
=== Albums ===
Title	Album details
Aurelia	Released: 2006; Label: Ho Records; Format: CD

== See also ==
- Zimbabwean cricket crisis
- List of Test cricketers born in non-Test playing nations
