= Bertus Erasmus =

Zimbabwean cricketer (born 1977)

Personal information
- Full name: Albertus Johannes Erasmus
- Born: 17 December 1977 (age 48); Salisbury, Rhodesia
- Batting: Right-handed
- Bowling: Legbreak

Domestic team information
- Years: Team
- 1995: Young Mashonaland
- First-class debut: 10 March 1995 Mashonaland Under-24s v Matabeleland
- Last First-class: 17 November 1995 Young Mashonaland v Mashonaland

Career statistics
| Competition | First-class |
|---|---|
| Matches | 5 |
| Runs scored | 122 |
| Batting average | 17.42 |
| 100s/50s | 0/0 |
| Top score | 41 |
| Balls bowled | 635 |
| Wickets | 8 |
| Bowling average | 57.12 |
| 5 wickets in innings | 0 |
| 10 wickets in match | 0 |
| Best bowling | 3/31 |
| Catches/stumpings | 5/– |
- Source: CricketArchive, 25 January 2011

Albertus ("Bertus") Johannes Erasmus (born 17 December 1977 in Harare – then Salisbury) is a Zimbabwean cricketer. Erasmus captained the Zimbabwean Under-19 Test team in 1997, losing two games and drawing once against England. He has now given up cricket to become a chartered accountant.
