= Andy Flower =

Zimbabwean cricket player/coach

Andy Flower OBE
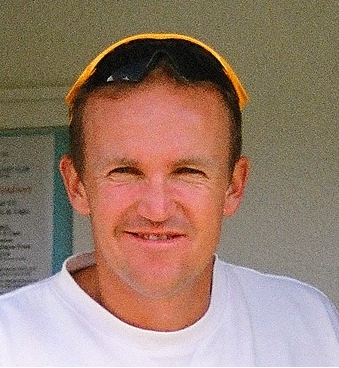

Personal information
- Full name: Andrew Flower
- Born: 28 April 1968 (age 58); Cape Town, Cape Province, South Africa
- Nickname: Petals; Flower Power (along with brother Grant)
- Height: 5 ft 10 in (1.78 m)
- Batting: Left-handed
- Bowling: Right-arm off break
- Role: Wicket-keeper

International information
- National side: Zimbabwe (1992–2003)
- Test debut (cap 6): 18 October 1992 v India
- Last Test: 16 November 2002 v Pakistan
- ODI debut (cap 20): 23 February 1992 v Sri Lanka
- Last ODI: 15 March 2003 v Sri Lanka
- ODI shirt no.: 33

Domestic team information
- Years: Team
- 1993/94–2002/03: Mashonaland
- 2002–2006: Essex
- 2003/04: South Australia

Head coaching information
- Years: Team
- 2009–2014: England
- 2020–2022: Saint Lucia Kings
- 2020–2023: Multan Sultans
- 2021–2025: Trent Rockets
- 2022–2023: Lucknow Super Giants
- 2024–present: Royal Challengers Bengaluru
- 2026–present: London Spirit
- 2022-2024: Gulf Giants

Career statistics
Competition	Test	ODI	FC	LA
Matches	63	213	223	380
Runs scored	4,794	6,786	16,379	12,511
Batting average	51.54	35.34	54.05	38.97
100s/50s	12/27	4/55	49/75	12/97
Top score	232*	145	271*	145
Balls bowled	3	30	629	132
Wickets	0	0	7	1
Bowling average	–	–	38.57	103.00
5 wickets in innings	–	–	0	0
10 wickets in match	–	–	0	0
Best bowling	–	–	1/1	1/21
Catches/stumpings	151/9	141/32	361/21	254/48
Medal record
Men's Cricket
Representing England (as manager)
T20 World Cup
Winner	2010 West Indies
- Source: Cricinfo, 13 November 2007

Andrew Flower OBE (born 28 April 1968) is a Zimbabwean cricket coach and a former cricketer. As a cricketer, he captained the Zimbabwe national cricket team and is widely regarded as the greatest Zimbabwean cricketer ever and one of the greatest wicket-keeper-batters of all time. He was Zimbabwe's wicket-keeper for more than 10 years and is, statistically, the greatest batsman the country has produced. His highest score in ODI cricket which was his 145 he made against India in the 2002 ICC Champions Trophy is also the highest score made by a Zimbabwe player at any tournaments. During his peak from October to December 2001, Flower was ranked as the best Test batsman in the world. He was widely acknowledged as the only Zimbabwe batsman of proper test quality in any conditions. After retirement, he served as the coach of the English cricket team from 2009 to 2014. Under his coaching, England won the 2010 ICC World Twenty20. Flower became the second foreign coach in the team's history. Currently, he is the head coach of London Spirit in The Hundred and Royal Challengers Bengaluru in the Indian Premier League.

Under his tenure, Flower led the Multan Sultans to their first playoffs in the 2020 season. The Sultans finished first in the league stage but ultimately lost in the preliminaries. Similarly, he led the Zouks to their first finals appearance in the CPL. Flower served as assistant coach to Kings XI Punjab (now Punjab Kings) for IPL 2020 and 2021 before joining Lucknow Super Giants as the head coach. In June 2021, he was inducted to the ICC Cricket Hall of Fame and became the first Zimbabwean to be inducted into ICC Hall of Fame. In August 2023, he was appointed as the head coach of Royal Challengers Bengaluru after his term ended with Lucknow Super Giants. Under his mentorship, RCB went on to win their first IPL title in 2025 and their second title in 2026.

== Playing career ==
Flower was born in Cape Town, South Africa, and starting from his high school days at Oriel Boys' High School and Vainona High School played most of his career alongside his younger brother Grant Flower. He is considered to be one of the best wicket-keeper batsmen of all time, alongside players such as MS Dhoni, Adam Gilchrist, Kumar Sangakkara, and Jeff Dujon. Flower made his international debut in a One Day International against Sri Lanka at New Plymouth, New Zealand, in the 1992 Cricket World Cup. A good player of spin, he made 550 runs in a Test series against India in 2000/01. This tally came in just four innings and he was only dismissed twice. He is one of the few players to score a century on ODI debut and became the first player ever to score a century on ODI debut in a World Cup match.

Flower played 63 Test matches for Zimbabwe, scoring 4,794 runs at an average of 51.54 and taking 151 catches and 9 stumpings, and 213 One Day Internationals, scoring 6,786 runs at an average of 35.34 and taking 141 catches and 32 stumpings. He holds the Zimbabwean records for the most Test career runs, the highest Test batting average, and most ODI career runs.

His aggregate score of 341 in the first Test against South Africa in 2001 is the second highest ever by a batsman on the losing side.

Andy Flower is also the only player to score an ODI hundred on debut in a world cup match. He also has the record for the most matches (149) to score his second ODI ton after scoring a century on debut, when he did it in only in his 150th ODI.

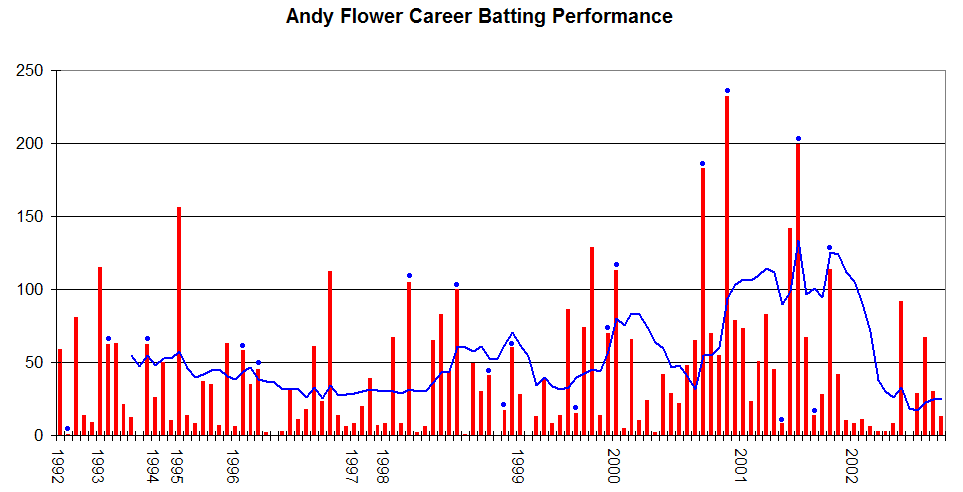
Andy Flower's career performance graph. The red bars indicate the player's Test match innings, while the blue line shows the average of the ten most recent innings at that point

He also holds the record for the highest ever Test score posted by a wicketkeeper batsman in an innings of a Test (232*). He is also the first and only wicketkeeper batsman to have a batting average of 50 in Test cricket. He along with Heath Streak set the record for the highest 7th wicket partnership for Zimbabwe in ODIs (130)

=== Black armband ===
Towards the end of his career, Flower achieved international recognition when he and teammate Henry Olonga wore black armbands during the 2003 Cricket World Cup match against Namibia to protest against Robert Mugabe's policies. He and Olonga released a statement on 10 February, stating in part:

In all the circumstances, we have decided that we will each wear a black armband for the duration of the World Cup. In doing so we are mourning the death of democracy in our beloved Zimbabwe. In doing so we are making a silent plea to those responsible to stop the abuse of human rights in Zimbabwe. In doing so, we pray that our small action may restore sanity and dignity to our Nation.

This act led to pressure from Zimbabwe's government, Flower's retirement from Zimbabwean cricket and exile from Zimbabwe itself, only briefly returning in 2023 as a commentator during the 2023 Cricket World Cup Qualifier. He later played an English county cricket season for Essex and an Australian domestic season for South Australia.

== Coaching career ==
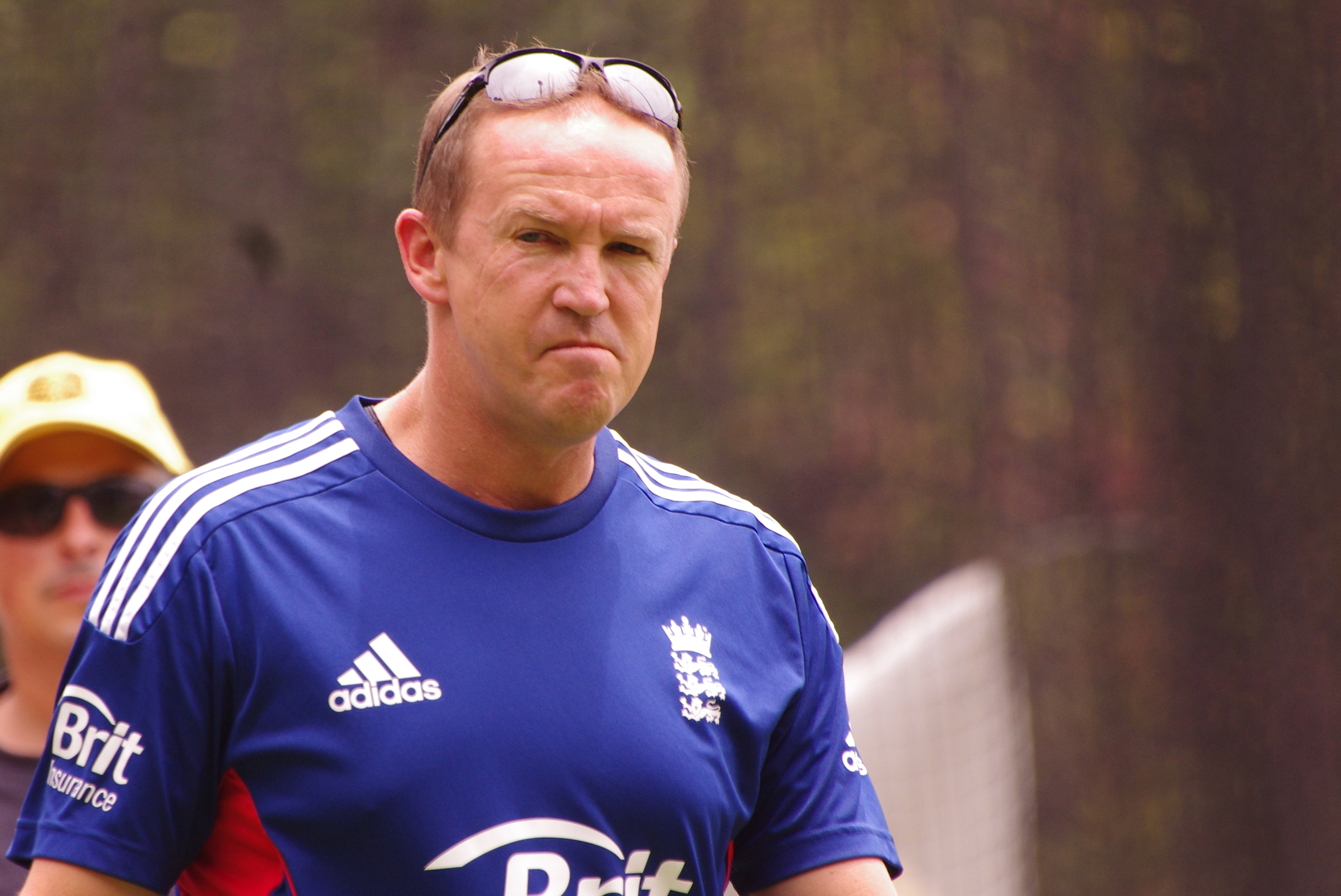
Flower in 2014 with the England cricket team

On 7 May 2007, Flower was appointed assistant coach of the England team, replacing Matthew Maynard. The Zimbabwean joined up with Peter Moores and the rest of the squad for the first Test match against the West Indies at Lord's on 17 May 2007. Upon his appointment to this role with the ECB, Flower, having not played that season due to injury, ended his playing spell at Essex, bringing his playing career to a close.

On 15 April 2009, following England's Caribbean tour, for which he was installed as interim team director following the departure of Peter Moores, he was appointed full-time team director. In the Summer of 2009, during his tenure as team director, England won The Ashes, beating Australia by two Test matches to one. In May 2010, they won the 2010 ICC World Twenty20 tournament in the West Indies. In November–January 2010/2011 England won the Ashes in Australia by three Test matches to one.

Flower was appointed Officer of the Order of the British Empire (OBE) in the 2011 Birthday Honours for services to sport.

On 13 August 2011, Flower led the England cricket team to become the number one ranked team in terms of test playing countries. On 22 December 2011, he was awarded the 2011 Coach of the Year in the BBC Sports Personality of the Year awards.

He also successfully led England to Ashes victory in July–August 2013 winning the test series 3–0.

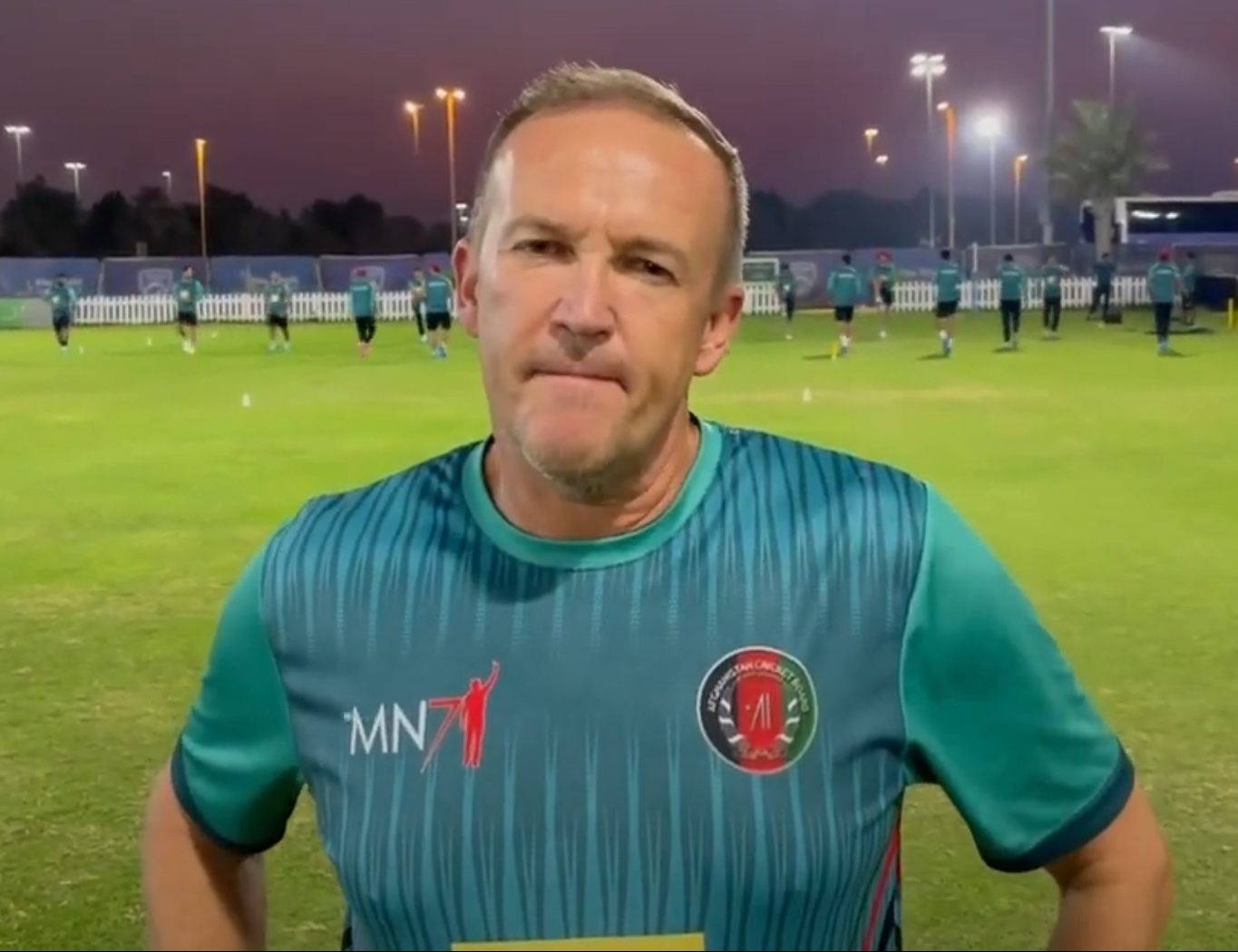
Flower in 2021 as the coaching consultant of the Afghanistan cricket team

A major blip in his coaching career was the 5–0 drubbing by Australia in November–January 2013 – 2014 Ashes series. On 31 January 2014, Flower stepped down as head coach, a position he had held for five years. From March 2014, he continued his employment with the England and Wales Cricket Board as its 'Technical Director of Elite Coaching', a role that has involved mentoring English county coaches and looking at best practice in coaching and performance in other organisations. Since July 2014, this role has also encompassed him being head coach of the England Lions team, most recently leading the side on an ODI tour of the UAE in January 2016. Later in 2016, he was appointed as a batting coach of Peshawar Zalmi.

In 2020, he was appointed as head coach for Multan Sultans, St Lucia Zouks and as Assistant coach for Kings XI Punjab in the IPL. In 2021 he was appointed as the head coach for Lucknow Super Giants.

In July 2022, He was appointed as head coach for Gulf Giants in International League T20. On 4 August 2023, He was appointed as head coach for Royal Challengers Bangalore in Indian Premier League. As head coach of Royal Challengers Bengaluru, Flower guided the franchise to consecutive IPL titles in 2025 and 2026.

== Charity ==
In September 2007, Flower became an ambassador for the children's charity, Hope for Children, and has assisted in raising thousands of pounds for needy children in Zimbabwe and around the world. In July 2011, Flower became an ambassador for the melanoma support group Melanoma UK, having suffered from the illness himself. He underwent surgery to remove a melanoma from his right eye in 2010. In the summer of 2012, Andy agreed to undertake another term as Ambassador to Melanoma UK. Having run the marathon in April 2012, Flower said, "It wasn't a hard decision for me to continue in my role as Ambassador to Melanoma UK. They do an excellent job in patient support, fundraising and raising awareness of the dangers of the sun. I wish them continued success in the coming years and who knows, another marathon might be on the cards!"

== Personal life ==
Flower met his wife Rebecca, who is English, when playing in England. They have three children. He has spoken about the adverse impact of time away from his family due to his cricket career.

The Daily Mirror reported in 2013 that Flower had become a British citizen.

Preceded by David Houghton	Zimbabwean national cricket captain 1993/4-5/6	Succeeded by Alistair Campbell
Preceded by Alistair Campbell	Zimbabwean national cricket captain 1999/2000-2000	Succeeded by Heath Streak
