= Swimming gala =

Amateur swimming competition

A swimming gala is a swimming competition between clubs or groups of swimmers, usually of young people. This term is primarily used in the United Kingdom, Hong Kong, and South Africa. In Australia swimming carnival is the norm.

== Overview ==
In the UK swimming galas are traditionally held at the end of the summer and through the autumn. Typical groups that compete at galas include schools, Girl Guides and Scouts other youth groups and between swimming clubs and between individual swimmers.

As well as the usual swimming events, there are sometimes more fun or unusual events such as swimming backwards or varieties of mixed relays and special races are often staged for the group leaders. This could also be extended to others as well as leaders many others will have a go at the race.

Swimming galas serve several purposes including competition, fund raising and social bonding.

There are a variety of galas, some of which are listed here. League galas are a set of galas (often three) between different clubs where in each race points are awarded, and whichever club get the most points win and get promoted to the next division. County galas are for individual swimmers that have achieved the qualifying times and wish to compete at a county level. After these come regional galas which have the same concept as county galas but for bigger areas so they have faster qualifying times. The next stage up are national galas which are for the best swimmers in the country. Open galas are galas hosted by clubs/organizations to raise money. Other galas include club galas which include swimmers from the same club competing against each other and galas hosted purely for fun.
