= Stuart Carlisle =

Zimbabwean cricketer

Personal information
- Full name: Stuart Vance Carlisle
- Born: 10 May 1972 (age 54); Salisbury, Rhodesia
- Batting: Right-handed
- Bowling: Right-arm medium
- Role: Batsman

International information
- National side: Zimbabwe
- Test debut (cap 24): 31 January 1995 v Pakistan
- Last Test: 15 August 2005 v New Zealand
- ODI debut (cap 39): 22 February 1995 v Pakistan
- Last ODI: 31 August 2005 v New Zealand

Career statistics
Competition	Test	ODI	FC	LA
Matches	37	111	96	155
Runs scored	1,615	2,740	5,399	4,003
Batting average	26.91	27.67	36.23	29.65
100s/50s	2/8	3/9	10/25	5/16
Top score	118	121*	219*	121*
Balls bowled	–	–	111	–
Wickets	–	–	0	–
Bowling average	–	–	–	–
5 wickets in innings	–	–	–	–
10 wickets in match	–	–	–	–
Best bowling	–	–	–	–
Catches/stumpings	34/–	39/–	70/–	58/–
- Source: ESPNcricinfo, 10 July 2015

Stuart Vance Carlisle (born 10 May 1972) is a former Zimbabwean cricketer who played 37 Test matches and 111 One Day Internationals for Zimbabwe. He also captained the team briefly, leading them in six Tests and 12 ODIs, and achieving a 2–3 result in an ODI series in India. He has the unique distinction of being the only Zimbabwean player to have scored both ODI and test century against Australia.

He was denied the opportunity and long rope of potentially being a prominent and integral member of the Zimbabwean team during his peak years due to the tensions he and fellow white players had with Zimbabwe Cricket. He was known for his unorthodox playing style in his short international career and was also lauded for being an athletic fielder during his playing days.

== International career ==
He made his test debut on 31 January 1995 against Pakistan and a month later he made his ODI debut against the same opponents on 22 February 1995. He was picked in Zimbabwe's squad for the 1999 Cricket World Cup.

During a triangular ODI series in 2001, he scored a quick-fire century and ended up with 119 off just 45 balls as he single-handedly helped Zimbabwe to chase the mammoth target of 304 set by Australia and Zimbabwe eventually fell short by just 2 runs.

Carlisle became the Zimbabwean captain in 2001 and Zimbabwe registered their first overseas test win in 17 years after defeating Bangladesh down under. After losing five out of six test matches, he lost the captaincy and was not picked for the 2003 Cricket World Cup.

A right batsman, he was often shuffled up and down the order. He was used a utility batsman who played in a number of positions in the lineup from no 1 to no 7 position and was never given a role clarity and was not given the perfect position where he can bat for a long time. Due to the instability of his batting position, he quite did not reach the true potential in international career which was cut short.

He made his maiden Test century in October 2003, against Australia at Sydney and despite his valiant efforts Zimbabwe lost the match by 9 wickets. He was also well known for his spirited knock of 109 against India in a VB ODI tri-nation series clash in 2004 where he along with Sean Ervine made a record breaking partnership worth 202 runs which propelled Zimbabwe to pull off an upset victory over India but ultimately Zimbabwe fell short by just 3 runs when chasing a target of 281. He along with Sean Ervine set the record for the highest 4th wicket partnership for Zimbabwe in ODIs (202).

After an unbeaten 103 in a test match against Bangladesh in early 2004, he became involved in the dispute with the Zimbabwean Cricket Board over the controversial sacking of Heath Streak. He was at the forefront of the 2004 strike which was sparked by Streak's sacking from captaincy and from national selection for complaining about alleged racism by selectors and politically motivated policies. He was one of the 15 contracted players to be fired from the team after showing support to ousted Heath Streak. As one of the rebel players he refused to play for Zimbabwe and after a brief return in 2005 he had had enough of the internal struggles and retired from all forms of the game. He revealed that he was fed up by the things which transpired within Zimbabwe Cricket and insisted that he was tired of the politics in Zimbabwe after announcing his retirement.

== Post cricket ==
After announcing his international retirement, he pursued his interest in sports manufacturing.

He also owns and runs Absolute Sports, a golf store attached to the Royal Harare Golf Club which hosts Zimbabwe Open.

Preceded by Brian Murphy	Zimbabwean national cricket captain 2001/2	Succeeded by Heath Streak
