= Brian Murphy (Zimbabwean cricketer) =

Zimbabwean cricketer (born 1976)

Personal information
- Born: 1 December 1976 (age 49); Salisbury, Rhodesia
- Batting: Right-handed
- Bowling: Legbreak, googly

Career statistics
Competition	Test	ODI	FC	LA
Matches	11	31	28	43
Runs scored	123	72	516	143
Batting average	10.25	8.00	20.64	10.21
100s/50s	0/0	0/0	-/2	-/-
Top score	30	20*	77	48
Balls bowled	2,153	1,422	5124	2030
Wickets	18	29	59	46
Bowling average	61.83	38.96	47.18	35.00
5 wickets in innings	0	0	–	–
10 wickets in match	0	0	–	–
Best bowling	3/32	3/43	4/71	3/43
Catches/stumpings	11/–	11/–	20/–	13/–
- Source: Cricinfo, 11 February 2006

Brian Andrew Murphy (born 1 December 1976) is a Rhodesian-born former Zimbabwean cricketer and a former captain of limited over cricket for Zimbabwe. He played his cricket for Mashonaland in Zimbabwe and Western Province in South Africa.

Murphy played 11 Test matches and 31 One Day Internationals for Zimbabwe, and was the surprise choice as captain when Heath Streak stepped down in 2001. However, after four ODIs and one Test he sustained a hand injury and relinquished the captaincy, which was awarded to Stuart Carlisle.

Murphy returned to international cricket after recovering from injury, playing in the 2003 Cricket World Cup before quitting Zimbabwe for England where he was offered a contract to play club cricket. He also took a job, coaching at the University of Cape Town in South Africa.

Preceded by Heath Streak	Zimbabwean national cricket captain 2001/2	Succeeded by Stuart Carlisle
