= Charitha Buddhika =

Sri Lankan cricketer (born 1980)

Personal information
- Full name: Thudellage Charitha Buddhika Fernando
- Born: 22 August 1980 (age 46); Panadura, Sri Lanka
- Batting: Right-handed
- Bowling: Right-arm fast-medium

International information
- National side: Sri Lanka (2001–2003)
- Test debut (cap 88): 13 November 2001 v West Indies
- Last Test: 28 July 2002 v Bangladesh
- ODI debut (cap 108): 26 October 2001 v Zimbabwe
- Last ODI: 7 April 2003 v Zimbabwe

Career statistics
Competition	Test	ODI
Matches	9	17
Runs scored	132	29
Batting average	26.39	7.25
100s/50s	0/0	0/0
Top score	45	14*
Balls bowled	1,270	700
Wickets	18	15
Bowling average	44.00	39.06
5 wickets in innings	0	1
10 wickets in match	0	0
Best bowling	4/27	5/67
Catches/stumpings	4/–	3/–
- Source: Cricinfo, 9 February 2017

Thudellage Charitha Buddhika Fernando (also known as Charitha Buddika; born 22 August 1980) is a former Sri Lankan cricketer, who played Tests and One Day International matches for the national side. He is a right-handed batsman and a right-arm medium-fast bowler.

== Early and domestic career ==
Charitha is a past student of St. John's College Panadura. He made his Twenty20 debut on 17 August 2004, for Colombo Cricket Club in the 2004 SLC Twenty20 Tournament.

== International career ==
Buddhika made a good One Day International debut, taking a wicket with his first legal delivery and finishing the match with figures of five wickets for 67 runs, the second-best bowling figures for a Sri Lankan player in their debut match, and the first Sri Lankan to do so in both the ODI format and in international cricket. He subsequently made his debut for the Sri Lankan Test team.

After nine Tests and some inconsistent performances he was dropped.

== See also ==
- List of bowlers who have taken a wicket with their first ball in a format of international cricket
