= 2003 NatWest Series =

- Part of Zimbabwean cricket team in England in 2003 and South African cricket team in England in 2003
- Date: 26 June–12 July 2003
- Location: England
- Result: England beat South Africa in the final
- Player of the series: Andrew Flintoff (Eng)
Teams
England	South Africa	Zimbabwe
Captains
Michael Vaughan	Graeme Smith	Heath Streak
Most runs
Marcus Trescothick (231)	Jacques Kallis (329)	Grant Flower (151)
Most wickets
James Anderson (11)	Makhaya Ntini (14)	Heath Streak (8)

The 2003 NatWest Series was a One Day International cricket tri-series sponsored by the National Westminster Bank that took place in England between 26 June and 12 July 2003. The series involved the national teams of England, South Africa and Zimbabwe. Ten matches were played in total, with each team playing one another thrice during the group stage. The teams which finished in the top two positions following the group stages qualified for the final, which England won by defeating South Africa at Lord's on 12 July by 7 wickets. Preceding the series, England played Zimbabwe in a two Test series, while following the series, South Africa played England in a Test and One Day International series.

== Venues ==
Nottingham	London	Canterbury	Leeds	Manchester
Trent Bridge; Capacity: 15,000	The Oval; Capacity: 23,500	St Lawrence Ground; Capacity: 15,000	Headingley; Capacity: 17,500	Old Trafford; Capacity: 15,000
2003 NatWest Series is located in England
Cardiff	Bristol	Birmingham	Southampton	London
Sophia Gardens; Capacity: 5,500	County Ground; Capacity: 16,000	Edgbaston; Capacity: 21,000	Rose Bowl; Capacity: 15,000	Lord's; Capacity: 28,000

== Squads ==
England	South Africa	Zimbabwe
Michael Vaughan (c); Kabir Ali; James Anderson; Rikki Clarke; Andrew Flintoff; Ashley Giles; Darren Gough; Steve Harmison; Richard Johnson; Rob Key; Anthony McGrath; Chris Read (wk); Vikram Solanki; Marcus Trescothick; Jim Troughton	Graeme Smith (c); Paul Adams; Nicky Boje; Mark Boucher (wk); Alan Dawson; Boeta Dippenaar; Herschelle Gibbs; Andrew Hall; Charl Langeveldt; André Nel; Makhaya Ntini; Shaun Pollock; Jacques Rudolph; Martin van Jaarsveld; Morné van Wyk	Heath Streak (c); Andy Blignaut; Gary Brent; Charles Coventry; Dion Ebrahim; Sean Ervine; Grant Flower; Travis Friend; Douglas Hondo; Dougie Marillier; Stuart Matsikenyeri; Ray Price; Richard Sims; Tatenda Taibu (wk)

== Fixtures ==
Team	Pld	W	L	CP	NR	Pts	NRR
South Africa	6	4	2	1	0	23	+0.480
England	6	3	2	2	1	22	+0.825
Zimbabwe	6	1	4	1	1	9	-1.370

26 June
Scorecard

England; 191/8 (50 overs)	v	Zimbabwe; 195/6 (48 overs)
Andrew Flintoff 53 (89); Heath Streak 2/30 (9 overs)		Grant Flower 96* (152); Richard Johnson 3/32 (10 overs)

Zimbabwe won by 4 wickets
Trent Bridge, Nottingham
Umpires: Simon Taufel (Aus) and Peter Willey (Eng)
Player of the match: Grant Flower (Zim)

- Zimbabwe won the toss and elected to field.
- Points: England 1; Zimbabwe 5

28 June
Scorecard

South Africa; 264/6 (50 overs)	v	England; 265/4 (45.5 overs)
Jacques Kallis 107 (133); Andrew Flintoff 3/46 (10 overs)		Marcus Trescothick 114 (125); Makhaya Ntini 2/56 (10 overs)

England won by 6 wickets
The Oval, London
Umpires: David Shepherd (Eng) and Simon Taufel (Aus)
Player of the match: Vikram Solanki (Eng)

- South Africa won the toss and elected to bat.
- Points: England 5; South Africa 1

29 June
Scorecard

South Africa; 272/5 (50 overs)	v	Zimbabwe; 226/9 (50 overs)
Jacques Kallis 125* (147); Douglas Hondo 2/29 (9.1 overs)		Travis Friend 82 (93); Andrew Hall 3/38 (9 overs)

South Africa won by 46 runs
St Lawrence Ground, Canterbury
Umpires: Billy Bowden (NZ) and Neil Mallender (Eng)
Player of the match: Jacques Kallis (SA)

- Zimbabwe won the toss and elected to field.
- Points: South Africa 5; Zimbabwe 1

1 July
Scorecard

England; 81/4 (16.3 overs)	v	Zimbabwe
Michael Vaughan 35* (45); Sean Ervine 2/20 (3 overs)

No result
Headingley, Leeds
Umpires: David Shepherd (Eng) and Simon Taufel (Aus)

- Zimbabwe won the toss and elected to field.
- The match was reduced to 25 overs per side before the start of play.
- Points: England 3; Zimbabwe 3

3 July
Scorecard

England; 223/7 (50 overs)	v	South Africa; 227/3 (47.3 overs)
Marcus Trescothick 60 (92); Makhaya Ntini 3/38 (8 overs)		Jacques Kallis 82* (105); Andrew Flintoff 1/33 (9.3 overs)

South Africa won by 7 wickets
Old Trafford, Manchester
Umpires: Billy Bowden (NZ) and Neil Mallender (Eng)
Player of the match: Jacques Kallis (SA)

- England won the toss and elected to bat.
- Points: England 1; South Africa 5

5 July
Scorecard

Zimbabwe; 174/8 (50 overs)	v	South Africa; 175/1 (34.2 overs)
Heath Streak 54 (72); Jacques Kallis 3/47 (10 overs)		Herschelle Gibbs 93* (97); Sean Ervine 1/13 (2.2 overs)

South Africa won by 9 wickets
Sophia Gardens, Cardiff
Umpires: Simon Taufel (Aus) and Peter Willey (Eng)
Player of the match: Herschelle Gibbs (SA)

- South Africa won the toss and elected to field.
- Points: South Africa 6; Zimbabwe 0

6 July
Scorecard

Zimbabwe; 92 (24.5 overs)	v	England; 95/4 (17.5 overs)
Stuart Matsikenyeri 26 (35); Darren Gough 4/26 (9 overs)		Andrew Flintoff 47* (37); Heath Streak 4/21 (9 overs)

England won by 6 wickets
Bristol County Ground, Bristol
Umpires: Billy Bowden (NZ) and Neil Mallender (Eng)
Player of the match: Andrew Flintoff (Eng)

- England won the toss and elected to field.
- Points: England 6; Zimbabwe 0

8 July
Scorecard

South Africa; 198/9 (50 overs)	v	England; 199/6 (39 overs)
Graeme Smith 45 (39); James Anderson 4/38 (10 overs)		Michael Vaughan 83 (115); Makhaya Ntini 2/30 (6 overs)

England won by 4 wickets
Edgbaston, Birmingham
Umpires: David Shepherd (Eng) and Simon Taufel (Aus)
Player of the match: Andrew Flintoff (Eng)

- England won the toss and elected to bat.
- Points: England 6; South Africa 0

10 July
Scorecard

Zimbabwe; 173/8 (50 overs)	v	South Africa; 174/3 (35.2 overs)
Heath Streak 50* (90); Makhaya Ntini 4/45 (10 overs)		Jacques Rudolph 69* (97); Douglas Hondo 2/25 (7 overs)

South Africa won by 7 wickets
Rose Bowl, Southampton
Umpires: Billy Bowden (NZ) and David Shepherd (Eng)
Player of the match: Makhaya Ntini (SA)

- Zimbabwe won the toss and elected to bat.
- Points: South Africa 6; Zimbabwe 0

=== Final ===
12 July
Scorecard

South Africa; 107 (32.1 overs)	v	England; 111/3 (20.2 overs)
Jacques Rudolph 19 (40); James Anderson 3/50 (10 overs)		Vikram Solanki 50 (58); Andrew Hall 1/14 (2.2 overs)

England won by 7 wickets
Lord's, London
Umpires: Neil Mallender (Eng) and Simon Taufel (Aus)
Player of the match: Darren Gough (Eng)

- England won the toss and elected to field.

In what was South Africa's first One Day International appearance at Lord's, England won the toss and elected to field. For many of the South African batsman this was their first time playing on the sloping Lord's pitch, which at the start of their innings had a little moisture in and displayed even bounce. South Africa lost their captain Graeme Smith with the score on 10, dismissed by James Anderson, and soon lost Herschelle Gibbs for 9 with the score on 30. Debutant Morné van Wyk made a quickfire 17 before he was bowled by James Anderson, in what was described as the "ball of the match". Jacques Kallis came into the match with a series average of 164.50, but was dismissed for a 12 ball duck by Darren Gough, who was England's most economical bowler, with his opening spell of 7 overs conceding just 9 runs. Wickets continued to fall at regular intervals during the South African innings, with Andrew Flintoff, Ashley Giles and Gough each chipping in with two wickets, while Richard Johnson took one. James Anderson was the only England bowler to bowl his full complement of 10 overs, finishing with figures of 3/50. Jacques Rudolph top-scored in South Africa's innings with 19. South Africa were eventually dismissed for 107, with their innings lasting just 32.1 overs. This score was at the time the lowest One Day International in the 34 matches played there and remains so to this day. England's response started poorly, with Makhaya Ntini dismissing Marcus Trescothick for a nine ball duck with the score on 1. However, South Africa could not capitalise on this, with Michael Vaughan and Vikram Solanki adding 87 for the second wicket, before Vaughan was dismissed for 30 by André Nel and Solanki was dismissed by Andrew Hall one run later for 50, however by then the damage had been done. Anthony McGrath and Flintoff proceeded to lead England home to a 7 wicket victory. Following the match Flintoff was declared Man of the Series.

== Statistics ==
Most runs		Most wickets	
(South Africa) Jacques Kallis	329	(South Africa) Makhaya Ntini	14
(England) Marcus Trescothick	231	(England) James Anderson	11
(South Africa) Jacques Rudolph	227	(England) Andrew Flintoff	10
(South Africa) Graeme Smith	223	(England) Darren Gough	9
(England) Andrew Flintoff	210	(Zimbabwe) Heath Streak	8
