= Brendon McCullum =

New Zealand cricketer (born 1981)

Brendon McCullum ONZM
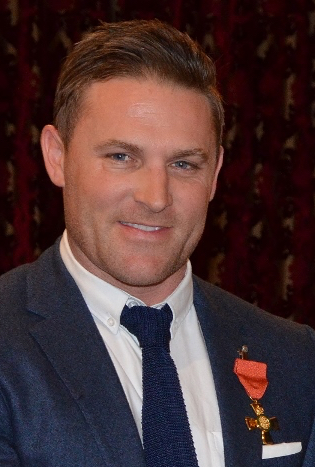
- McCullum in 2015

Personal information
- Full name: Brendon Barrie McCullum
- Born: 27 September 1981 (age 45); Dunedin, Otago, New Zealand
- Nickname: Baz
- Height: 1.71 m (5 ft 7 in)
- Batting: Right-handed
- Bowling: Right-arm medium Right-arm off break
- Role: Wicket-keeper-batter
- Relatives: Nathan McCullum (brother); Stuart McCullum (father)

International information
- National side: New Zealand (2002–2016)
- Test debut (cap 224): 10 March 2004 v South Africa
- Last Test: 20 February 2016 v Australia
- ODI debut (cap 126): 17 January 2002 v Australia
- Last ODI: 8 February 2016 v Australia
- ODI shirt no.: 42
- T20I debut (cap 5): 17 February 2005 v Australia
- Last T20I: 23 June 2015 v England
- T20I shirt no.: 42

Domestic team information
- Years: Team
- 1999/00–2002/03; 2007/08–2014/15: Otago
- 2003/04–2006/07: Canterbury
- 2006: Glamorgan
- 2008–2010,2012–2013: Kolkata Knight Riders
- 2008/09: New South Wales
- 2010: Sussex
- 2011: Kochi Tuskers Kerala
- 2011/12–2018/19: Brisbane Heat
- 2014–2015: Chennai Super Kings
- 2015: Warwickshire
- 2016–2017: Gujarat Lions
- 2016–2017: Middlesex
- 2016–2018: Trinbago Knight Riders
- 2017–2018: Lahore Qalandars
- 2017: Rangpur Riders
- 2018: Royal Challengers Bangalore
- 2018: Kandahar Knights

Head coaching information
- Years: Team
- 2020–2022: Kolkata Knight Riders
- 2022–: England
- 2019-2020: Trinbago Knight Riders

Career statistics
Competition	Test	ODI	T20I	FC
Matches	101	260	71	150
Runs scored	6,453	6,083	2,140	9,210
Batting average	38.64	30.41	35.66	37.13
100s/50s	12/31	5/32	2/13	17/46
Top score	302	166	123	302
Balls bowled	175	–	–	259
Wickets	1	–	–	1
Bowling average	88.00	–	–	140.00
5 wickets in innings	0	–	–	0
10 wickets in match	0	–	–	0
Best bowling	1/1	–	–	1/1
Catches/stumpings	198/11	262/15	36/8	308/19
Medal record
Men's Cricket
Representing New Zealand
ICC Cricket World Cup
Runner-up	2015 Australia and New Zealand
ICC Champions Trophy
Runner-up	2009 South Africa
- Source: ESPNcricinfo, 7 November 2021

Brendon Barrie McCullum ONZM (born 27 September 1981) is a New Zealand cricket coach and former player who is the head coach of the England men's cricket team in T20s and ODIs, and formerly Test matches until his sacking as England Test coach in July 2026. Representing New Zealand, he captained the team in all formats. McCullum was renowned for his quick scoring, notably setting a record for the fastest Test century. He is considered one of New Zealand's most successful batsmen and captained the team to the finals of the 2015 Cricket World Cup and 2009 ICC Champions Trophy. He is also an inductee of the New Zealand Cricket Hall of Fame.

McCullum is the former leading run scorer in Twenty20 International (T20I) cricket and was the first player to score 2000 runs in T20Is. His innings of 123 against Bangladesh in the 2012 ICC World Twenty20 was the highest score made by a New Zealand cricketer in the format and he was the first New Zealander to score a triple hundred in a Test match, 302 runs against India in February 2014. In 2014, he also became the first New Zealander to score 1,000 Test runs in a calendar year and in his final Test match in February 2016 he scored the fastest Test century, reaching his hundred in 54 balls. McCullum was the first batsman to score two T20I centuries.

On 22 December 2015, McCullum announced he would retire from international cricket at the end of the southern summer, joining his brother Nathan McCullum who had earlier that year announced his retirement from all forms of cricket. He retired from international duty on 24 February 2016 and from all forms of cricket in August 2019.

== Domestic career ==
On 3 March 2008, before facing England for the test series, McCullum was involved in the State Shield Final versus the Auckland Aces, scoring 170 runs for the Otago Volts to help beat the Aces at Eden Park's outer oval, and helped to chase down a daunting total of 7 for 310, he broke multiple State Shield batting records. He scored the fastest LA hundred off 52 balls, including 14 fours and 5 sixes. With 170 runs in the match, McCullum scored the highest score by any player in a domestic one-day match (Shell or State competitions) overtaking Blair Hartland's previous record.

McCullum played for Glamorgan in 2006 and he scored 160 opening the batting against Leicestershire in the County Championship. On 24 January 2009, he lined up for New South Wales in the final of Australia's KFC Twenty20 Big Bash. This was an exercise to allow him to be eligible to play for them in the Twenty20 Champions League. This sparked criticism however despite opinion States are permitted to have one overseas player in their squad. McCullum also donated his match fee from the game to Otago Junior Cricket.

On 16 January 2010 during the 2009-10 HRV Cup, vs Auckland Aces at University Oval, McCullum hit 108 not out off 67 deliveries, which included 10 fours and four sixes to lead Otago Volts to victory with three balls to spare. McCullum reached his 50 off 32 deliveries and his century off 65 deliveries.

While playing for Warwickshire in the 2015 T20 Blast McCullum hit what was at the time the highest score in England's domestic T20 cup, 158* from just 64 balls. The innings remains the highest T20 score by a batsman at Edgbaston. Following his announcement to retire from international cricket in 2015, he signed with Middlesex for the 2016 NatWest T20 Blast, a blow for Warwickshire who had hoped he would return to them

In September 2016 he signed with the Lahore Qalandars for the 2017 season of the Pakistan Super League and will be the team's captain.

In the inaugural Indian Premier League tournament in 2008 he played for Kolkata Knight Riders. On 18 April 2008 in the first-ever IPL match, he achieved the highest Twenty20 individual score in an innings, 158* against RCB. This eclipsed the previous record mark of 141, held by Australian Cameron White. Coincidentally, McCullum faced an over from White during the match and scored 24 from it; it was White's only over in that match. This record was eventually broken by Chris Gayle when he piled on 175 runs in IPL 2013. In the same match he also claimed the record for most sixes (13) in a Twenty20 innings, which was later surpassed by Englishman Graham Napier (16).

He was bought by Kochi Tuskers Kerala in the 2011 IPL auctions. He returned to the Knight Riders in 2012. In the 2014 IPL auctions, McCullum was bought by Chennai Super Kings. He was given the role of opening the innings along with West Indian Dwayne Smith and the pair was considered the most dangerous opening pair in the league's history. In 2018 he was released by CSK and bought by Royal Challengers Bangalore in 2018.

During the RCB's season opener against Kolkata Knight Riders during the 2018 IPL season, he reached 9000 runs in all forms of T20 cricket and became only the second player after Chris Gayle to achieve the milestone.

== International career ==
In 2004, McCullum played in a Test series against England and scored 96 runs at Lord's. His maiden Test century came several months later when he scored 143 against Bangladesh. He fell just short of his second Test hundred in a game against Sri Lanka when dismissed one short of his hundred. His second century would later come with a run a ball 111 against Zimbabwe.

He was selected in the 20-man ICC World XI squad for the ICC Super Series in July 2005. On 20 February 2007, he scored 86 not out as New Zealand went on to be the first team to whitewash Australia in a three-match ODI series since 1997. During the innings he partnered with Craig McMillan to score 165, equalling the world record for a 6th wicket partnership.

On 31 December 2007, he scored 50 from just 19 balls against Bangladesh. He finished his innings with 80 runs from only 28 balls, including 9 fours and 6 sixes with a strike rate of 285.71.

=== Record breaking ===
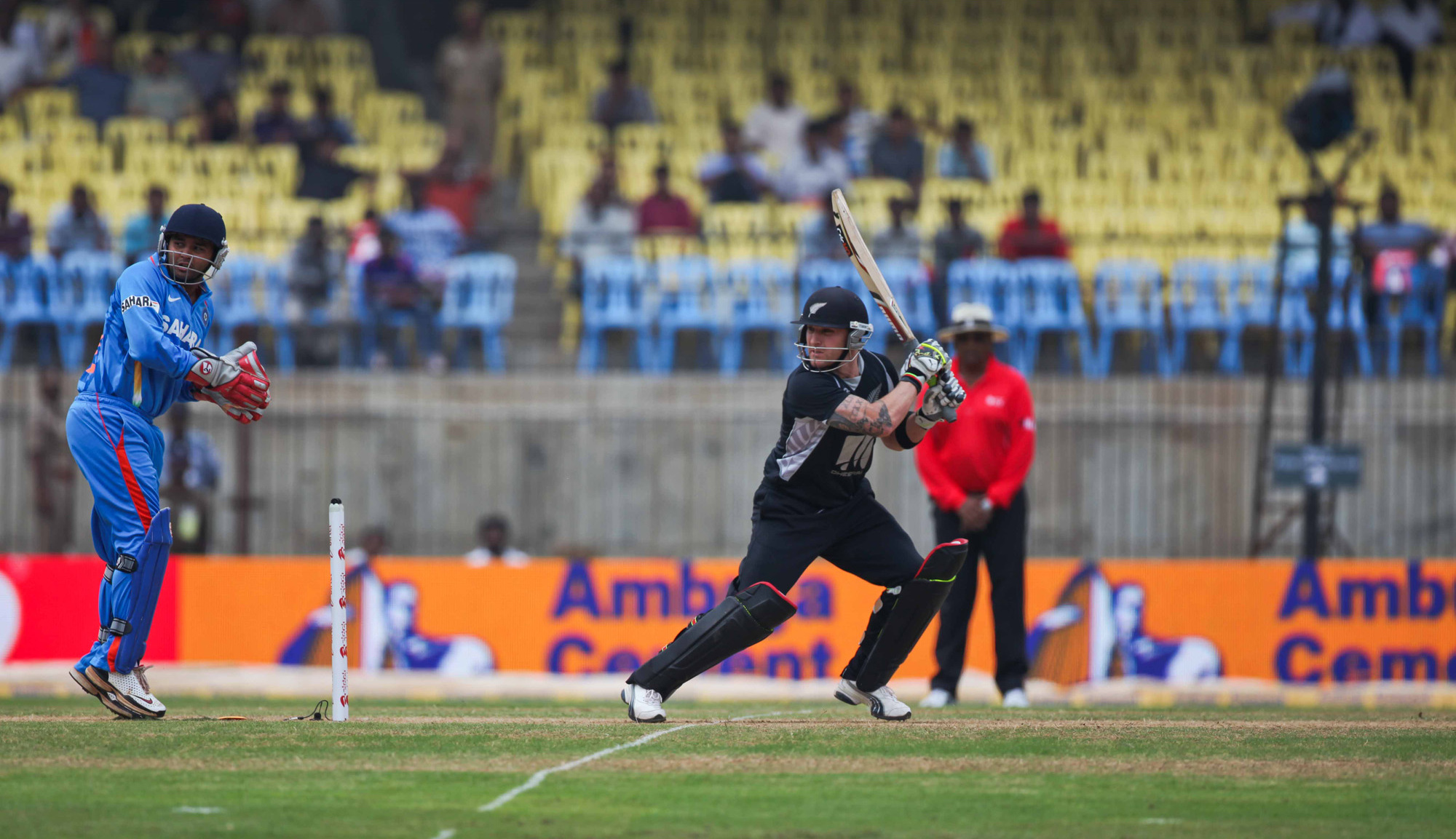
McCullum batting against India in an ODI in December 2010

On 1 July 2008, McCullum scored his maiden ODI century, a 135-ball 166, against Ireland in the Associates Tri-Series in Scotland. His century, along with James Marshall's 161, (his maiden ODI century in his last appearance, in which he shared in a 266 opening stand with McCullum which is the highest ODI partnership for any wicket in Black Caps history and the second highest opening partnership in all ODIs.) and Ross Taylor's 59, elevated New Zealand to 402, the highest and their only 400+ score for their team until date, and they won by 290 runs, setting a world record for the biggest margin of victory by runs, a record that stood until 2023.

On 6 November 2009, against Pakistan at Abu Dhabi, McCullum scored his second ODI century of 131 to elevate New Zealand to 303 and win the match to level the series. On 16 February 2010, during the only Test match against Bangladesh, he scored 185, which is the highest score ever by a New Zealand wicket-keeper in Test cricket. He was also involved in the record highest sixth-wicket partnership for New Zealand of 339 runs with Martin Guptill, missing out on the world record by just 12 runs.

On 27 February 2010, McCullum became the second player to score a T20I hundred, finishing 116 not out, one run short of Chris Gayle's record of 117. On 4 May 2010 McCullum became the first player to score 1,000 T20 international runs. He achieved this feat playing against Zimbabwe in the 2010 ICC World Twenty20 at Guyana.

On 28 June 2010, McCullum announced that he would not keep wicket for New Zealand in Test matches. He, however, informed that he will still keep in 50-overs & T20 over games. He did a fine job in his first innings since handing over the wicketkeeping duties he scored 65 runs and was engaged in a 104 run partnership with Ross Taylor he was promoted to the position of opener in tests rather than his usual number 5 position. McCullum did however have experience of opening the innings because he opens for New Zealand in limited-overs cricket.

On 21 September 2012 at the 2012 ICC World Twenty20 tournament in Sri Lanka, McCullum scored 123 runs against Bangladesh at Pallekele, setting a new record for the highest Twenty20 International innings, and becoming the first player to score two Twenty20 International centuries. This record was broken by Aaron Finch against England, when he scored 156. However, McCullum is one of the two players to have scored two Twenty20 International centuries along with West Indian Chris Gayle.

He was awarded the T20 Player of the Year by NZC for the 2012–13 season.

=== Captaincy ===
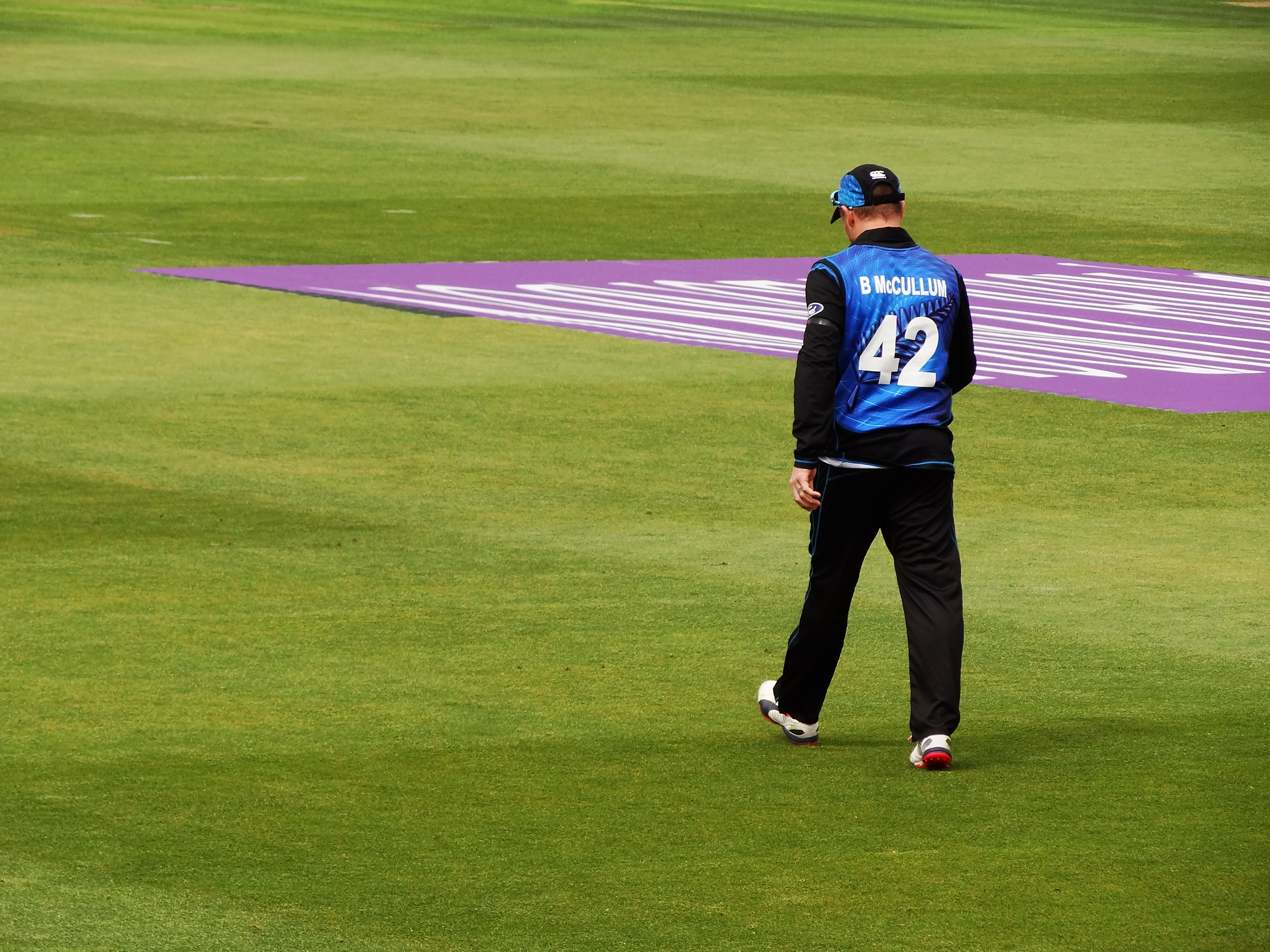
McCullum playing in an ODI against England in 2015

In 2014 at the Basin Reserve in Wellington, McCullum scored 302 runs in the third innings of the second test against India, becoming the first New Zealand batsman to score a triple-century. He shared a 352 run partnership with BJ Watling, then a record sixth wicket stand, rescuing New Zealand from a likely innings defeat. McCullum closed the innings at 680/8d, both the highest ever innings by New Zealand, and the highest ever third innings in Test cricket history.

On 21 November 2014, McCullum took his first-ever wicket at test level, a caught-and-bowled of Pakistan's Sarfraz Ahmed during their second test. On 29 November 2014, McCullum scored a century on day 2 of the third test against the same opposition, in which both teams decided to call off play on the day before as a tribute to Phillip Hughes, and hand-written P.H. under each player's squad number as a further mark of respect. He was bowled out on 202 after hitting eleven sixes in his innings, by far a record for New Zealand opening batsman. Two years after his debut as NZ captain, in which the team was bowled out for a paltry 45, Black Caps returned to respectability.

On 13 December 2014, McCullum was named New Zealander of the Year by the New Zealand Herald beating out stiff competition from Lane Pilkington due to his continued co-operation with ICC over the match-fixing scandal which resulted in Chris Cairns being charged for lying to court, and also for changing the perception of the Black Caps as easy-beats.

On the first day of the Boxing Day Test at Hagley Oval, McCullum scored 195 in the first innings against Sri Lanka, which gave him 1000 test runs in a calendar year, becoming the first New Zealander to reach this milestone (1164 at the end of the match, with Kane Williamson at 929), and the fastest test century (in 74 balls), beating his own record against Pakistan in Sharjah. He fell 5 runs shy of his 4th 200+ scores in a calendar year. His 33 sixes in test cricket in a single calendar year is also a world record. It is also worth noting that New Zealand only played 9 test matches in 2014. He also helped to push New Zealand to score 429/7 on day one, the most runs New Zealand had ever scored in a single day of play in test cricket. It ended with an 8-wicket win, which made it 5 test wins out of 9 in 2014, the most wins in a calendar year. He also closed the year with a triple century and two double centuries, the third person to do so after Donald Bradman and Michael Clarke.

On 3 January 2015 McCullum returned to Basin Reserve, where he scored his triple century against India. While he got a 2-ball duck on a green pitch and three errors as a fielder, he was given a key to Wellington, a symbolic equivalent of "Honorary Citizen", in recognition of his heroics the previous year, becoming the third person to receive the honour after Wellington-born Sir Peter Jackson and Sir Richard Taylor, who were recognised by the city for their work on the Lord of the Rings movies.

For his performances in the 2014–15 season, he won the Sir Richard Hadlee Medal.

=== Late career ===
McCullum also led New Zealand in the 2015 Cricket World Cup, which was co-hosted by New Zealand and Australia. On 20 February 2015, in New Zealand's third Pool A match against England, McCullum scored 77 runs off 25 balls, recording the fastest 50 in World Cup history (51 runs off 18 balls) and the 4th fastest fifty of all time. McCullum led the New Zealand team to their first World Cup final, scoring timely innings in the pool match against Australia and South Africa in the semi-final. The semi-final victory was New Zealand's first after six semi-final losses in the past. In the final against Australia, McCullum was bowled for a duck in just the first over of the match by Mitchell Starc, as New Zealand went on to lose to Australia by 7 wickets. Over the course of the tournament, McCullum was particularly aggressive in both batting as well as his captaincy, contributing to New Zealand reaching the finals. His aggressive starts against the strike bowlers of the opposition team such as James Anderson, Mitchell Johnson, and Dale Steyn favoured the rest of the players to play their natural game.

On 21 May 2015, McCullum started in his 93rd consecutive test, and batted in his preferred spot at no. 5. On 13 December 2015, on McCullum's 98th consecutive test start, he scored his 100th six hit in test cricket, tying the record by Adam Gilchrist. On 12 February 2016, McCullum started his 100th consecutive test, but was dismissed in both innings by Mitchell Marsh, making Marsh the second person since Jason Gillespie to dismiss him on both innings of 2 test matches.

On 22 December 2015, McCullum announced his intention to retire from international cricket at the end of the southern summer in his home test against Australia, rather than after the 2016 ICC World Twenty20. He played his last ODI match against Australia on 8 February 2016 in which he scored 47 off 27 and New Zealand beat Australia by 55 runs thereby winning the Chappell–Hadlee Trophy 2–1.

On 20 February 2016, against Australia, at the Hagley Oval, in his adopted home of Christchurch, McCullum commenced his final Test, the only player left from the last Trans-Tasman Test in Christchurch (held in the pre-earthquake AMI Stadium). The third day of the Test was the fifth anniversary of the 2011 Christchurch earthquake. On the first day, in New Zealand's first innings, he hit his 102nd career six to surpass Adam Gilchrist as the most prolific six-hitter in Test cricket, going on to score a century off 54 balls, beating by two balls the record for the fastest Test century previously held jointly by Viv Richards and Misbah-ul-Haq. He also became the second player (after Jason Gillespie) to score a hundred or more in his final Test, the highest runs (170) scored by a captain in his farewell Test, and the first captain to score a ton in farewell Test. He also took four catches as a fielder at first slip, deputising for the injured Ross Taylor. On day three, 22 February 2016, in the second innings, his last in Tests, he scored 25 off 27 balls, when he was dismissed by Josh Hazlewood one ball after hitting him for a six. McCullum was given a guard of honour onto the field, and a standing ovation once dismissed. He said that the time was right to quit international cricket, and that in his time as captain he hoped he had brought some fun, enjoyment and real culture back into the set-up.

In September 2018, he was named as the Icon Player for Kandahar's squad in the first edition of the Afghanistan Premier League tournament.

In July 2019, he was selected to play for the Glasgow Giants in the inaugural edition of the Euro T20 Slam cricket tournament. However, in August 2019 he retired from all forms of cricket.

== Playing style ==
McCullum originally played in the team as a wicketkeeper-batsman. His glove work improved during his tenure as the New Zealand wicketkeeper. His batting is good enough to earn him selection for the Black Caps alone, shown by the occasions on which he has been unable to keep but has still been selected as a batsman. He opens the batting for New Zealand in ODIs with steadily improving success. He is an aggressive batsman who is particularly strong over extra cover, often lofting the ball into the stands, and also square-cutting, or square-driving the ball. He is also adept at using the scoop shot, even using it at tests, so much so that McScoop was named after him. In 2010 McCullum hung up the gloves In Test cricket due to continued body strain and became a specialist batsmen in Test cricket, opening the innings in his first match as a specialist batsmen against India in Ahmedabad. He was described as a player "especially suited to Twenty20 cricket" when he signed for a five-week stint at Glamorgan in June 2006. The stint included the entire domestic 2006 Twenty20 Cup. He was signed up by the Kolkata Knight Riders of the IPL for $700,000. His contract with the IPL was for three years. In 2016, he was signed by the replacement/expansion team Gujarat Lions for US$1.1 million, making him the highest paid overseas player in the team's foundation squad.

He has the ability to play the Dilscoop (which was invented by Sri Lankan Tillakaratne Dilshan) or precisely the ramp shot, which involves the batsman squatting down and scooping deliveries back over the wicketkeeper's area. The two shots have their own distinction, where Dilscoop is played right above the wicket-keeper's head, but ramp shot can be played in sideways of the wicket-keeper as well. Playing this ramp shot in a Twenty20 International match on 28 February 2010 in Lancaster Park, against Australia, he managed to hit Shaun Tait for two sixes in an over back over Brad Haddin's head, forcing Australia to set a back stop (the fielder near the boundary behind the wicketkeeper or first slip) in his final test match. He can also execute reverse sweep well. He also likes to cut, cover drive, or advance the wicket to punch the ball up for boundaries from a batting stance standing on or outside leg stump.

During the Twenty20 World Championship in 2009, the wicketkeeping duties was given to Peter McGlashan. He was seen practicing his medium bowling. McCullum had to decide whether to play for New South Wales, KKR, or Otago in the 1st edition of the Champions League Twenty20. Since KKR did not qualify, he had only to consider playing for either New South Wales or Otago; eventually he had decided to play for Otago alongside brother Nathan McCullum.

In 2012, BJ Watling became McCullum's replacement as wicketkeeper in Tests, but due to Luke Ronchi's struggles in ODIs, McCullum still remained as wicketkeeper in ODIs and T20s. But by late 2013, McCullum's recurring back problems meant he can no longer perform wicketkeeping duties effectively, he gave up his gloves to Ronchi in ODIs and T20s, and McCullum became a middle order batsman, or as a cover for opening the batting in tests, having batted at 1,2,5–7 in his career, while his fielding position becomes predominantly mid-off, mid-on or mid-wicket, and in his final international matches, he ended at first slip after the injury to Ross Taylor. He is also a very seldom-used part-time medium pace bowler in tests. He got his first wicket in all forms of international cricket from a caught-and-bowled against Sarfraz Ahmed of Pakistan which ended their first innings in 2014. McCullum was picked for 2015 ICC Cricket World Cup as an opening batsman due to inconsistencies from Martin Guptill and Tom Latham and the emergence of Grant Elliott as a solid option at number five batsman. His role as a pinch hitter saw the team reach their first-ever World Cup final. After the World Cup, he returned to his preferred spot at number five for tests. He still occasionally keeps wickets for domestic T20s until 2015.

== International recognition ==
In the 2015 Queen's Birthday Honours McCullum was appointed an Officer of the New Zealand Order of Merit for services to cricket. He won the New Zealand Sportsman Of The Year award in 2014, and then the Sport New Zealand Leadership Award in 2016.

In June 2016, just a few months after his retirement from international cricket, McCullum was honoured with an invitation to deliver the prestigious MCC Spirit of Cricket Cowdrey Lecture. He became only the second New Zealand player ever to have been invited to deliver the Cowdrey lecture, the only other New Zealander being the late Martin Crowe.

== Coaching career ==
McCullum was appointed as head coach for both Trinbago Knight Riders and Kolkata Knight Riders in August 2019. Under his stewardship, Trinbago won their fourth Caribbean Premier League title in 2020, while Kolkata reached the Indian Premier League final in 2021.

=== England ===
On 12 May 2022, he was appointed as a head coach of Test format for the England cricket team. His first assignment was a 3-Test home series against his home country New Zealand, which got off to a great start as England won the game at Lord's by 5 wickets. He then continued to coach the team to a second 5 wicket win on the batting-friendly Trent Bridge. Joe Root's 176 in the first innings was characterised by McCullum's coaching, as well as the bowling in the second innings, with McCullum advising positions to Ben Stokes, England's captain. The series clean sweep was completed with a victory by 7 wickets in the Third Test at Headingley.

This was followed by a win against India at Edgbaston, where England chased down a record 378 for the loss of only three wickets. The new attacking, positive intention approach, instigated by McCullum and captain Ben Stokes was labelled Bazball by Andrew Miller, the UK editor of Cricinfo, after McCullum's Baz nickname. The phrase picked up increasing use across the wider media.

The South Africa cricket team toured England to play three Test matches in August 2022. England won the series win 2–1.

In the winter of 2022 during England's tour of Pakistan, he coached England to the first ever whitewash of Pakistan in a home series.

In September 2024, it was announced that in addition to his duties with the Test team, McCullum would take over as coach of the England limited-overs teams in January 2025. His contract, which had been due to expire in early 2026, was also extended until the end of the following year, after the World Cup.

In the summer of 2025, India toured England to play a five match Test series for the Anderson-Tendulkar Trophy. The series was drawn 2–2.

The 2025-26 Ashes series saw England lose all of the first three test matches and consequently the series. McCullum admitted after the third test that England's light preparation for the series may have been inadequate. In the Boxing Day Test, England registered their first Test win in Australia in nearly 15 years. England went on to lose the series 4–1.

Following the Ashes series, the ECB announced that they would be conducting a review of the Ashes series, covering the preparation and planning of the tour, as well as the performances and behaviours of McCullum and the players. Following the review, the ECB opted to retain McCullum in his role as Test head coach.

In February and March 2026, McCullum led England in the 2026 T20 World Cup. England reached the semi-finals and were knocked out by eventual champions India.

In June 2026, New Zealand toured England in a three match Test series. New Zealand won the series 2–1. During the third Test, Ben Stokes announced his retirement from international cricket.

On 12 July 2026, McCullum was sacked as head coach of the England Test team, but remained as head coach of England's white ball teams.

== Controversies ==
During the first Test match in Zimbabwe in 2005, McCullum controversially ran out tailender Chris Mpofu in Zimbabwe's second innings with Mpofu leaving his batting crease to congratulate Blessing Mahwire who had just reached his half-century.

During the first test between New Zealand and Sri Lanka at Christchurch in 2006, McCullum was once again involved in a controversial run out, this time dismissing Muttiah Muralitharan who, after completing a run, left his crease to congratulate Kumar Sangakkara who had just reached his century. McCullum was hesitant to respond to criticism and defended his actions, but in 2016 apologised for the incident when he delivered the MCC Spirit of Cricket lecture. He was reported as saying "If I could turn back time, I would. We were within the laws of the game but not the spirit and there is a very important difference which is glaringly obvious to me years later."

During the 2009 ICC Champions Trophy, he was again involved in a controversial run out, this time dismissing England's Paul Collingwood after he had left the batting crease at the conclusion of an over. Collingwood had faced a short ball and McCullum collected the ball and threw the ball to remove the bails. The match referee for the match Roshan Mahanama confirmed that the ball had hit the stumps before umpire Daryl Harper called "over", but New Zealand's captain, Daniel Vettori, withdrew the appeal and Collingwood was recalled to continue his innings. In July 2023, during the second Ashes Test at Lord's, McCullum, who was England's head coach, was critical of Australia's wicket-keeper Alex Carey for running out Jonny Bairstow in similar circumstances.

== Beyond cricket ==
McCullum has since been involved in setting up CricHQ with the company's CEO Simon Baker and former New Zealand cricketer Stephen Fleming. The cricket competition management software and live scoring platform manages the administration of cricket test countries New Zealand, Sri Lanka, South Africa and Zimbabwe with 49 of 105 national governing bodies also use its services from club level upwards. 20 other high-profile cricketing names have invested in the company. In June 2015 it raised US$10m from Singapore private equity firm Tembusu Partners to expand globally.

In May 2018, he briefly returned to rugby for a month, a game he hasn't played since starting over Dan Carter in high school before retiring, citing diminishing knowledge of the game, and rugby fitness.

McCullum became the brand ambassador for a gambling website in 2023. The Problem Gambling Foundation made a formal complaint about a YouTube advertisement he appeared in promoting the website, saying it would be illegal if it was shown on a New Zealand content provider.

== See also ==
- List of Test cricket triple centuries

Sporting positions
Preceded by Ross Taylor	New Zealand Test captains 2012/13–2015/16	Succeeded by Kane Williamson
Preceded by Daniel Vettori	New Zealand One-Day captains 2008/09–2015/16	Succeeded by Kane Williamson
Preceded by Ross Taylor	New Zealand T20I captains 2012/13–2015	Succeeded by Kane Williamson
Preceded by Sourav Ganguly	Kolkata Knight Riders Captain; 2009	Succeeded by Gautam Gambhir
Awards
Preceded by Scott Dixon	New Zealand's Sportsman of the Year; 2014	Succeeded by Kane Williamson
Preceded by Barbara Kendall	Halberg Awards – Leadership Award; 2015	Succeeded by Sophie Pascoe
