= Household name =

Household name may refer to:

- Household Name (album), a studio album by Momma
- A well-known brand, see brand awareness
- A well-known person, see celebrity

== See also ==
- House name (disambiguation)
- Household Names, American rock band in Austin, Texas
