= Stephan Marillier =

Zimbabwean cricketer (born 1984)

Personal information
- Full name: Stephan James Marillier
- Born: 25 September 1984 (age 42); Harare, Zimbabwe
- Batting: Right-handed
- Bowling: Right-arm off-break
- Role: Batsman
- Relatives: Anthony Marillier (father); Eian Marillier (brother); Dougie Marillier (brother)

Domestic team information
- Years: Team
- 2009/10–2010/11: Southern Rocks
- 2011/12: Mid West Rhinos
- 2018: Norfolk
- FC debut: 30 September 2009 Southern Rocks v Mashonaland Eagles
- Last FC: 13 February 2012 Mid West Rhinos v Matabeleland Tuskers
- LA debut: 5 October 2009 Southern Rocks v Mashonaland Eagles
- Last LA: 25 February 2012 Mid West Rhinos v Mashonaland Eagles

Career statistics
Competition	First-class	List A
Matches	26	17
Runs scored	1,330	357
Batting average	29.55	21.00
100s/50s	1/7	0/4
Top score	148*	57
Catches/stumpings	11/–	4/–
- Source: Cricinfo, 22 February 2017

Stephan James Marillier (born 25 September 1984) is a Zimbabwean professional cricketer who holds a UK passport and currently plays in Norfolk. After playing Second XI cricket for Derbyshire County Cricket Club in 2009, he made his first-class cricket debut for Southern Rocks in the 2009–10 Logan Cup in September 2009, going on to play in 26 first-class and 17 List A matches in Zimbabwe between then and February 2012.

After representing his country at under-15 level, Marillier played for a Zimbabwe XI in the 2009–10 ICC Intercontinental Cup against Ireland and for the Zimbabwe A side in three matches against New Zealand A on their tour of Zimbabwe in October 2010.

In 2013 Marillier moved to England, playing for Horsford Cricket Club in Norfolk in the East Anglian Premier Cricket League. He qualified to play for Norfolk and made his debut for Norfolk County Cricket Club in the MCCA T20 competition in May 2018.

Marillier's father, Anthony Marillier, played one first-class match for Rhodesia in 1975. His older brothers Eian and Dougie both played first-class cricket in Zimbabwe. Eian played for Zimbabwe under-19s whilst Dougie played for Zimbabwe in five Test matches and 48 One Day Internationals.
