= Dougie Marillier =

Zimbabwean cricketer (born 1978)

Personal information
- Full name: Douglas Anthony Marillier
- Born: 24 April 1978 (age 48); Salisbury, Rhodesia
- Batting: Right-handed
- Bowling: Right-arm offbreak
- Role: Wicket-keeper
- Relatives: Anthony Marillier (father); Eian Marillier (brother); Stephan Marillier (brother)

International information
- National side: Zimbabwe (2000–2003)
- Test debut (cap 47): 26 December 2000 v New Zealand
- Last Test: 12 January 2002 v Sri Lanka
- ODI debut (cap 60): 30 September 2000 v New Zealand
- Last ODI: 5 July 2003 v South Africa
- ODI shirt no.: 42

Domestic team information
- Years: Team
- 1999/2000–2004/05: Midlands
- 2009/10: Mashonaland Eagles

Career statistics
| Competition | Test | ODI |
|---|---|---|
| Matches | 5 | 48 |
| Runs scored | 186 | 672 |
| Batting average | 31.00 | 18.16 |
| 100s/50s | 0/2 | 1/3 |
| Top score | 73 | 100 |
| Balls bowled | 616 | 1,574 |
| Wickets | 11 | 30 |
| Bowling average | 29.28 | 41.16 |
| 5 wickets in innings | 0 | 0 |
| 10 wickets in match | 0 | 0 |
| Best bowling | 4/57 | 4/38 |
| Catches/stumpings | 2/– | 12/– |
- Source: Cricinfo, 11 August 2017

Douglas Anthony Marillier (born 24 June 1978), known as Dougie Marillier, is a former Zimbabwean cricketer, who played Test and One Day International cricket for the national side.

He is a right-handed batsman known for his unorthodox technique and a right-arm offspin bowler. He is credited as being the inventor of the Marillier shot, in which the batsman extends the bat as a ramp in front of him and flicks the ball over his shoulder to fine leg. He was well known for his cameo knocks in ODIs against Australia in 2001 and against India in 2002 playing the famous Marillier scoops in both of those matches. He also received the nickname "Bay City Roller" by his Zimbabwean teammates for his knocks in Perth and Faridabad.

He has a one-day top score of 100, achieved in Sharjah against Kenya in April 2003 as an opener. He was one of the very few batsmen to have batted as an opener as well as batting at number 10 in ODI cricket.

== Family ==
He currently runs Marillier Properties, a real estate company in Zimbabwe which is also regarded as his family business. His son Codie Marillier also played cricket and made his first Indian tour to play few unofficial matches in 2019 and was guided by former Zimbabwean veteran seamer Heath Streak.

== Early life ==
Marillier was born in Salisbury (present-day Harare). His father was a policeman and played cricket for the Harare Police Club and the provincial team. Marillier first played cricket at North Park Primary School, and in his third year he started to play in the Colts side, with boys three years older than he was. His elder brother, Eian, played as a wicket-keeper in a few first-class matches in Zimbabwe and in the UK. Their younger brother, Stephan James Marillier, played for Southern Rocks in Zimbabwean franchise cricket.

Marillier attended Eaglesvale High School in Harare and quickly became a key figure for the cricket team there. When he was 16, Marillier played for Mashonaland U19s for the first time. He used a wheelchair for three months (some sources say he used a wheelchair for about one year) after breaking both legs in a car accident and his prospects of playing cricket again seemed grim. The doctors even doubted that he would ever walk in the future. After recovering, he returned to playing cricket.

== Domestic career ==
Marillier applied for and was accepted by the CFX Academy in 1999 and the following year he was accepted into the Australian Cricket Academy. When he returned Marillier hit a hundred for the Academy against the New Zealanders in a one-day warm-up game, and this led to his selection for the full national side for the ODI series.

Domestically in Zimbabwe, he did well in the Logan Cup, captaining the Midlands team and scoring two centuries to average 55. However, this was down the order, as he decided his technique was not tight enough for him to open the innings. He was the leading run scorer for the Midlands team in the 1999–2000 Logan Cup with 410 runs, in the 2000–2001 Logan Cup and in the 2004–2005 Logan Cup with 412 runs in each seasons.

Despite his domestic success, he failed to keep his place against Bangladesh, and decided to take up a club appointment in England rather than stay at home and hope for selection against India and West Indies. He might have had a match or two, in fact, as Zimbabwe suffered from injuries, and had he been available he might have played in the final Test against the West Indies instead of Hamilton Masakadza, who hit a century on debut.

Marillier's last domestic commitment was for Zimbabwe A against Pakistan A in 2005. After that he did not play any official cricket. He is currently working in the Real Estate in Zimbabwe and also play some social cricket there. In 2009, he turned out for 'Red Lions' in the Zimbabwean Winter Premier Cricket League and it was believed that he was a player to return through franchise system. But after the introduction of franchise cricket in Zimbabwe, that does not seem to be the case for him along with another former Zimbabwean player Campbell MacMillan.

== U-19 and Zimbabwe A career ==
Marillier toured England with the Zimbabwe U-19 team in 1996 and set a then world record partnership of 268 for the first wicket with his friend Mark Vermeulen When Marillier got back from that tour he started playing league cricket, and his good form there led to his selection for Zimbabwe B. He did not play for a while but when he did he played very well, hitting 108 against Border B. In 1998 he played for Kenilworth in England as an overseas player, hitting 1207 runs in 98, followed by 1218 in 1999. To date, he is the only overseas honorary life member of Kenilworth Cricket Club as he was bestowed the prestigious membership in 2001.

== International career ==
Marillier made his ODI debut in place of Craig Wishart in the second match of the series against New Zealand in Bulawayo on 30 September 2000 where he opened the batting. The first ball he faced was on his legs and so he flicked it away for three, which settled him. He put on 83 for the first wicket with Alistair Campbell before pulling a long hop to midwicket for 27. Their stand was a major reason why Zimbabwe won the match eventually by 21 runs. In the third match of the series against New Zealand he scored 47, in a partnership of 97 with Campbell. His international debut came at the age of 20, just four years after the horrific accident.

In 2000, Zimbabwe travelled to Nairobi for the 2000 ICC KnockOut Trophy, but unfortunately the team had already been selected, so Marillier was unable to go. He was naturally a member of the following overseas trip, the extended tour of Sharjah, India, New Zealand and Australia. Opening the batting in five One Day Internationals, his highest score was only 11, but the tour selectors persevered with him, putting him down to number seven, where he scored 38 against India. He also made his Test debut against New Zealand on 26 December 2000 scoring 28.

His lack of consistency meant that he did not play in the triangular tournament in Australia, which also included West Indies, until the final match. He could hardly have had a more testing experience, as a fine Zimbabwe batting performance after Australia scored over 300 meant that he came in at number seven needing to score 15 in the final over, bowled by Glenn McGrath, to win the match. He moved across to the first and third balls he received from McGrath which were low full tosses and flicked them over his shoulder to fine leg for boundaries, reviving hopes of an incredible Zimbabwe victory. But he was just unable to complete the job, and his team lost by one run. It was also remarkably the first time that Marillier had faced McGrath in his career. His two courageous and unorthodox boundary strokes did win him respect, with the shot becoming known as the Marillier shot. It also became his trademark shot as the shot was named after him as a tribute.

He won back his place in the one-day side against England, but failed again with the bat; it was surprisingly his bowling that kept him in the team, after he took four wickets for 38 against England at Bulawayo in 2001 and continued thereafter to bowl his flighted off-breaks usefully. He most importantly broke the solid opening partnership between Marcus Trescothick and Nick Knight of 95 in match Zimbabwe went onto lose by 70 runs. After scoring 19 runs in five innings, two of them opening, he broke through with 52 not out at number six against Sri Lanka in Sharjah, followed by 37 in Pakistan.

Marillier continued to do reasonably well for the national side. In 2002 he "Marilliered" Zimbabwe to a famous win in India by one wicket in an ODI with a 56* at the death, although this time he used the shot against Anil Kumble. In the same match, he broke the record for the fastest fifty by a Zimbabwean, reaching that landmark in just 21 deliveries. He arrived to the crease at no 10 position with Zimbabwe was reeling at 233/8 with still needing to chase 42 runs to win off 5.2 overs and with only two wickets left. He also attacked, ramped and scooped Zaheer Khan in that match where Zaheer was looking threatening for Zimbabwe as he picked up 4 wickets in the match. He ended up hitting 10 fours and a six to pull off an unexpected victory over the Indians as Zimbabwe chased 275. His ramp shots also stunned the cricketing world which also made both Pommie Mbangwa and Sanjay Manjrekar stunned who were the commentators during the match with Manjrekar remarked that he had never seen a batsman before playing a sweep on the offside. He also became a household name in 2000s for innovating Marillier Scoop. He also credited his fellow batting partner Gary Brent who batted at number 11 who took the most important single in the last over of the match.

Marillier also set the record for becoming the first ever batsman to score half century when batting at number 10 position, when he did it in 2002 against India. It was remained has the highest ODI score by a number 10 batsman in ODI history for about 7 years, later it was surpassed by Mohammad Amir. Marillier's 56* remains the third highest score at number 10 position by any batsman and the highest for Zimbabwe at no 10 in ODIs.

He made the side for the 2003 Cricket World Cup but did not do well. After the World Cup however he had an excellent tournament in Sharjah, taking wickets as well as scoring 100 against Kenya, his first international hundred, as an opener.

In England however Marillier had a bad form slump and lost his place, although his tight bowling in tandem with Ray Price was a key factor in Zimbabwe's only ODI win, over England at Bristol which came in 2003. He did not play for the national side again, with first Wishart then Barney Rogers preferred to him as opener. Just before the rebellion Marillier announced his retirement from cricket. However he returned in action in domestic cricket and played for sometime.

Marillier's international stats do not do him justice really; he averages 31 in Tests with two fifties, although it has to be said both came against Bangladesh, and in ODIs his batting average is only 18 (but he can be a match winner on his day) and 41 with the ball, with 30 wickets. In first-class cricket Marillier averages 37 with 6 hundreds and 13 fifties. With the ball he averages 37 with 46 wickets. His international career was hit with political turmoil within Zimbabwe cricket which began in 2001 and his opportunities to play at international level started to diminish. He retired from international cricket in 2004 at the age of 25 and went to England to become a professional player there. He soon returned to Zimbabwe in 2010 and signed with Mashonaland Eagles However, he was surprisingly included in a 30 man provisional squad along with Andy Blignaut for the tour of West Indies to play a 5 match ODI series in 2010.
