= Stuart McCullum =

New Zealand cricketer

Personal information
- Full name: Stuart James McCullum
- Born: 6 December 1956 (age 69); Eltham, Taranaki, New Zealand
- Batting: Left-handed
- Role: Occasional wicket-keeper
- Relatives: Brendon McCullum (son); Nathan McCullum (son)

Domestic team information
- Years: Team
- 1976/77–1990/91: Otago

Career statistics
Competition	First-class	List A
Matches	75	41
Runs scored	3,174	798
Batting average	24.41	20.46
100s/50s	2/16	0/3
Top score	134	97*
Balls bowled	86	9
Wickets	1	1
Bowling average	46.00	8.00
5 wickets in innings	0	0
10 wickets in match	0	0
Best bowling	1/0	1/2
Catches/stumpings	69/2	16/0
- Source: CricketArchive, 6 February 2011

Stuart James McCullum (born 6 December 1956) is a New Zealand former cricketer who played for Otago between the 1976–77 season and 1990–91. A left-handed opening batsman who occasionally kept-wicket, he is the father of former New Zealand international cricketers Brendon and Nathan McCullum.

McCullum was born at Eltham in Taranaki in 1956. He was educated at King's High School in Dunedin and played club cricket for Albion Cricket Club in a working-class area in the south of the city. He first played age-group cricket for Otago during the 1974–75 season and made his representative debut for the provincial team in December 1976. Opening the batting for Otago against Canterbury at Christchurch, a half-century on debut saw McCullum retained in the Otago team for much the season, scoring 273 runs in eight matches.

After making his List A debut later in the 1976–77 season, McCullum went on to play for Otago in every season until the end of 1990–91. He featured in 75 first-class matches, scoring 3,174 runs and making two centuries, and in 41 List A matches, scoring 798 runs with a highest score of 97 not out made against the touring England international team in January 1984. After returning he became a selector for the Otago representative team.
