= New Zealand Cricket Hall of Fame =

- Sport: Cricket
- Awarded for: Achievements of the New Zealand cricketers

History
- First award: 2024

The New Zealand Cricket Hall of Fame is a hall of fame that recognises the achievements of cricketers who have played for the New Zealand men's national cricket team or New Zealand women's national cricket team. It was established in 2024 by New Zealand Cricket, the New Zealand Cricket Players Association and the New Zealand Cricket Museum.

== Inductees ==
- Bert Sutcliffe
- John Reid
- Jackie Lord
- Trish McKelvey
- Glenn Turner
- Sir Richard Hadlee
- Debbie Hockley
- Martin Crowe
- Emily Drumm
- Daniel Vettori
- Brendon McCullum
- Jeremy Coney
- Haidee Tiffen
