= Zimbabwean cricket team in England in 2003 =

Cricket Tour

	Zimbabwe	England
- Dates: 3 May – 10 July 2003
Captains	Heath Streak	Nasser Hussain (Tests); Michael Vaughan (ODIs)

Test series
- Result: England won the 2-match series 2–0
Most runs	Dion Ebrahim (135)	Mark Butcher (184)
Most wickets	Heath Streak (7)	James Anderson (11)
- Player of the series: Mark Butcher (Eng) and Heath Streak (Zim)

The Zimbabwe cricket team toured England in the 2003 season to play a two-match Test series against England. England won the series 2–0 with no matches drawn. England's James Anderson made his Test debut in the first match of the series, taking a five-wicket haul. The two teams were also involved in a triangular One Day International tournament with South Africa.

== Tour matches ==
=== First-class: British Universities v Zimbabweans ===
3–5 May 2003
Scorecard

British Universities	v	Zimbabweans
146 (63.1 overs); Jimmy Adams 42 (80); Douglas Hondo 5/26 (13 overs)		376 (98 overs); Grant Flower 130 (207); Justin Bishop 3/70 (14 overs)
263 (73.4 overs); Ed Cowan 137* (148); Andy Blignaut 4/89 (21.4 overs)		37/0 (3.4 overs); Mark Vermeulen 28* (12)

Zimbabwe won by 10 wickets
Edgbaston, Birmingham
Umpires: Roy Palmer (Eng) and Ken Shuttleworth (Eng)

- British Universities won the toss and elected to bat.

=== First-class: Worcestershire v Zimbabweans ===
9–12 May 2012
Scorecard

Worcestershire	v	Zimbabweans
262 (60.5 overs); Vikram Solanki 74 (79); Douglas Hondo 3/53 (13 overs)		334 (126.2 overs); Stuart Carlisle 157 (374); Kabir Ali 3/89 (28 overs)
247 (79.4 overs); Andrew Hall 68 (106); Grant Flower 3/25 (11 overs)		175 (62 overs); Andy Blignaut 42 (42); Kabir Ali 5/48 (15 overs)

Match tied
New Road, Worcester
Umpires: Nigel Cowley (Eng) and Richard Kettleborough (Eng)

- Worcestershire won the toss and elected to bat.

=== First-class: Sussex v Zimbabweans ===
15–18 May 2003
Scorecard

Zimbabweans	v	Sussex
395 (122.5 overs); Mark Vermeulen 198 (304); Paul Hutchison 4/94 (22.5 overs)		179/4 (48.1 overs); Bas Zuiderent 50 (92); Andy Blignaut 1/24 (10 overs)

Match drawn
County Ground, Hove
Umpires: Pasty Harris (Eng) and Peter Willey (Eng)

- Zimbabweans won the toss and elected to bat.
- No play was possible on Day 2 and play on Day 3 was reduced to 22 overs.
- Andrew Hodd (Sssx) made his first-class debut.

=== First-class: Middlesex v Zimbabweans ===
30 May–2 June 2003
Scorecard

Middlesex	v	Zimbabweans
516/6d (138.5 overs); Robin Weston 129 (208); Travis Friend 2/121 (28 overs)		401/4d (108 overs); Stuart Carlisle 137 (223); Chris Peploe 1/61 (14 overs)
222/2d (38 overs); Owais Shah 101* (80); Ray Price 1/31 (7 overs)		221/5 (65 overs); Dion Ebrahim 64 (131); Thos Hunt 2/28 (7 overs)

Match drawn
Denis Compton Oval, Shenley
Umpires: Michael Dixon (Eng) and John Hampshire (Eng)

- Middlesex won the toss and elected to bat.
- Chris Peploe (Middx) made his first-class debut.

=== 50-over: Somerset v Zimbabweans ===
17 June 2003
Scorecard

Zimbabweans; 285/9 (50 overs)	v	Somerset; 282/7 (50 overs)
Stuart Carlisle 119 (129); Steffan Jones 2/40 (10 overs)		Keith Dutch 93 (82); Dougie Marillier 1/31 (4 overs)

Zimbabweans won by 3 runs
County Ground, Taunton
Umpires: Rob Bailey (Eng) and Trevor Jesty (Eng)

- Zimbabweans won the toss and elected to bat.

=== 50-over: Hampshire v Zimbabweans ===
19 June 2003
Scorecard

Hampshire; 262/5 (50 overs)	v	Zimbabweans; 246 (49.1 overs)
Derek Kenway 120* (143); Dougie Marillier 1/23 (5 overs)		Dougie Marillier 54 (73); Ed Giddins 4/33 (9.1 overs)

Hampshire won by 16 runs
Rose Bowl, Southampton
Umpires: Neil Bainton (Eng) and Mervyn Kitchen (Eng)

- Zimbabweans won the toss and elected to field.

=== 50-over: Essex v Zimbabweans ===
22 June 2003
Scorecard

Essex; 189/9 (50 overs)	v	Zimbabweans; 193/5 (39 overs)
Andy Flower 52 (56); Ray Price 3/20 (10 overs)		Grant Flower 60* (79); Joe Grant 2/36 (7 overs)

Zimbabweans won by 5 wickets
County Ground, Chelmsford
Umpires: Pasty Harris (Eng) and Tim Robinson (Eng)

- Zimbabweans won the toss and elected to field.

== Test series ==
=== 1st Test ===
22–24 May 2003
Scorecard

England	v	Zimbabwe
472 (133.1 overs); Mark Butcher 137 (256); Andy Blignaut 3/96 (26.1 overs)		147 (55 overs); Dion Ebrahim 68 (127); James Anderson 5/73 (16 overs)
		233 (f/o) (68.5 overs); Mark Vermeulen 61 (81); Mark Butcher 4/60 (12.5 overs)

England won by an innings and 92 runs
Lord's, London
Umpires: Steve Bucknor (WI) and Dave Orchard (SA)
Player of the match: Mark Butcher (Eng)

- Zimbabwe won the toss and elected to field.
- James Anderson, Anthony McGrath (both Eng) and Sean Ervine (Zim) made their Test debuts.

=== 2nd Test ===
5–7 June 2003
Scorecard

England	v	Zimbabwe
416 (127.1 overs); Anthony McGrath 81 (183); Heath Streak 4/64 (34.1 overs)		94 (32.1 overs); Tatenda Taibu 31 (67); Richard Johnson 6/33 (12 overs)
		253 (f/o) (93.4 overs); Travis Friend 65* (107); Steve Harmison 4/55 (21.4 overs)

England won by an innings and 69 runs
Riverside Ground, Chester-le-Street
Umpires: Darrell Hair (Aus) and Dave Orchard (SA)
Player of the match: Richard Johnson (Eng)

- England won the toss and elected to bat.
- Richard Johnson (Eng) made his Test debut.

== NatWest Series ==
=== 1st match: England v Zimbabwe ===
26 June 2003
Scorecard

England; 191/8 (50 overs)	v	Zimbabwe; 195/6 (48 overs)
Andrew Flintoff 53 (89); Heath Streak 2/30 (9 overs)		Grant Flower 96* (152); Richard Johnson 3/32 (10 overs)

Zimbabwe won by 4 wickets
Trent Bridge, Nottingham
Umpires: Simon Taufel (Aus) and Peter Willey (Eng)
Player of the match: Grant Flower (Zim)

- Zimbabwe won the toss and elected to field.
- Richard Johnson and Rob Key (both Eng) made their ODI debuts.

=== 3rd match: South Africa v Zimbabwe ===
29 June 2003
Scorecard

South Africa; 272/5 (50 overs)	v	Zimbabwe; 226/9 (50 overs)
Jacques Kallis 125* (147); Douglas Hondo 2/29 (9.1 overs)		Travis Friend 82 (93); Andrew Hall 3/38 (9 overs)

South Africa won by 46 runs
St Lawrence Ground, Canterbury
Umpires: Billy Bowden (NZ) and Neil Mallender (Eng)
Player of the match: Jacques Kallis (SA)

- Zimbabwe won the toss and elected to field.

=== 4th match: England v Zimbabwe ===
1 July 2003
Scorecard

England; 81/4 (16.3 overs)	v	Zimbabwe
Michael Vaughan 35* (45); Heath Streak 2/13 (4 overs)

No result
Headingley, Leeds
Umpires: David Shepherd (Eng) and Simon Taufel (Aus)

- Zimbabwe won the toss and elected to field.
- Match reduced to 25 overs per side.
- Kabir Ali (Eng) made his ODI debut.

=== 6th match: South Africa v Zimbabwe ===
5 July 2003
Scorecard

Zimbabwe; 174/8 (50 overs)	v	South Africa; 175/1 (34.2 overs)
Heath Streak 54 (72); Jacques Kallis 3/47 (10 overs)		Herschelle Gibbs 93* (97); Sean Ervine 1/13 (2.2 overs)

South Africa won by 9 wickets
Sophia Gardens, Cardiff
Umpires: Simon Taufel (Aus) and Peter Willey (Eng)
Player of the match: Herschelle Gibbs (SA)

- South Africa won the toss and elected to field.

=== 7th match: England v Zimbabwe ===
6 July 2003
Scorecard

Zimbabwe; 92 (24.5 overs)	v	England; 95/4 (17.5 overs)
Stuart Matsikenyeri 26 (35); Darren Gough 4/26 (9 overs)		Andrew Flintoff 47* (37); Heath Streak 4/21 (9 overs)

England won by 6 wickets
County Ground, Bristol
Umpires: Billy Bowden (NZ) and Neil Mallender (Eng)
Player of the match: Andrew Flintoff (Eng)

- England won the toss and elected to field.
- Charles Coventry (Zim) made his ODI debut.

=== 9th match: South Africa v Zimbabwe ===
10 July 2003
Scorecard

Zimbabwe; 173/8 (50 overs)	v	South Africa; 174/3 (35.2 overs)
Heath Streak 50* (90); Makhaya Ntini 4/45 (10 overs)		Graeme Smith 69 (80); Douglas Hondo 2/25 (7 overs)

South Africa won by 7 wickets
Rose Bowl, Southampton
Umpires: Billy Bowden (NZ) and David Shepherd (Eng)
Player of the match: Makhaya Ntini (SA)

- Zimbabwe won the toss and elected to bat.

== Sources ==
- Playfair Cricket Annual 2004
- Wisden Cricketers' Almanack 2004
