= Nathan McCullum =

New Zealand cricketer

Personal information
- Full name: Nathan Leslie McCullum
- Born: 1 September 1980 (age 46); Dunedin, Otago, New Zealand
- Batting: Right-handed
- Bowling: Right-arm off break
- Role: Bowling all-rounder
- Relatives: Brendon McCullum (brother); Stuart McCullum (father)

International information
- National side: New Zealand (2007–2016)
- ODI debut (cap 156): 8 September 2009 v Sri Lanka
- Last ODI: 19 August 2015 v South Africa
- ODI shirt no.: 15
- T20I debut (cap 26): 19 September 2007 v South Africa
- Last T20I: 26 March 2016 v Bangladesh
- T20I shirt no.: 15

Domestic team information
- Years: Team
- 1999/00–2015/16: Otago (squad no. 8)
- 2010: Lancashire
- 2011: Pune Warriors India
- 2011/12–2012/13: Sydney Sixers (squad no. 15)
- 2013: Glamorgan (squad no. 9)
- 2015: St Lucia Zouks
- 2015/16: Quetta Galdiators

Career statistics
Competition	ODI	T20I	FC	LA
Matches	84	63	65	203
Runs scored	1,070	299	2,329	3,077
Batting average	20.98	11.50	25.04	23.31
100s/50s	0/4	0/0	1/14	1/16
Top score	65	36*	106*	119
Balls bowled	3,536	1,123	11,508	9,079
Wickets	63	58	139	169
Bowling average	46.92	22.03	40.05	41.41
5 wickets in innings	0	0	3	1
10 wickets in match	0	0	0	0
Best bowling	3/24	4/16	6/90	5/39
Catches/stumpings	41/–	26/–	71/–	97/–
Medal record
Men's Cricket
Representing New Zealand
ICC Cricket World Cup
Runner-up	2015 Australia and New Zealand
- Source: ESPNcricinfo, 24 March 2024

Nathan Leslie McCullum (born 1 September 1980) is a New Zealand former international cricketer who represented the national team in One Day International and Twenty20 International cricket. A right-arm off-break bowler, he played domestically for Otago between the 1999–2000 and 2015–16 seasons. He was also a part of the New Zealand squad to finish as runners-up at the 2015 Cricket World Cup.

He retired from international cricket after the 2016 ICC World Twenty20.

== Personal life ==
McCullum is the son of former Otago cricketer Stuart McCullum and the older brother of Otago and New Zealand captain Brendon McCullum. Both brothers attended King's High School in Dunedin.

McCullum is married; he is the father of three boys and since retiring from cricket has moved to Auckland to work as a construction recruitment agent, specialising in the field of industrial and commercial construction, including land building maintenance and office refurbishment. He became the general manager of Total Property Worx, an Auckland-based construction firm.

== Domestic career ==
McCullum made his first-class debut for Otago in the 1999–2000 season. His first List A match came in the 2000–01 season, and his first Twenty20 domestic match was against Canterbury at Christchurch on 13 January 2006. Later that year, McCullum was selected as part of the 30-man preliminary squad for the 2006 ICC Champions Trophy alongside fellow Otago teammates Warren McSkimming and Bradley Scott, but ultimately missed out on the final squad. In 2007, he toured the Netherlands and served as a player-coach for Hermes Cricket Club, taking charge of the age group and main team.

McCullum played in a number of overseas Twenty20 tournaments from 2010 for teams including Lancashire, Pune Warriors India, Sunrisers Hyderabad, Sydney Sixers, and Glamorgan. In 2010, he replaced Shoaib Malik as Lancashire's overseas player for the T20 Blast and was selected by Sydney Sixers for the 2011–12 Big Bash League season. He was part of the Sydney team which won the 2012 Champions League Twenty20, taking three wickets in the final against Highveld Lions.

== International career ==
He made his Twenty20 International debut for New Zealand against South Africa on 19 September 2007 at the inaugural edition of the Twenty20 World Cup in South Africa. However, he was dropped from the team after his T20I debut and worked harder with Mike Hesson in order to get back into the New Zealand team. He was also omitted from the 2009 ICC Champions Trophy.

He made his One Day International debut against Sri Lanka on 8 September 2009 at the age of 27 in Colombo. It marked his comeback return to the national team after a gap of two years. Although never playing test cricket, he has been a valuable asset in the shorter forms of the game, particularly in the 2011 Cricket World Cup in the sub-continent, where New Zealand ended up in semi finals. In February 2011, he was ruled out of New Zealand's opening match against Kenya after being hospitalised due to high fever. He played a key role in the quarterfinal match against South Africa Africa the 2011 World Cup where he took 3/24 in a low scoring match defending 221.

Although, Nathan was a regular feature in New Zealand's limited overs team since 2010s, his opportunities were often hampered at times due to the presence of Daniel Vettori who served as the lead spinner for New Zealand for a long time.

In an ODI against Sri Lanka at Hambantota in 2013, Nathan McCullum smashed 22 runs off spinner Rangana Herath's final over of the match when New Zealand required 21 in the last over. His match winning knock of unbeaten 32 off just nine deliveries including three sixes and one four in the penultimate over secured New Zealand a victory in a tense close rain curtailed match. He was also part of the New Zealand squad at the 2013 ICC Champions Trophy and in a group stage match against hosts England during the tournament, he set the record for taking the most number of catches in a Champions Trophy match with four. During the 2013 Champions Trophy, he also played a pivotal role in New Zealand's only win in the tournament scoring crucial 32 off 42 balls against Sri Lanka in a low scoring match where New Zealand won by one wicket chasing 139.

Although he was named in the final squad of 15 in 2015 Cricket World Cup, he was mostly used as a substitute fielder to Daniel Vettori. In 2015, McCullum announced he will retire from all forms of cricket at the end on the 2015/16 Southern Hemisphere summer season. He was not named in the Sri Lankan ODI series due to his back issues, so his ODI career is over, but he was named in the 2016 ICC World Twenty20. His last international match was against Bangladesh on 26 March 2016. He got out for first ball nought for Mustafizur Rahman as his fifth victim for T20I fifer. However, in bowling, McCullum took the wicket of Sabbir Rahman, which was his last international wicket as well. New Zealand finally won the match by 75 runs.

== Association football ==
Prior to concentrating on his cricketing career, McCullum played association football as a striker for Caversham AFC, winning the team's golden boot award in 1999 by scoring 19 goals in the FootballSouth Premier League. He scored two goals for the club in the 2003 New Zealand National Soccer League, at that time New Zealand's premier club league competition. He left the club in 2004, playing briefly with Mosgiel before turning his sporting attention completely to cricket. In 2017, he debuted for Auckland division 2 team, Ellerslie Diamonds, pulling his hamstring within minutes.

== Career best performances ==
	Batting				Bowling (innings)			
	Score	Fixture	Venue	Season	Figures	Fixture	Venue	Season
One Day International	65	New Zealand v Pakistan	Auckland	2011	3/24	New Zealand v South Africa	Mirpur	2011
Twenty20 International	36 not out	New Zealand v Sri Lanka	Lauderhill	2010	4/16	New Zealand v Pakistan	Hamilton	2010
First-class	106 not out	Otago v Northern Districts	Hamilton	2008	6/90	New Zealand A v India A	Chennai	2008
List A	119	Otago v Wellington	Queenstown	2014	5/39	Otago v Central Districts	Palmerston North	2011
Twenty 20	76 not out	Otago v Canterbury	Dunedin	2009	4/16	New Zealand v Pakistan	Hamilton	2010
