= House name =

House name may refer to:

- Hofname, a traditional name associated with a farmer and their house in Germany
- a type of collective pen name

== See also ==
- Household name (disambiguation)
