= Paddle scoop =

Modern cricketing shot

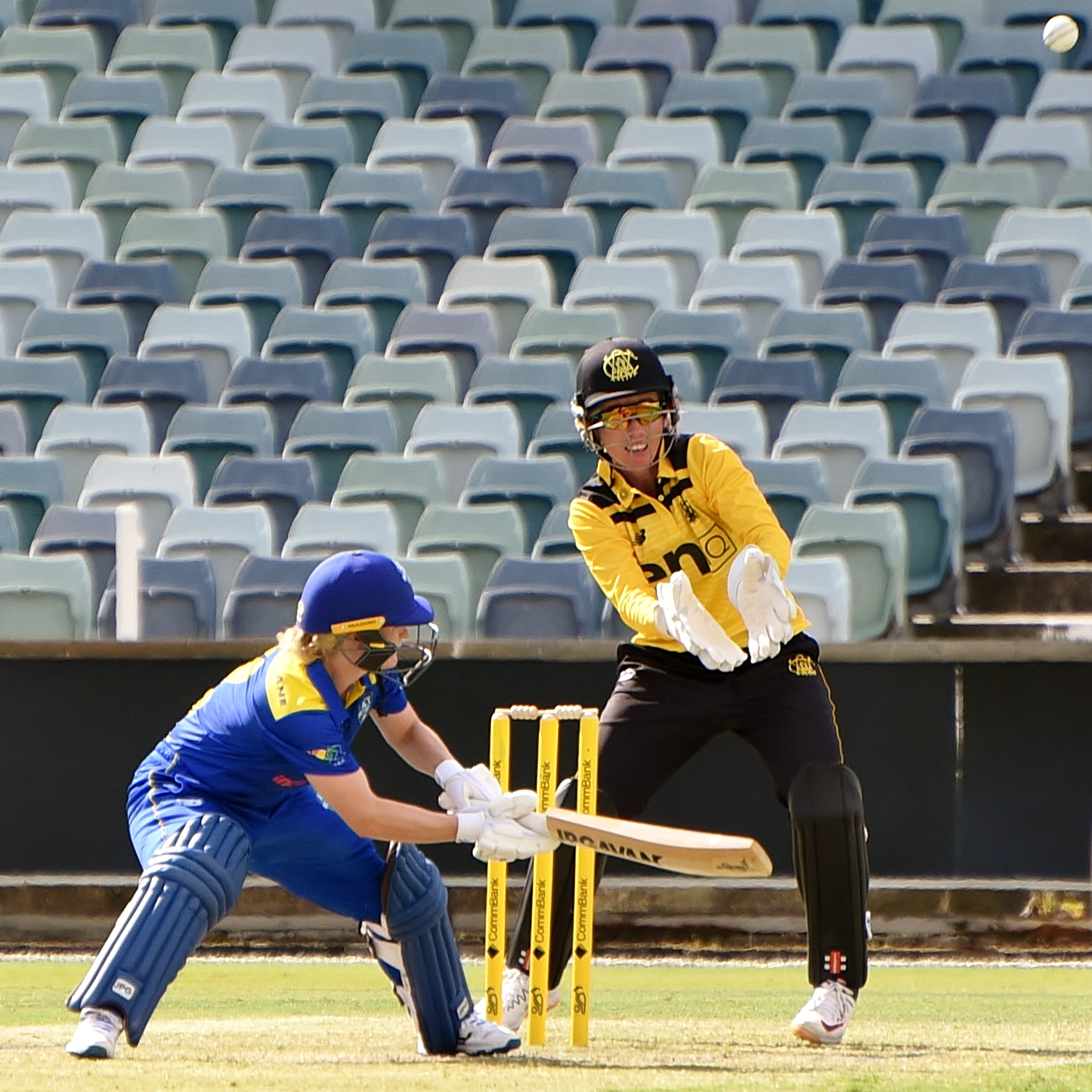
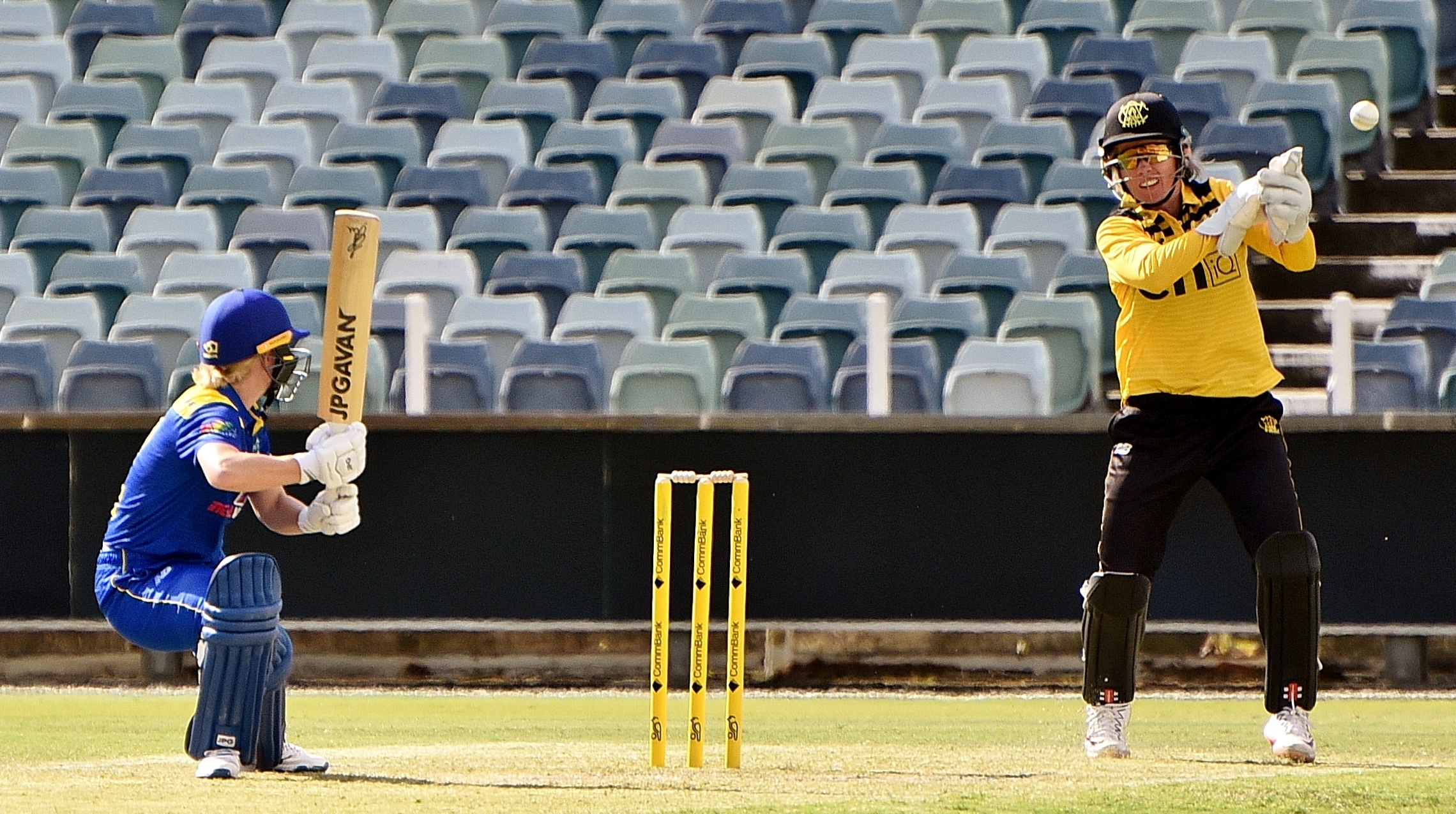
ACT Women captain Katie Mack plays two paddle scoop shots against WA Women during a WNCL match at the WACA Ground in Perth ... and narrowly avoids being caught by wicket-keeper Beth Mooney off the second shot

A paddle scoop, Marillier shot, lap shot, or ramp shot is a modern cricketing shot that reached prominence in the early 21st century, although its recorded origins trace back to the 19th century. Players have used it more and more often in One Day International and Twenty20 cricket matches. The player makes the shot by positioning the body square-on with the ball, both feet pointing towards the bowler. The player uses the bat to deflect the ball over the batter's leg side shoulder, thus guiding the ball towards the fine leg region.

The paddle-scoop is often useful because it can be used on a delivery that is usually considered a good "line and length" delivery, and otherwise difficult to score runs on. Also, the area where the shot sends the ball is often not patrolled by a fielder—and since the bowler's pace on the ball (faster than the pace imparted by a batsman's hit) sends it to the boundary, fielders may still find it difficult to cover more than a couple of yards on either side of themselves to stop the ball, because of its momentum.

This shot requires good hand-eye coordination, especially against fast bowlers. It's a premeditated shot that is occasionally used as a calculated risk. It is not practical for the bowling side to prepare for it, because positioning a fielder to stop a paddle scoop creates gaps and scoring opportunities in other areas.

== Shot history ==
In the nineteenth century, the indigenous Australian player Johnny Mullagh, who toured England in 1868, liked to play a shot that could be interpreted as a scoop shot or similar: "Dropping on one knee to a fast rising ball, he would hold his bat over his shoulder and parallel to the ground. The ball would touch the blade, and shoot high over the wicket-keeper's head to the boundary." The cricket journalist Scyld Berry credits the England and Hampshire batsman George Brown with playing the first recorded paddle scoop.

The shot was developed by Zimbabwean batsman Dougie Marillier. In a triangular tournament in 2001 in Australia with Zimbabwe, Australia and West Indies, Zimbabwe played their final match with Australia, and Marillier got a chance in the team. He could hardly have had a more testing experience, as a fine Zimbabwe batting performance after Australia scored 303 meant that he came in at number seven needing to score 15 to win the match in the final over, which was to be bowled by Glenn McGrath. Marillier moved across to the first and third balls he received from McGrath and flicked them over his shoulder to fine leg for boundaries, reviving hopes of an incredible Zimbabwe victory. But he was just unable to complete the job, and his team lost by two runs. His two courageous and unorthodox boundary strokes made him famous, with the shot becoming known as the Marillier shot.

Marillier continued to do reasonably well for the national side. In 2002, he "Marilliered" Zimbabwe to a famous win in India in a One Day International at Faridabad, finishing on 56 not out, and using the shot against Zaheer Khan.

== Joe Root variant ==
English batsman Joe Root is occasionally known for executing the reverse paddle scoop, a shot that stands in contrast to his typically orthodox style.

== Dilscoop variant ==
During 2009 ICC World Twenty20 tournament, Sri Lankan batsman Tillakaratne Dilshan mastered a similar shot to the paddle scoop. Dilshan's success with a similar shot led Dilshan's shot being titled the Dilscoop. The Dilscoop is different from the paddle scoop because Dilshan's scoop is played straight over the head of the wicketkeeper rather than to one side of the wicketkeeper.

The "Paddle scoop" shot was played much earlier, by then Somerset captain, Brian Langford, in an English county match at the Edgarley ground in Glastonbury in 1962. It probably escaped the headlines because Langford, as primarily a spin bowler, batted well down the order, usually at 9.
