= Richard Johnson (cricketer, born 1974) =

English cricketer for Middlesex and Somerset (born 1974)

Personal information
- Full name: Richard Leonard Johnson
- Born: 29 December 1974 (age 51); Chertsey, Surrey, England
- Nickname: Jono, Lenny, The Greek
- Height: 6 ft 2 in (1.88 m)
- Batting: Right-handed
- Bowling: Right-arm fast-medium
- Role: Bowler

International information
- National side: England
- Test debut (cap 615): 5 June 2003 v Zimbabwe
- Last Test: 2 December 2003 v Sri Lanka
- ODI debut (cap 177): 26 June 2003 v Zimbabwe
- Last ODI: 18 November 2003 v Sri Lanka

Domestic team information
- Years: Team
- 1991–2000: Middlesex
- 2001–2006: Somerset
- 2007: Middlesex

Career statistics
Competition	Test	ODI	FC	LA
Matches	3	10	166	194
Runs scored	59	16	3,545	1,108
Batting average	14.75	5.33	17.81	11.42
100s/50s	0/0	0/0	2/8	0/1
Top score	26	10	118	53
Balls bowled	547	402	27,844	8,607
Wickets	16	11	528	213
Bowling average	17.18	21.72	28.58	32.84
5 wickets in innings	2	0	20	1
10 wickets in match	0	0	3	0
Best bowling	6/33	3/22	10/45	5/50
Catches/stumpings	0/–	0/–	63/–	23/–
- Source: ESPNcricinfo, 17 June 2025

Richard Leonard Johnson (born 29 December 1974) is a former international English cricketer who coached Middlesex County Cricket Club from 2022 to 2025.

== Domestic career ==
A right-arm fast-medium pace swing bowler and useful late-order batsman (he scored two first-class centuries), Johnson made his first-class debut as a teenager in the 1992 County Championship as an opening bowler for Middlesex.

Johnson made headlines in 1994 when he took all ten Derbyshire wickets in their second-innings, returning figures of 10/45. These remain the best innings figures taken in the English County Championship since 1945.

He joined Somerset in 2001, helping the county to win the Cheltenham & Gloucester Trophy in that season. He rejoined Middlesex in 2007.

In a short international career, Johnson played three Tests and ten One Day Internationals (ODIs) for England in 2003, his only year of international cricket.

Johnson announced his retirement from first-class cricket in October 2007, aged 32 before launching a coaching career.

Following his retirement, he gained experience as a bowling coach for both Middlesex and Surrey before his appointment by Middlesex as head coach in January 2022 following the departure of Stuart Law.

== International career ==
=== International recognition ===
Johnson's first taste of international cricket came during the 1992–93 Coca-Cola International Youth Cricket Challenge in South Africa, where he represented England Under-18s, alongside fellow future Test cricketers Marcus Trescothick and Vikram Solanki. The following winter, he toured Sri Lanka with England Under-19s, playing one youth Test and three youth One Day Internationals. He claimed three wickets in each innings of his Test appearance, including that of Mahela Jayawardene, and followed this up with four wickets in the ODI series, finishing the tournament with a bowling average of 14.16 from his Test and 16.50 from the ODI series.

After his ten-wicket haul against Derbyshire, Johnson was named as part of the England A squad to tour India and Bangladesh in the winter of 1994–95.

He was called into the England tour of India in 2001-2 as a late replacement for county colleague Andy Caddick. He did not play in any of the international matches on the tour, although he appeared in one tour match, taking four wickets.

Johnson's Test career began in impressive fashion, as he claimed six wickets in the first-innings of his debut against Zimbabwe in June 2003. Although he remained wicket-less in the second-innings, Johnson received the man of the match award. His figures were the sixth best by an Englishman on Test debut. His One Day International debut came later in the same month as part of the 2003 NatWest Series against Zimbabwe and South Africa. Opening the bowling alongside Darren Gough, he claimed three wickets as Zimbabwe won with two overs to spare. He went wicket-less in two matches against South Africa before claiming another two Zimbabwean wickets in the following match. Following the return of James Anderson, Johnson was no longer opening the bowling, instead being used as first-change bowler. A five-man pace attack bowled Zimbabwe out for just 92, and despite four wickets from Heath Streak, England won the match in just 17.5 overs. He claimed his first non-Zimbabwean wicket in the penultimate match of the competition, having Jacques Kallis caught, following it up two overs later with the wicket of Andrew Hall. Another wicket in the final meant that Johnson finished the tournament with eight wickets for a respectable bowling average of 22.12. A knee injury prevented Johnson from playing in the following Test series against South Africa.

Despite his performance on debut, Johnson was not picked as part of the England Test squad to tour Bangladesh and Sri Lanka. However, when Anderson was ruled out with a knee injury, Johnson cancelled his honeymoon and an injury to Steve Harmison in the first Test saw him selected for the second. He responded by becoming the first English bowler since Nick Cook in 1983 to take five-wicket hauls in his first two Tests. He finished with match figures of 9/93, and was once again rewarded by being named man of the match. In the subsequent ODIs, Johnson claimed three wickets in the second match after remaining wicket-less in the first. Johnson's third, and final, Test appearance came in the first Test against Sri Lanka in December 2003. He claimed a solitary wicket, that of Kumar Sangakkara. England opted to replace Hoggard and Johnson with a sixth batsman and James Kirtley for the second Test, with both bowlers receiving criticism for lacking the variety needed on a flat track at Galle.

== Coaching career ==
Johnson worked as the bowling coach for Middlesex from 2011 to 2018. When Middlesex's head coach was sacked, Johnson took over as interim head coach for the remainder of the 2018 season, but was not appointed as full-time head coach at the end of the season, being beaten to the role by Stuart Law. He then moved to Surrey as a bowling coach, before returning to Middlesex as their first team coach between 2022 and 2025.
