= Household Names =

American alternative rock band

- Origin: Austin, Texas
- Genres: Alternative rock Indie rock
- Years active: 2000–present
- Members: Jason Garcia; Chris Peters; Eric Roberts; Joey Spivey
- Past members: CJ Barker

Household Names was a 4-piece American alternative rock band based in Austin, Texas, active from 2000 to 2010.

== History ==
=== The Trouble With Being Nice (2000) ===
Household Names formed in Austin, Texas in 2000 when songwriter/guitarist Jason Garcia released the debut LP The Trouble With Being Nice, co-produced with Lars Goransson (Blondie, The Cardigans), playing most of the instruments himself. The album received positive reviews. The album played on the occasional college radio station(#67 on CMJ Top 200). The track "Bright Spot" was available for download on MTV.com. Additionally, "Secrecy" reached #1 on what was at the time a contest site for unsigned bands called Garageband.com gaining mild internet exposure and a review from producer Steve Lillywhite.

In August 2002 the album was selected to be included on computer company Hewlett-Packard's Experience Music Project mobile tour.

=== Picture In My Head (2006) ===
The live band had a rotating cast of Austin musicians until 2003, when Chris Peters (bass) and CJ Barker (drums) solidified Household Names into a trio. With Lars Goransson producing, the band released their second full-length album, Picture In My Head on May 6, 2006 to continued positive reviews On March 12, 2007, Household Names made their national debut on primetime television when their track "Only One" was used in an episode of ABC's "What About Brian?".

=== Stories, No Names (2010) ===
CJ Barker left the band in 2007 and was replaced by Joey Spivey; the band also added Eric Roberts on guitar. In 2008 this lineup began recording material for their third album, titled "Stories, No Names", which was released on January 1, 2010.
